= Bridge Creek (John Day River tributary) =

River in Oregon, United States of America

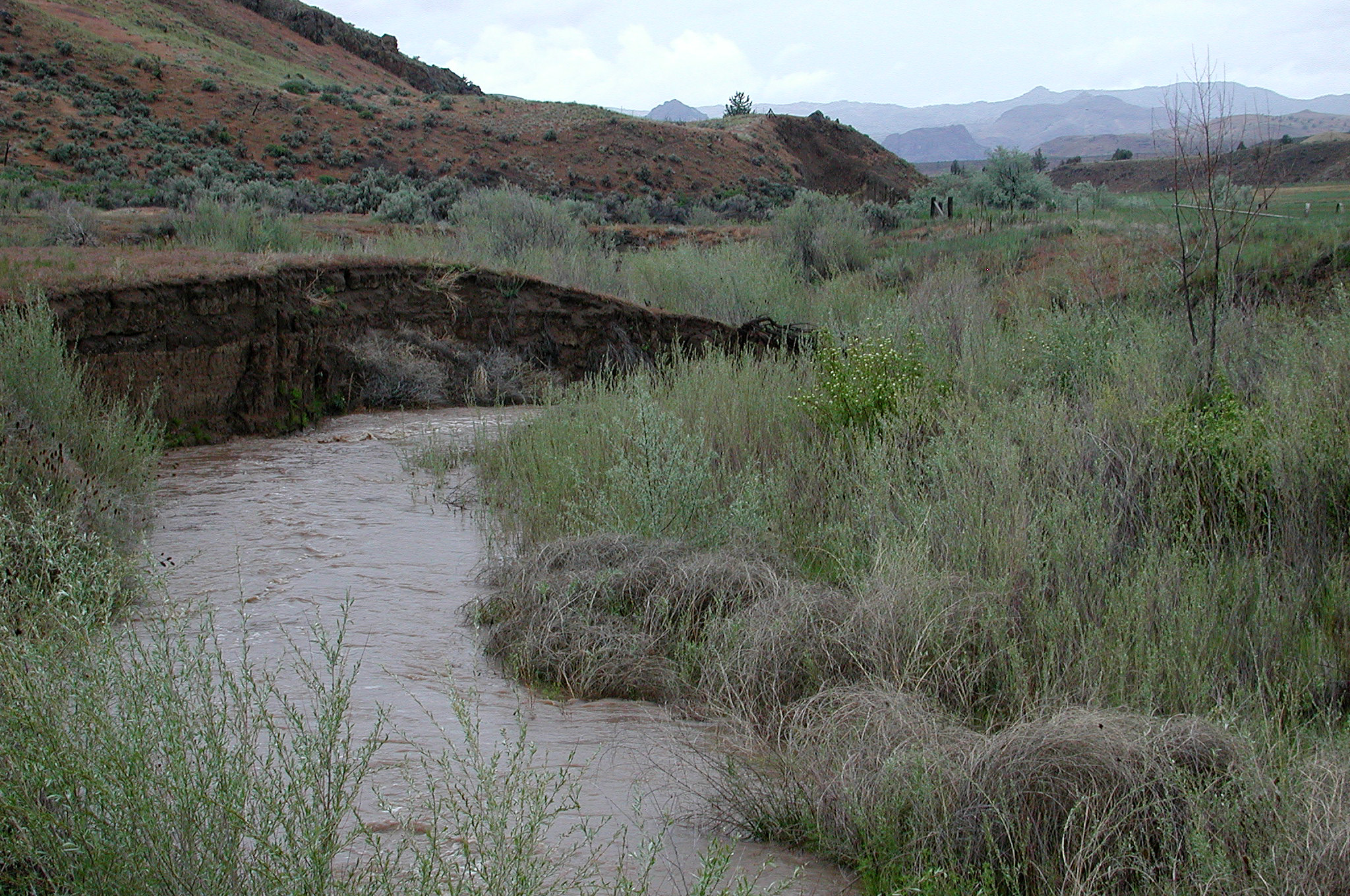
- Bridge Creek in the Painted Hills

- Location of the mouth of Bridge Creek in Oregon
- Etymology: A small bridge made of juniper logs that mining prospectors built over bridge creek in about 1862.

Location
- Country: United States
- State: Oregon
- County: Wheeler

Physical characteristics
- Source: Ochoco Mountains
  - location: Mount Pisgah, Wheeler County, Oregon
  - coordinates: 44°28′00″N 120°14′27″W
  - elevation: 6,333 ft (1,930 m)
- Mouth: John Day River
  - location: Near Coyote Canyon, Wheeler County, Oregon
  - coordinates: 44°44′10″N 120°18′30″W
  - elevation: 1,483 ft (452 m)
- Length: 28 mi (45 km)
- Basin size: 267 sq mi (690 km^{2})
- Discharge
  - location: Coyote Canyon, 0.75 miles (1.21 km) from mouth
  - average: 48 cu ft/s (1.4 m^{3}/s)
  - minimum: 0.15 cu ft/s (0.0042 m^{3}/s)
  - maximum: 221 cu ft/s (6.3 m^{3}/s)

Bridge Creek is a 28-mile (45 km) tributary of the John Day River in the U.S. state of Oregon. Part of the drainage basin of the Columbia River, its watershed covers 267 square miles (690 km^{2}) in Wheeler County.

From its headwaters in the Ochoco Mountains in central Oregon, the creek flows generally northeast for about 13 miles (21 km) from Mount Pisgah in the Bridge Creek Wilderness to the small city of Mitchell on U.S. Route 26. From Mitchell, it flows generally northwest for about 15 miles (24 km), passing through the Painted Hills unit of the John Day Fossil Beds National Monument before meeting the John Day River.

Bridge Creek is subject to occasional flash floods, which have affected Mitchell as well as rural areas nearby. Surging water along the creek, which flows parallel to Main Street in Mitchell, caused great damage in 1884 and 1904. A third flood occurred on July 13, 1956, shortly after an intense thunderstorm in the Ochoco Mountains. The creek is usually less than 12 inches (30 cm) deep in Mitchell during July. Minutes after the thunderstorm, a sudden surge of water destroyed or heavily damaged 20 buildings in the city and several bridges over Bridge Creek. An observer from the United States Geological Survey estimated that about 4 inches (100 mm) of rain had fallen in about 50 minutes at the storm's center. Total damage from the flood, which also caused extensive damage to crops and roads, was $709,000.

== See also ==
- List of rivers of Oregon
