= John Day Fossil Beds National Monument =

National monument in Oregon, United States

- IUCN category V (protected landscape/seascape)
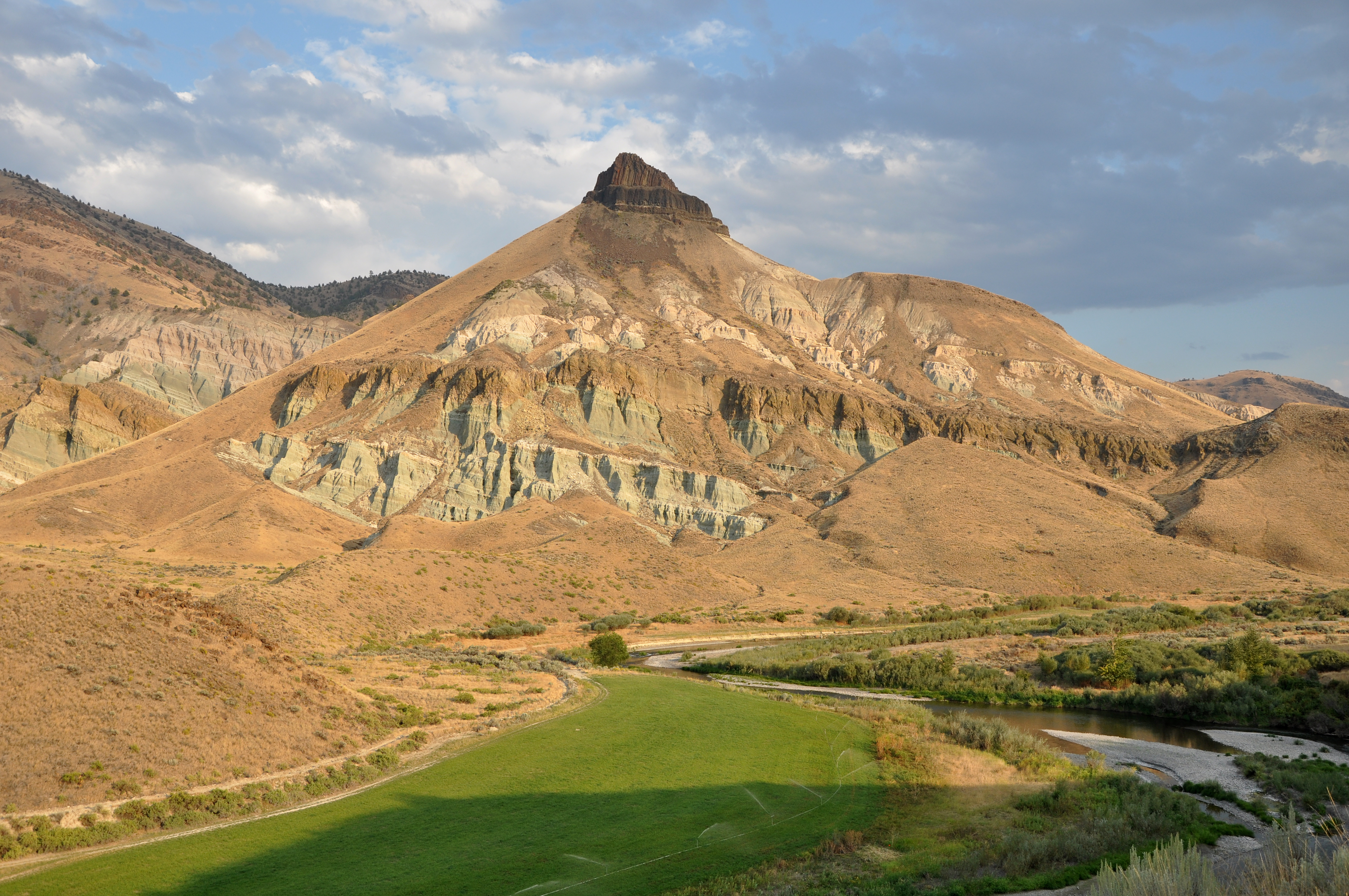
- Sheep Rock near sunset

- Location of the units of the John Day Fossil Beds National Monument in Oregon: Sheep Rock; Painted Hills; Clarno. Inset: Oregon in the United States
- Interactive map of John Day Fossil Beds National Monument
- Location: Oregon, United States
- Coordinates: 44°33′21″N 119°38′43″W
- Area: 14,062 acres (56.91 km^{2})
- Elevation: 2,244 ft (684 m)
- Established: October 8, 1975
- Named for: the John Day River, which was named for early 19th-century fur trader John Day
- Visitors: 88,571 in 2020
- Governing body: National Park Service
- Website: nps.gov/joda

U.S. National Natural Landmark
- Designated: 1966

John Day Fossil Beds National Monument is a U.S. national monument in Wheeler and Grant counties in east-central Oregon. Located within the John Day River basin and managed by the National Park Service, the park is known for its well-preserved layers of fossil plants and mammals that lived in the region between the late Eocene, about 45 million years ago, and the late Miocene, about 5 million years ago. The monument consists of three geographically separate units: Sheep Rock, Painted Hills, and Clarno.

The units cover a total of 13,944 acres (5,643 ha) of semi-desert shrublands, riparian zones, and colorful badlands. About 210,000 people visited the park in 2016 to engage in outdoor recreation or to visit the Thomas Condon Paleontology Center or the James Cant Ranch Historic District.

Before the arrival of Euro-Americans in the 19th century, the John Day basin was frequented by Sahaptin people who hunted, fished, and gathered roots and berries in the region. After road-building made the valley more accessible, settlers established farms, ranches, and a few small towns along the river and its tributaries. Paleontologists have been unearthing and studying the fossils in the region since 1864, when Thomas Condon, a missionary and amateur geologist, recognized their importance and made them known globally. Parts of the basin became a National Monument in 1975.

Averaging about 2,200 feet (670 m) in elevation, the monument has a dry climate with temperatures that vary from summer highs of about 90 °F (32 °C) to winter lows below freezing. The monument has more than 80 soil types that support a wide variety of flora, ranging from willow trees near the river to grasses on alluvial fans to cactus among rocks at higher elevations. Fauna include more than 50 species of resident and migratory birds. Large mammals like elk and smaller animals such as raccoons, coyotes, and voles frequent these units, which are also populated by a wide variety of reptiles, fish, butterflies, and other creatures adapted to particular niches of a mountainous semi-desert terrain.

== Geography ==
The John Day Fossil Beds National Monument consists of three widely separated units—Sheep Rock, Painted Hills, and Clarno—in the John Day River basin of east-central Oregon. Located in rugged terrain in the counties of Wheeler and Grant, the park units are characterized by hills, deep ravines, and eroded fossil-bearing rock formations. To the west lies the Cascade Range, to the south the Ochoco Mountains, and to the east the Blue Mountains. Elevations within the 13,944-acre (5,643 ha) park range from 2,000 to 4,500 feet (610 to 1,370 m).

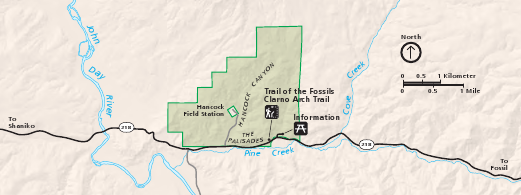
Clarno Unit map

The Clarno Unit, the westernmost of the three units, consists of 1,969 acres (797 ha) located 18 miles (29 km) west of Fossil along Oregon Route 218. The Painted Hills Unit, which lies about halfway between the other two, covers 3,132 acres (1,267 ha). It is situated about 9 miles (14 km) northwest of Mitchell along Burnt Ranch Road, which intersects U.S. Route 26 west of Mitchell. These two units are entirely within Wheeler County. The remaining 8,843 acres (3,579 ha) (Note: Derived by subtracting the sizes of the Clarno and Painted Hills units from the total area of the park.) of the park, the Sheep Rock Unit, are located along Oregon Route 19 and the John Day River upstream of the unincorporated community of Kimberly. This unit is mostly in Grant County; a small part extends into Wheeler County. The Sheep Rock Unit is further subdivided into the Mascall Formation Overlook, Picture Gorge, the James Cant Ranch Historic District, Cathedral Rock, Blue Basin, and the Foree Area. Some of these are separated from one another by farms, ranches, and other parcels of land that are not part of the park.

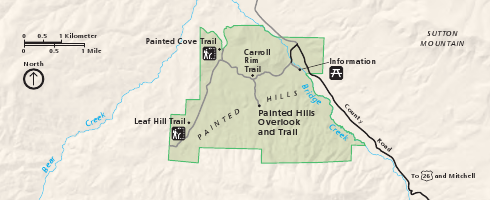
Painted Hills Unit map

The park headquarters and main visitor center, both in the Sheep Rock Unit, are 122 miles (196 km) northeast of Bend and 240 miles (390 km) southeast of Portland by highway. The shortest highway distances from unit to unit within the park are Sheep Rock to Painted Hills, 45 miles (72 km); Painted Hills to Clarno, 75 miles (121 km), and Clarno to Sheep Rock, 81 miles (130 km).

The John Day River, a tributary of the Columbia River, flows generally west from the Strawberry Mountains before reaching the national monument. It turns sharply north between the Mascall Formation Overlook and Kimberly, where the North Fork John Day River joins the main stem. Downstream of Kimberly, the river flows generally west to downstream of the unincorporated community of Twickenham, and generally north thereafter. Rock Creek enters the river at the north end of Picture Gorge. Bridge Creek passes through Mitchell, then north along the eastern edge of the Painted Hills Unit to meet the John Day downstream of Twickenham. Intermittent streams in the Clarno Unit empty into Pine Creek, which flows just beyond the south edge of the unit and enters the John Day upstream of the unincorporated community of Clarno.

== History ==
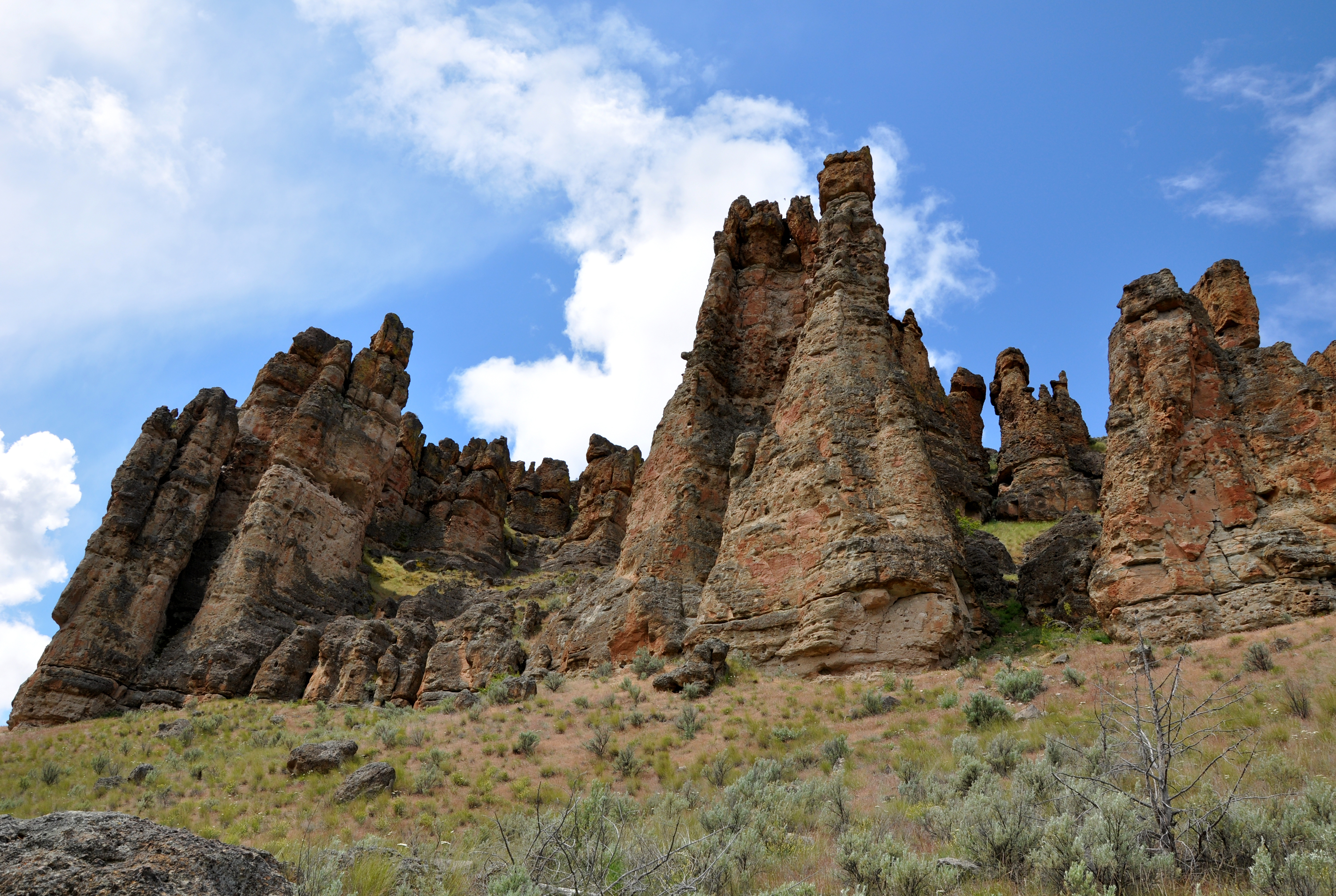
Palisades at the Clarno Unit of the monument

Early inhabitants of north-central Oregon included Sahaptin-speaking people of the Umatilla, Wasco, and Warm Springs tribes as well as the Northern Paiutes, speakers of a Uto-Aztecan (Shoshonean) language. All were hunter-gatherers competing for resources such as elk, huckleberries, and salmon. Researchers have identified 36 sites of related archeological interest, including rock shelters and cairns, in or adjacent to the John Day Fossil Beds National Monument. Most significant among the prehistoric sites are the Picture Gorge pictographs, consisting of six panels of rock art in the canyon at the south end of the Sheep Rock Unit. The art is of undetermined origin and age but is "centuries old".

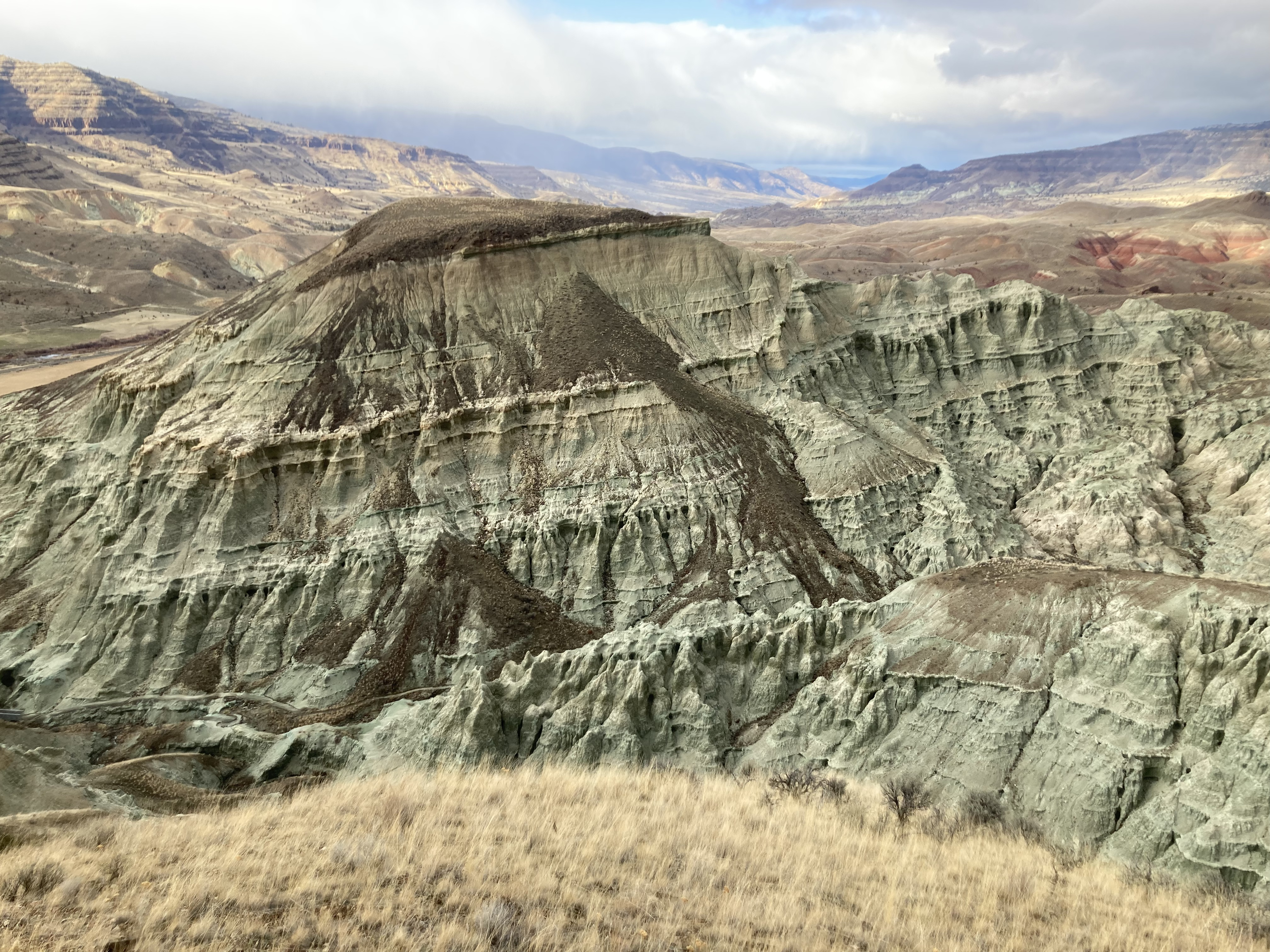
Blue Basin

The John Day basin remained largely unexplored by non-natives until the mid-19th century. Lewis and Clark noted but did not explore the John Day River while traveling along the Columbia River in 1805. John Day, for whom the river is named, apparently visited only its confluence with the Columbia in 1812. In 1829, Peter Skene Ogden, working for the Hudson's Bay Company (HBC), led a company of explorers and fur trappers along the river through what would later become the Sheep Rock Unit. John Work, also of the HBC, visited this part of the river in 1831.

In the 1840s, thousands of settlers, attracted in part by the lure of free land, began emigrating west over the Oregon Trail. Leaving drought, worn-out farms, and economic problems behind, they emigrated from states like Missouri, Illinois, and Iowa in the Midwest to Oregon, especially the Willamette Valley in the western part of the state. After passage of the Homestead Act of 1862 and the discovery of gold in the upper John Day basin, a fraction of these newcomers abandoned the Willamette Valley in favor of eastern Oregon. Some established villages and engaged in subsistence farming and ranching near streams. Settlement was made more practical by a supply route from The Dalles on the Columbia River to gold mines at Canyon City in the upper John Day valley. By the late 1860s, the route became formalized as The Dalles Military Road, which passed along Bridge Creek and south of Sheep Rock. Clashes between natives and non-natives and the desire of the U.S. Government to populate the region with Euro-Americans led to the gradual removal of native residents to reservations, including three in north-central Oregon: Warm Springs, Burns Paiute, and Umatilla.

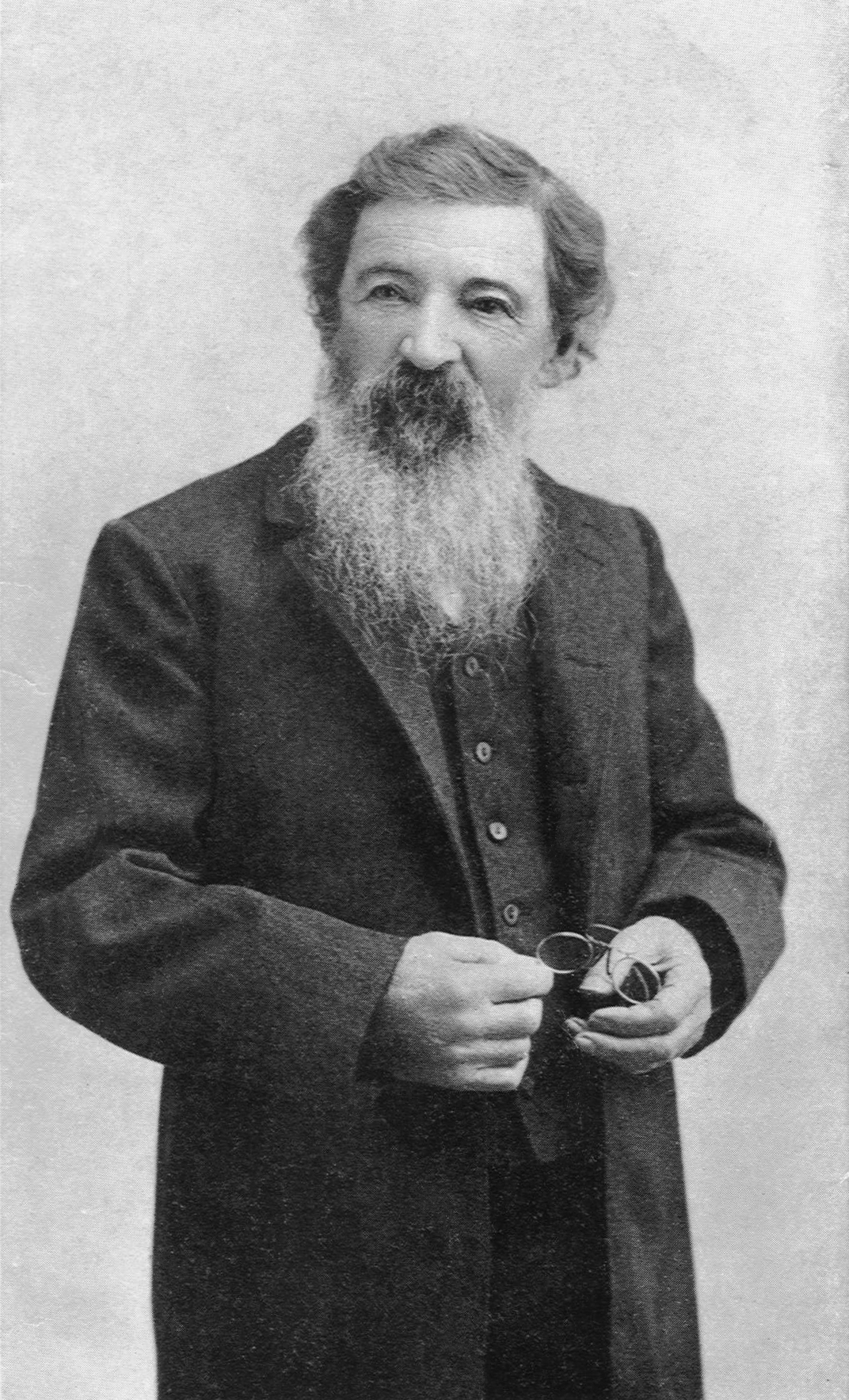
Thomas Condon

In 1864, a company of soldiers sent to protect mining camps from raids by Northern Paiutes discovered fossils in the Crooked River region, south of the John Day basin. One of their leaders, Captain John M. Drake, collected some of these fossils for Thomas Condon, a missionary pastor and amateur geologist who lived in The Dalles. Recognizing the scientific importance of the fossils, Condon accompanied soldiers traveling through the region. He discovered rich fossil beds along Bridge Creek and near Sheep Rock in 1865. Condon's trips to the area and his public lectures and reports about his finds led to wide interest in the fossil beds among scientists such as Edward Drinker Cope of the Academy of Natural Sciences. One of them, paleontologist Othniel C. Marsh of Yale, accompanied Condon on a trip to the region in 1871. (Note: Marsh is credited with giving the fossil beds their name, John Day Fossil Beds, in 1875.) Condon's work led to his appointment in 1872 as Oregon's first state geologist and to international fame for the fossil beds. Specimens from the beds were sent to the Smithsonian Institution and other museums worldwide, and by 1900 more than 100 articles and books had been published about the John Day Fossil Beds. During the first half of the 20th century, scientists such as John C. Merriam, Ralph Chaney, Frank H. Knowlton, and Alonzo W. Hancock continued work in the fossil beds, including those discovered near Clarno in about 1890.

Remote and arid, the John Day basin near the fossil beds was slow to attract homesteaders. The first settler in what became the Sheep Rock Unit is thought to have been Frank Butler, who built a cabin along the river in 1877. In 1881, Eli Casey Officer began grazing sheep on a homestead claim in same general area. His son Floyd later lived there with his family and sometimes accompanied Condon on his fossil hunts. In 1910, James and Elizabeth Cant bought 700 acres (280 ha) from the Officer family. and converted it to a sheep ranch, which was eventually expanded to a sheep-and-cattle ranch of about 6,000 acres (2,400 ha).

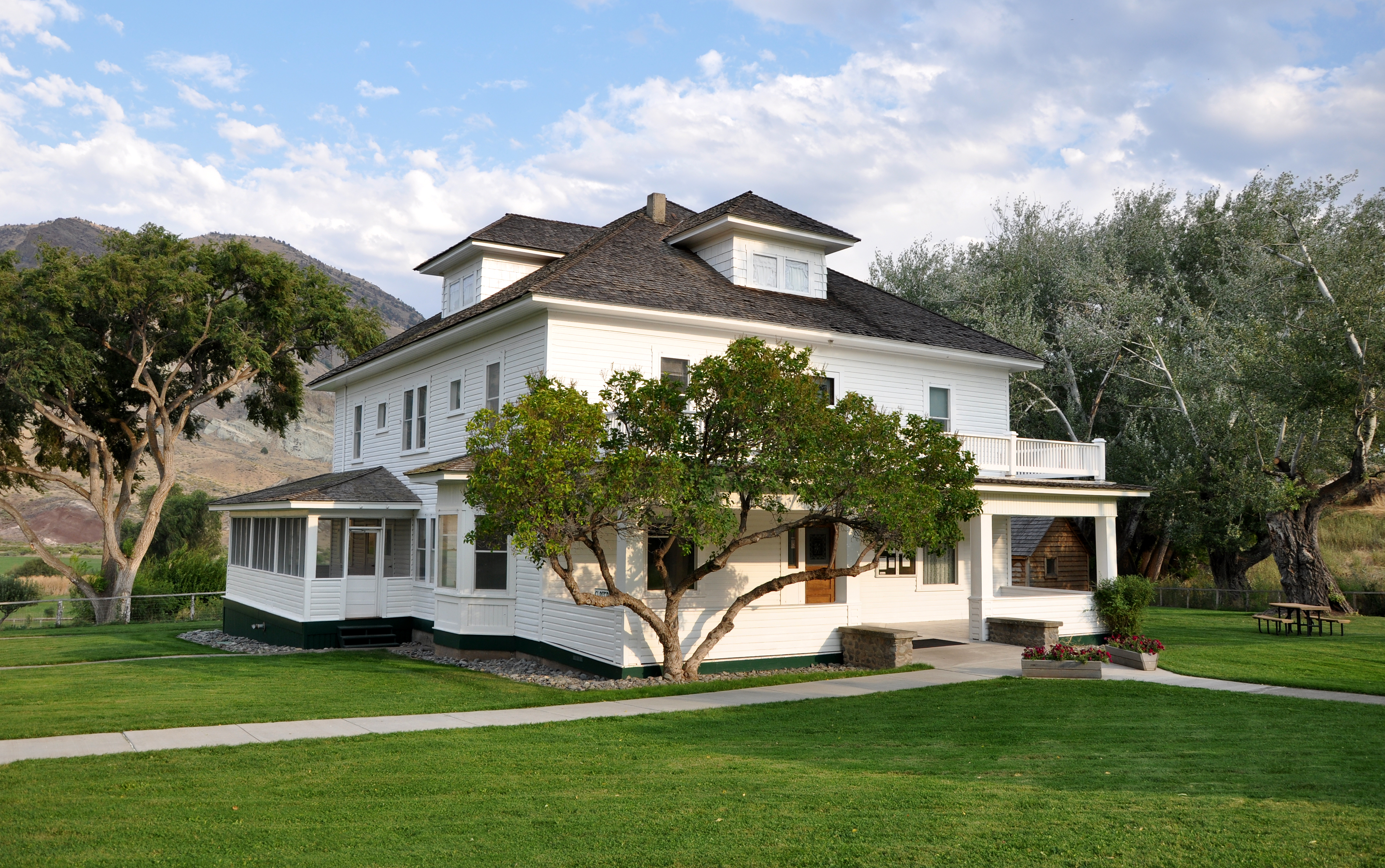
The Cant Ranch House in 2011

Merriam, a University of California paleontologist who had led expeditions to the region in 1899 and 1900, encouraged the State of Oregon to protect the area. (Note: In the early 20th century, Merriam began describing the region's paleontology systematically. In the 1920s, he formed the John Day Associates, an organization of regional scientists who studied various attributes of the John Day Valley. He provided "the first really comprehensive understanding of the geology, described many important new species, compiled authoritative faunal lists for the first time, and published exceptional manuscripts on the area".) In the early 1930s the state began to buy land for state parks at Picture Gorge, the Painted Hills, and Clarno that later became part of the national monument. In 1951 the Oregon Museum of Science and Industry established Camp Hancock, a field school for young students of geology, paleontology, and other sciences, on public lands surrounded by what would later become the Clarno Unit. In 1974 Congress authorized the National Park Service to establish the national monument, and President Gerald R. Ford signed the authorization. After the State of Oregon had completed the land transfer of the three state parks to the federal government, the monument was officially established on October 8, 1975.

The Cant Ranch House and associated land and outbuildings were listed on the National Register of Historic Places as the 200-acre (81 ha) James Cant Ranch Historic District in 1984. After the monument opened in 1975, the ranch house served as headquarters for all three units. In 2005, the lower floor of the ranch house was opened to the public; it features exhibits about the cultural history of the region. The Thomas Condon Paleontology Center, a $7.5 million museum and visitor center at the Sheep Rock Unit, also opened in 2005. Among the center's offerings are displays of fossils, murals depicting life in the basin during eight geologic times ranging from about 45 million to about 5 million years ago, and views of the paleontology laboratory.

In March 2011, the Park Service installed two webcams at the Sheep Rock Unit. Both transmit continuous real-time images; one shows the paleontology lab at the Condon Center and the other depicts Sheep Rock and nearby features. In June 2011, work was finished on a new ranger residence in the Painted Hills Unit that makes the unit almost carbon-neutral. Solar panels generate enough electricity to power the house as well as the ranger's electric vehicle, on loan from its manufacturer for a year. The project is part of ongoing efforts to make the whole park carbon-neutral.

== Geology and paleontology ==
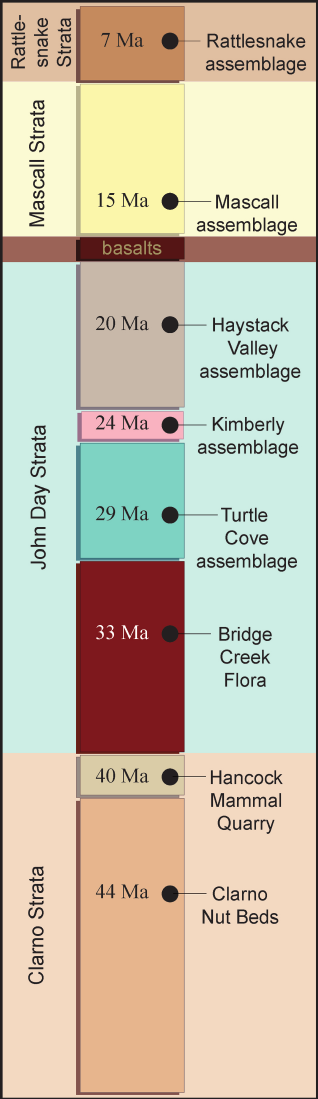
Timeline showing the major rock strata and fossil groups (assemblages) in the park in the order they were deposited, from bottom (oldest) to top (youngest) as they appear in nature. "Ma" stands for megaannus, "million years ago".

The John Day Fossil Beds National Monument lies within the Blue Mountains physiographic province, which originated during the late Jurassic and early Cretaceous, about 118 to 93 million years ago. Northeastern Oregon was assembled in large blocks (exotic terranes) of Permian, Triassic, and Jurassic rock shifted by tectonic forces and accreted to what was then the western edge of the North American continent, near the Idaho border. By the beginning of the Cenozoic era, 66 million years ago, the Blue Mountains province was uplifting (that is, was being pushed higher by tectonic forces), and the Pacific Ocean shoreline, formerly near Idaho, had shifted to the west. (Note: Cretaceous rocks, which underlie the Cenozoic, are exposed in the Sheep Rock Unit of the park at Goose Rock along Highway 19 and the John Day River. Goose Rock is what remains of the bed of rounded cobbles and gravels of a Goose Rock River that flowed west through the region to an ancient ocean shore near Mitchell. West of Mitchell, beyond the park boundaries, marine sediments known as the Hudspeth Formation have yielded Cretaceous fossils including ammonites; fish scales; and bits of the avian pterosaur and the marine ichthyosaur and mosasaur.)

Volcanic eruptions about 44 million years ago during the Eocene deposited lavas accompanied by debris flows (lahars) atop the older rocks in the western part of the province. Containing fragments of shale, siltstone, conglomerates, and breccias, the debris flows entombed plants and animals caught in their paths; the remnants of these ancient flows comprise the rock formations exposed in the Clarno Unit. Preserved in the Clarno Nut Beds are fossils of tropical and subtropical nuts, fruits, roots, branches, and seeds. The Clarno Formation also contains bones, palm leaves longer than 24 inches (61 cm), avocado trees, and other subtropical plants from 50 million years ago, when the climate was warmer and wetter than it is in the 21st century. Large mammals that inhabited this region between 50 and 35 million years ago included browsers such as brontotheres and amynodonts, scavengers like the hyaenodonts, as well as Patriofelis and other predators. Eroded remnants of the Clarno stratovolcanoes, once the size of Mount Hood, are still visible near the monument, for example Black Butte, White Butte, and other buttes near Mitchell.

After the Clarno volcanoes had subsided, they were replaced about 36 million years ago by eruptions from volcanoes to the west, in the general vicinity of what would become the Cascade Range. The John Day volcanoes, as they are called, emitted large volumes of ash and dust, much of which settled in the John Day basin. As with the earlier Clarno debris flows, the rapid deposition of ash preserved the remains of plants and animals living in the region. Because ash and other debris fell during varied climatic and volcanic conditions and accumulated from many further eruptions extending into the early Miocene (about 20 million years ago), the sediment layers in the fossil beds vary in their chemical composition and color. Laid down on top of the Clarno Strata, the younger John Day Strata consist of several distinct groups of layers. The lowermost contains red ash such as that exposed in the Painted Hills Unit. The layer above it is mainly pea-green clay. On top of the pea-green layer are buff-colored layers. Fossils found in the John Day Strata include a wide variety of plants and more than 100 species of mammals, including dogs, cats, oreodonts, saber-toothed tigers, horses, camels, and rodents. The Blue Basin and the Sheep Rock unit contain many of these same fossils, as well as turtles, opossums, and large pigs. More than 60 plant species are fossilized in these strata, such as hydrangea, peas, hawthorn, and mulberry, as well as pines and many deciduous trees. One of the notable plant fossils is the Metasequoia (dawn redwood), a genus thought to have gone extinct worldwide until it was discovered alive in China in the early 20th century.

After another period of erosion, a series of lava eruptions from fissures across northeastern Oregon, southeastern Washington, and western Idaho inundated much of the Blue Mountain province with liquid basalt. Extruded in the middle Miocene between 17 and 12 million years ago, more than 40 separate flows contributing to the Columbia River Basalt Group have been identified, the largest of which involved up to 400 cubic miles (1,700 km^{3}) of lava. The most prominent of these formations within the monument is the Picture Gorge Basalt, which rests above the John Day Strata.

Subsequent ashfall from eruptions in the Cascade Range in the late Miocene contributed to the Mascall Formation, layers of stream-deposited volcanic tuffs laid atop the Picture Gorge Basalt. Preserved in the Mascall are fossils of animals such as horses, camels, rhinoceroses, bears, pronghorn, deer, weasels, raccoons, cats, dogs, and sloths. These fauna thrived in the monument's open woodland and savannah between 15 and 12 million years ago. The fossils of oak, sycamore, maple, ginkgo, and elm trees reflect the area's cool climate during this time period.

The last major eruption occurred in the late Miocene, about 7 million years ago. The resulting stratum, the Rattlesnake Formation, lies on top of the Mascall and contains an ignimbrite. The Rattlesnake stratum has fossils of mastodons, camels, rhinoceroses, the ancestors of dogs, lions, bears, and horses, and others that grazed on the grasslands of the time. Two fossilized teeth found recently in the Rattlesnake stratum near Dayville are the earliest record of beaver, Castor californicus, in North America. The beaver teeth, which are about 7 million years old, have been scheduled for display at the Condon Center.

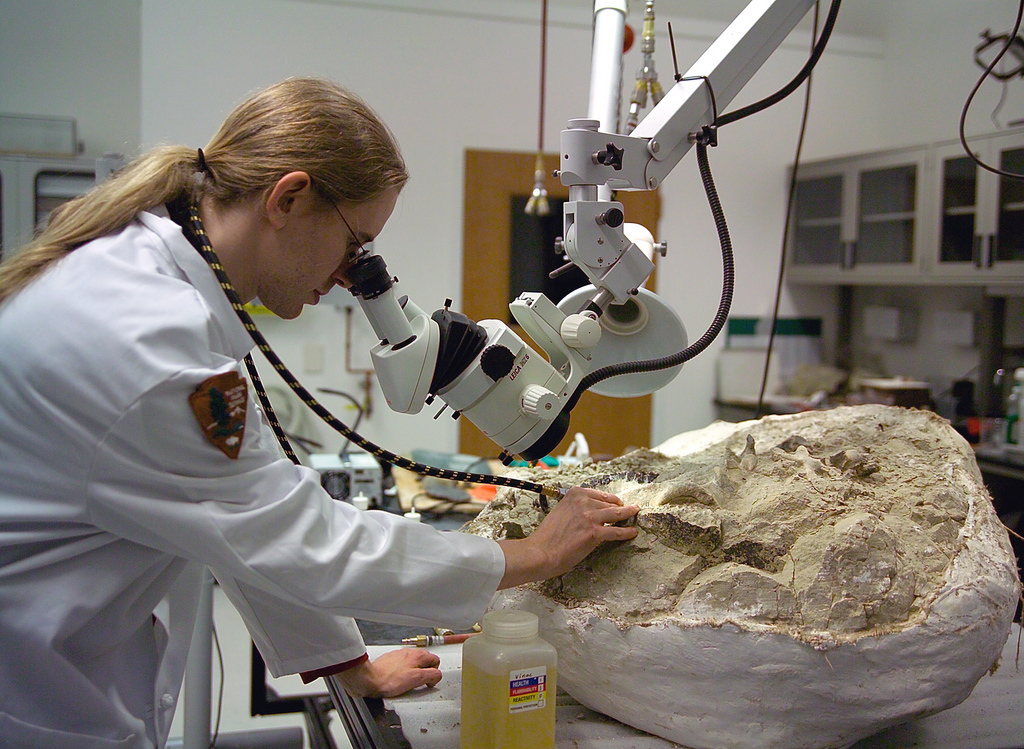
Fossil preparation in the laboratory at the Condon Center

The monument contains extensive deposits of well-preserved fossils from various periods spanning more than 40 million years. Taken as a whole, the fossils present an unusually detailed view of plants and animals since the late Eocene. In addition, analysis of the John Day fossils has contributed to paleoclimatology (the study of Earth's past climates) and the study of evolution. (Note: Fremd, et al., in John Day Basin Paleontology Field Trip Guide and Road Log agree with paleobotanist Ralph Chaney, who wrote that no place in the world reveals more complete sequences of Tertiary land populations than the John Day formations. To this they add: "The significance of the John Day region is due to more than just the presence of large numbers of well-preserved fossils ... The largely volcaniclastic sequences in the basin together span over forty million years, and preserve evidence of profound changes in western North American climate, from what was probably the warmest and wettest interval in the Tertiary through the desertification of most regions east of the present day Cascades.")

Paleontologists at the monument find, describe the location of, and collect fossil-bearing rocks from more than 700 sites. They take them to the paleontology laboratory at the visitor center, where the fossils are stabilized, separated from their rock matrix, and cleaned. The fossil specimens are then catalogued, indexed, stored in climate-controlled cabinets, and made available for research. (Note: The paleontology collection includes more than 50,000 objects stored at the Condon Center. This is the largest collection in the world of "stratigraphically documented fossils from the John Day region". A similar number of specimens from the region are located in collections elsewhere, the four largest of which are in the University of California Museum of Paleontology, the University of Washington Burke Museum, the American Museum of Natural History, and the Yale Peabody Museum. The monument has smaller collections of objects related to geology, biology, and history, and each of the sets of objects is matched by related collections of technical documents, archives, photographs, and databases.) In addition to preparing fossils, the paleontologists coordinate the monument's basic research in paleobotany and other scientific areas and manage the fossil museum in the visitor center.

== Climate ==
Average precipitation, limited by the rain shadow effects of the Cascade Range and the Ochoco Mountains, varies from 9 to 16 inches (230 to 410 mm) a year. In winter, much of the precipitation arrives as snow.

Weather data for the city of Mitchell, near the Painted Hills Unit, show that July and August are the warmest months, with an average high of 86 °F (30 °C) and an average low of 52 °F (11 °C). January is the coldest month, when highs average 42 °F (6 °C) and lows average 24 °F (−4 °C). The highest recorded temperature in Mitchell was 107 °F (42 °C) in 1972, and the lowest was −27 °F (−33 °C) in 1983. May is generally the wettest month, when precipitation averages 1.65 inches (42 mm).

Climate data for Mitchell, Oregon
Month	Jan	Feb	Mar	Apr	May	Jun	Jul	Aug	Sep	Oct	Nov	Dec	Year
Mean daily maximum °F (°C)	42 (6)	47 (8)	54 (12)	60 (16)	69 (21)	77 (25)	86 (30)	86 (30)	77 (25)	65 (18)	49 (9)	42 (6)	63 (17)
Mean daily minimum °F (°C)	24 (−4)	27 (−3)	31 (−1)	34 (1)	40 (4)	47 (8)	52 (11)	52 (11)	44 (7)	36 (2)	30 (−1)	25 (−4)	37 (3)
Average precipitation inches (mm)	0.87 (22)	0.65 (17)	1.00 (25)	1.22 (31)	1.65 (42)	1.13 (29)	0.61 (15)	0.65 (17)	0.67 (17)	0.80 (20)	1.12 (28)	0.99 (25)	11.36 (288)
Source: The Weather Channel

== Biology ==
=== Flora ===
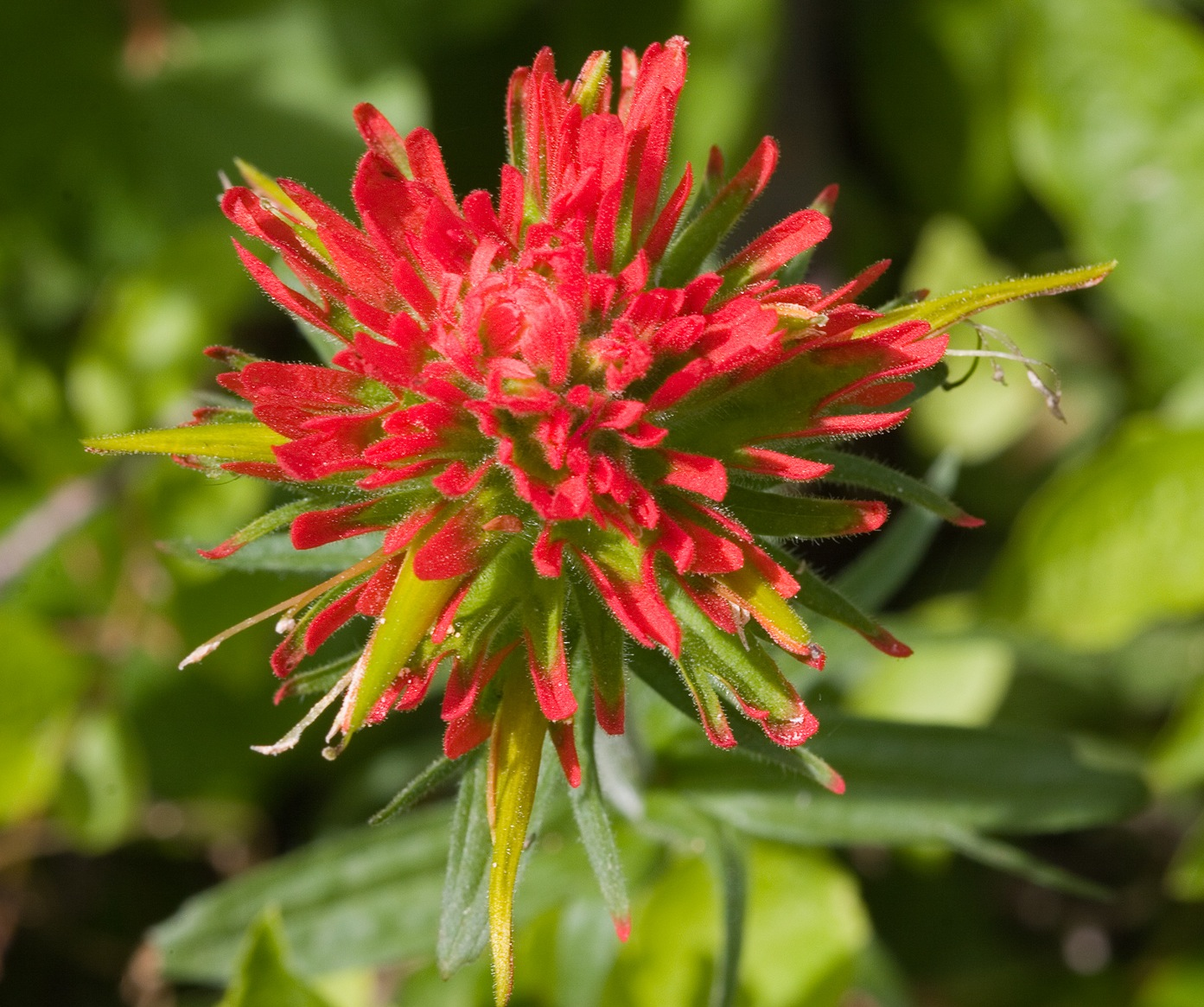
Applegate's Indian paintbrush

More than 80 soil types support a wide variety of flora within the monument. These soils stem from past and present geologic activity as well as ongoing additions of organic matter from life forms on or near the surface. Adapted to particular soil types and surface conditions, these plant communities range from riparian vegetation near the river to greasewood and saltgrass on the alluvial fans to plants such as hedgehog cactus in rocky outcrops at high elevation. Important to many of these communities is a black cryptobiotic crust that resists erosion, stores water, and fixes nitrogen used by the plants. The crust is composed of algae, lichens, mosses, fungi, and bacteria. Other areas of the monument have little or no flora. Volcanic tuffs and claystones that lack essential nutrients support few microorganisms and plants. Likewise, hard rock surfaces and steep slopes from which soils wash or blow away tend to remain bare.

Native grasses thrive in many parts of the monument despite competition from medusahead rye, Dalmatian toadflax, cheatgrass, and other invasive species. Bunchgrasses in the park include basin wildrye, Idaho fescue, Thurber's needlegrass, Indian ricegrass, and bottlebrush squirreltail, among others. Native grasses that form sod in parts of the monument include Sandberg's bluegrass and other bluegrass species. Reed canary grass, if mowed, also forms sod along stream banks.

Limited by their need for water, trees such as willows, alders, and ponderosa pines are found only near the monument's streams or springs. Serviceberry bushes and shrubs like mountain mahogany are found in places where moisture collects near rock slides and ledges. Elsewhere long-rooted rabbitbrush has adapted to survive in dry areas. Other shrubs with adaptive properties include greasewood, sagebrush, shadscale, broom snakeweed, antelope bitterbrush, and purple sage. Western junipers, which have extensive root systems, thrive in the dry climate; in the absence of periodic fires they tend to displace grasses and sagebrush and to create relatively barren landscapes. The Park Service is considering controlled burning to limit the junipers and to create open areas for bunchgrasses that re-sprout from their roots after a fire.

Wildflowers, which bloom mainly in the spring and early summer, include pincushions, golden bee plant, dwarf purple monkey flower, and sagebrush mariposa lily at the Painted Hills Unit. Munro's globemallow, lupines, yellow fritillary, hedgehog cactus, and Applegate's Indian paintbrush are commonly seen at the Clarno and Sheep Rock units.

=== Fauna ===
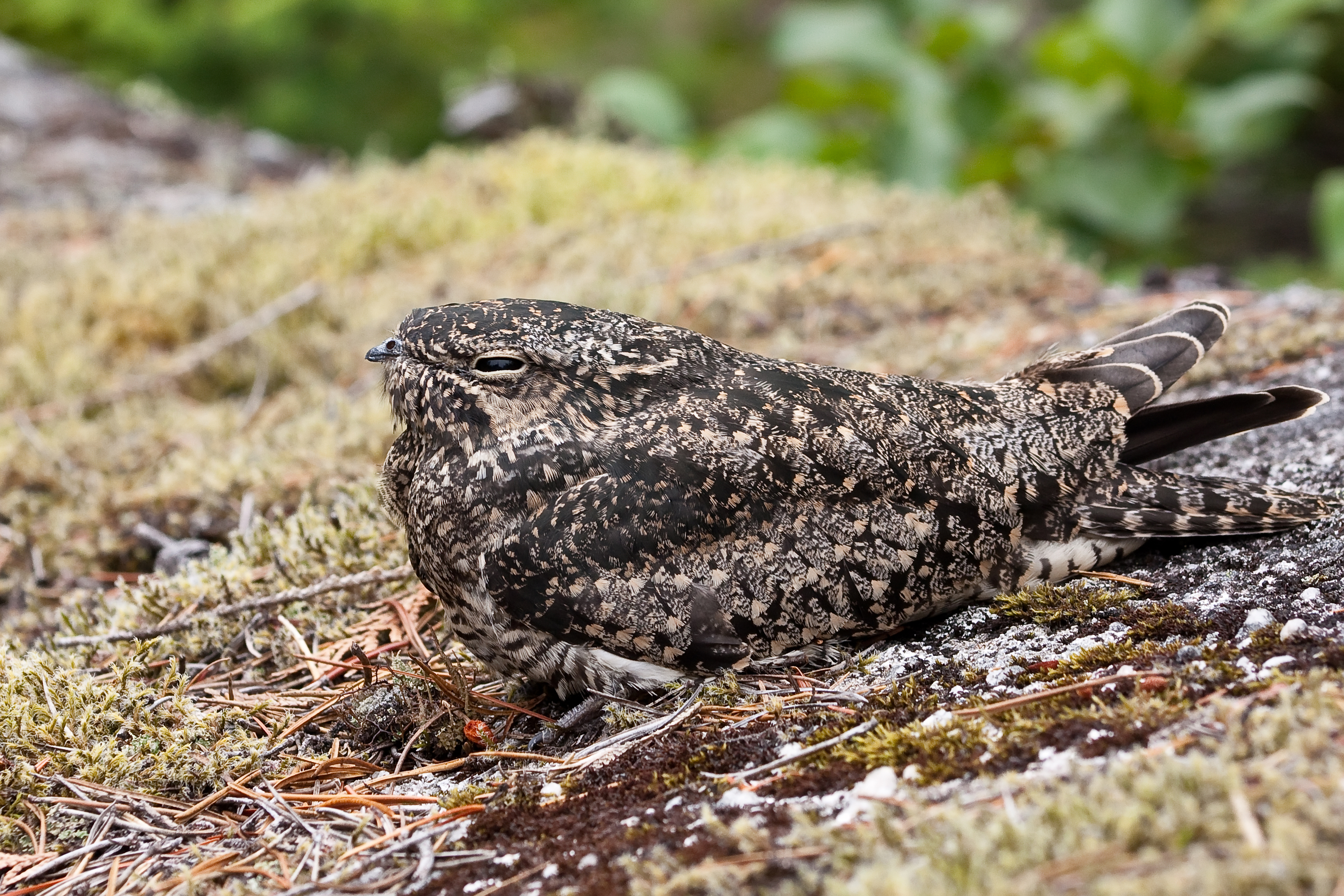
The common nighthawk is one of more than 50 species of birds seen in the monument.

Birds are the animals most often seen in the monument. Included among the more than 50 species observed are red-tailed hawks, American kestrels, great horned owls, common nighthawks, and great blue herons. Geese nest in the park each summer, and flocks of sandhill cranes and swans pass overhead each year on their migratory flights. California quail, chukar partridges, and mourning doves are also common. Others seen near the Cant Ranch and the visitor center include rufous hummingbirds, Say's phoebe, yellow warblers, western meadowlarks, and American goldfinches. Visitors on trails may encounter canyon wrens, mountain bluebirds, mountain chickadees, black-billed magpies, and other birds.

Large animals that frequent the park include elk, deer, cougar, and pronghorn. Beaver, otter, mink, and raccoons are found in or near the river. Coyotes, bats, and badgers are among the park's other mammals. Predators hunt smaller animals such as the rabbits, voles, mice, and shrews found in the park's grasslands and sagebrush-covered hills. Bushy-tailed woodrats inhabit caves and crevices in the monument's rock formations. Bighorn sheep, wiped out in this region in the early 20th century, were reintroduced in the Foree Area of the Sheep Rock Unit in 2010. Many habitats in the monument support populations of snakes and lizards. Southern alligator and western fence lizards are common; others that live here include short-horned and common side-blotched lizards and western skinks. Garter and gopher snakes and western yellow-bellied racers frequent floodplains and canyon bottoms. Rattlesnakes, though venomous, are shy and usually flee before being seen. The springs and seeps in the park contain isolated populations of western toads, American spadefoot toads, Pacific tree frogs, and long-toed salamanders.

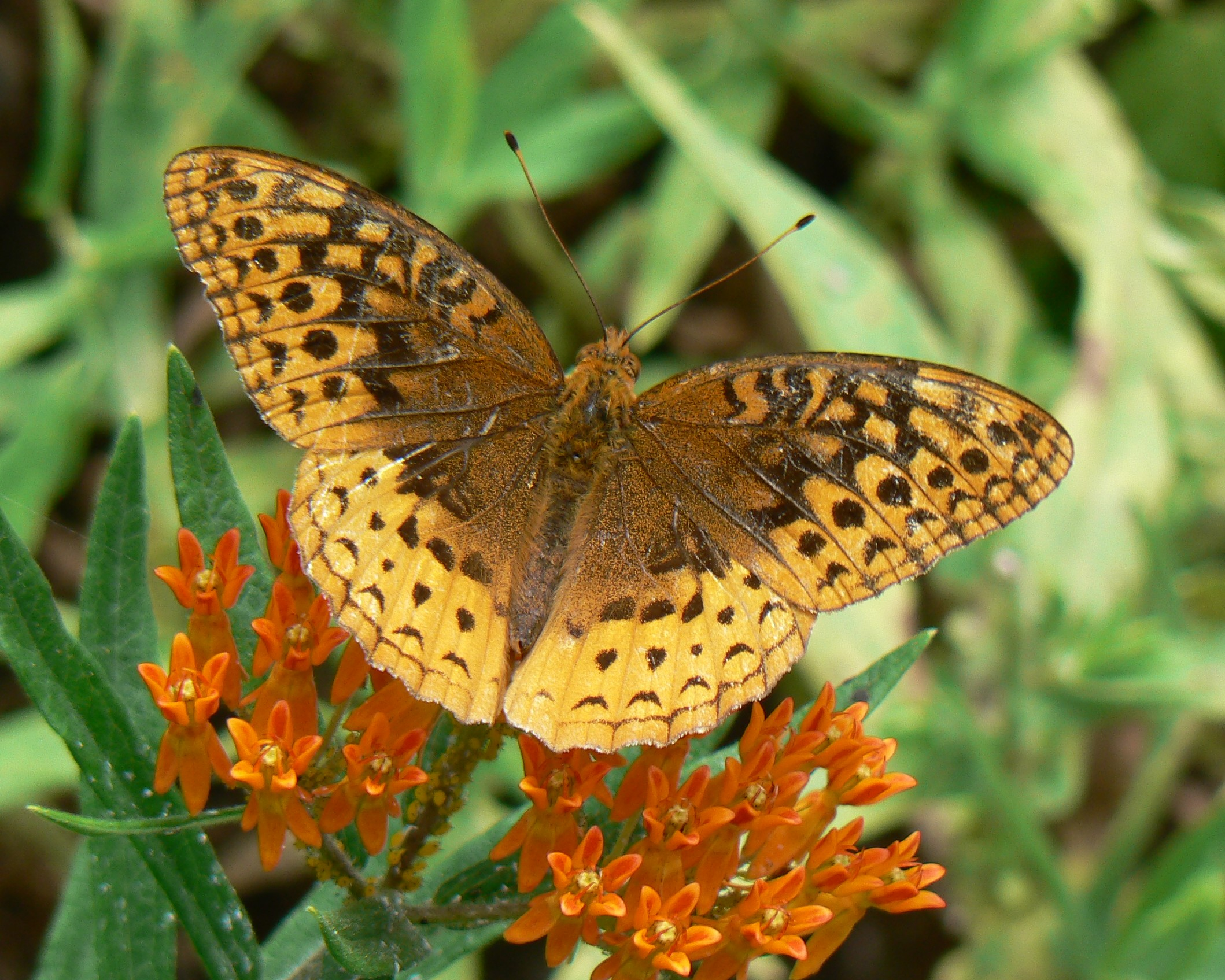
The great spangled fritillary is one of 55 species of butterfly recorded in the park.

A 2003–04 survey of the monument found 55 species of butterflies such as the common sootywing, orange sulphur, great spangled fritillary, and monarch. The monument's other insects have not been completely inventoried.

The John Day River, which passes through the Sheep Rock Unit, is the longest undammed tributary of the Columbia River, although two Columbia River dams below the John Day River mouth impede migratory fish travel to some degree. Chinook salmon and steelhead pass through the monument on their way to and from upstream spawning beds and the Pacific Ocean. Species observed at the Sheep Rock Unit also include those able to tolerate warm summer river temperatures: bridgelip suckers, northern pikeminnow, redside shiners, and smallmouth bass. From October through June, when the water is cooler, Columbia River redband trout and sculpin are among species that move downriver through the park. The Park Service has removed or replaced irrigation diversions along the river or Rock Creek that formerly impeded fish movement, and it is restoring riparian vegetation such as black cottonwood trees that shade the water in summer and provide habitat for aquatic insects.

== Activities ==
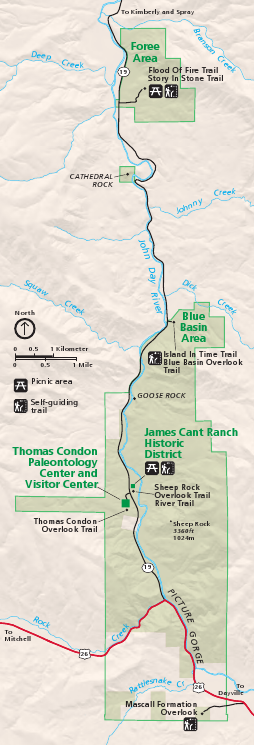
Map of the Sheep Rock Unit

Entrance to the park and its visitor center, museums, and exhibits is free, and trails, overlooks, and picnic sites at all three units are open during daylight hours year-round. No food, lodging, or fuel is available in the park, and camping is not allowed. Hours of operation for the Cant Ranch and its cultural museum vary seasonally. The Thomas Condon Paleontology Center is open Thursday-Monday from 10 a.m. to 4 p.m. except for federal holidays during the winter season from Veterans Day in November through Presidents' Day in February. Its amenities include a fossil museum, theater, education classroom, bookstore, restrooms, and drinking fountains. There is no cell phone or pay telephone service in the monument, but free wifi is available at the visitors center. Water taps at picnic areas are shut down in the colder months.

The Sheep Rock Unit has eight trails ranging in length from 300 feet (91 m) at the Mascall Formation Overlook to 3 miles (4.8 km) at Blue Basin. Four trails of a quarter-mile to 1.5 miles (2.4 km) long cross parts of the Painted Hills Unit. At the Clarno Unit, three separate quarter-mile trails begin at a parking lot along Oregon Route 218, below the face of the Clarno Palisades. Many of the trails have interpretive signs about the history, geology, and fossils of the region, and three trails—Story in Stone at the Sheep Rock Unit, and Painted Cove and Leaf Hill at the Painted Hills Unit—are accessible by wheelchair. Visitors are asked to stay on the trails and off bare rock and hardpan to avoid damage to fossils and fragile soils.

Ranger-led events at the monument have historically included indoor and outdoor talks, showings of an 18-minute orientation film, hikes in Blue Basin, Cant Ranch walking tours, and astronomy programs at the Painted Hills Unit. These events are free and most do not require reservations. Specific times for the activities are available from rangers at the monument. For students and teachers, the Park Service offers programs at the monument as well as fossil kits and other materials for classroom use.

Pets are allowed in developed areas and along hiking trails but must be leashed or otherwise restrained. Horses are not allowed on hiking trails, in picnic areas, or on bare rock exposures in undeveloped areas of the monument. Digging, disturbing, or collecting any of the park's natural resources, including fossils, is prohibited. Fossil theft is an ongoing problem. No mountain biking is allowed on monument land, although the Malheur National Forest east of Dayville has biking trails. Fishing is legal from monument lands along the John Day River for anyone with an Oregon fishing license. Rafting on the John Day River is seasonally popular, although the favored runs begin at or downstream of Service Creek and do not pass through the monument. Risks to monument visitors include extremely hot summer temperatures and icy winter roads, two species of venomous rattlesnakes, two species of venomous spiders, ticks, scorpions, puncturevine, and poison ivy.

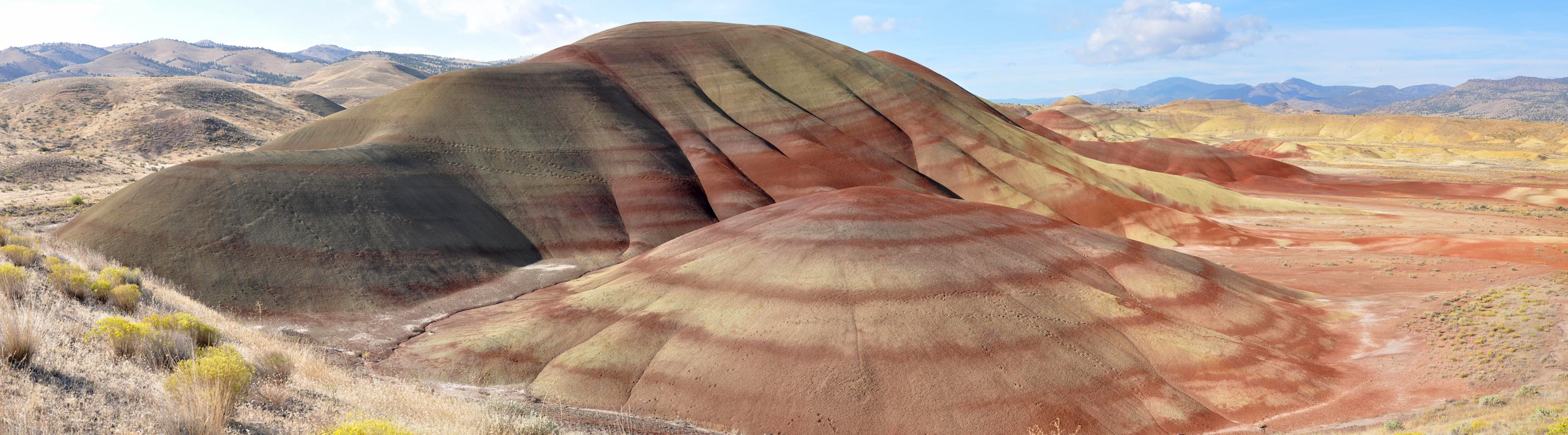
Multicolored strata in the Painted Hills Unit

== See also ==
- List of fossil sites
- List of national monuments of the United States

== Sources ==
- Alt, David D.; Hyndman, Donald W. (1978). Roadside Geology of Oregon (19th ed.). Missoula, Montana: Mountain Press. ISBN 0-87842-063-0. OCLC 3516367.
- Kiver, Eugene P.; Harris, David V. (1999). Geology of U.S. Parklands. New York, New York: John Wiley & Sons. ISBN 978-0-471-33218-3. OCLC 39922059.
- Beckham, Stephen Dow; Lentz, Florence K. (2000). John Day Fossil Beds National Monument: Rocks & Hard Places: Historic Resources Study. Seattle, Washington: National Park Service. OCLC 47958562. Archived from the original on July 5, 2015.
- Bishop, Ellen Morris (2003). In Search of Ancient Oregon: A Geological and Natural History. Portland, Oregon: Timber Press. ISBN 978-0-88192-789-4. OCLC 51614008.
- Bishop, Ellen Morris; Allen, John Eliot (1996). Hiking Oregon's Geology. Seattle, Washington: The Mountaineers. ISBN 0-89886-485-2. OCLC 47008924.
- DeRooy, Carola; McDonald, Greg; Floray, Steve; Meyer, Herbert; Fremd, Ted; Nicholson, Diane L.; Shelton, Sally (2008). "John Day Fossil Beds National Monument Museum Management Plan" (PDF). National Park Service. Archived from the original (PDF) on July 13, 2014.
- Fremd, Theodore; Bestland, Erick A.; Retallack, Gregory J. (1997). John Day Basin Paleontology: Field Trip Guide and Road Log. Seattle: Northwest Interpretive Association. ISBN 0-914019-40-6.
- Mark, Stephen R. (1996). Floating in the Stream of Time: An Administrative History of John Day Fossil Beds National Monument. National Park Service. OCLC 439789407. Archived from the original on July 5, 2015.
- McArthur, Lewis A.; McArthur, Lewis L. (2003) [1928]. Oregon Geographic Names (7th ed.). Portland: Oregon Historical Society Press. ISBN 0-87595-277-1. OCLC 636774573.
- Orr, Elizabeth L.; Orr, William N. (1999). Geology of Oregon (5th ed.). Dubuque, Iowa: Kendall/Hunt Publishing Company. ISBN 0-7872-6608-6. OCLC 42944922.
