= Kimberly, Oregon =

Unincorporated community in central Oregon

Coordinates: 44°45′34″N 119°38′36″W

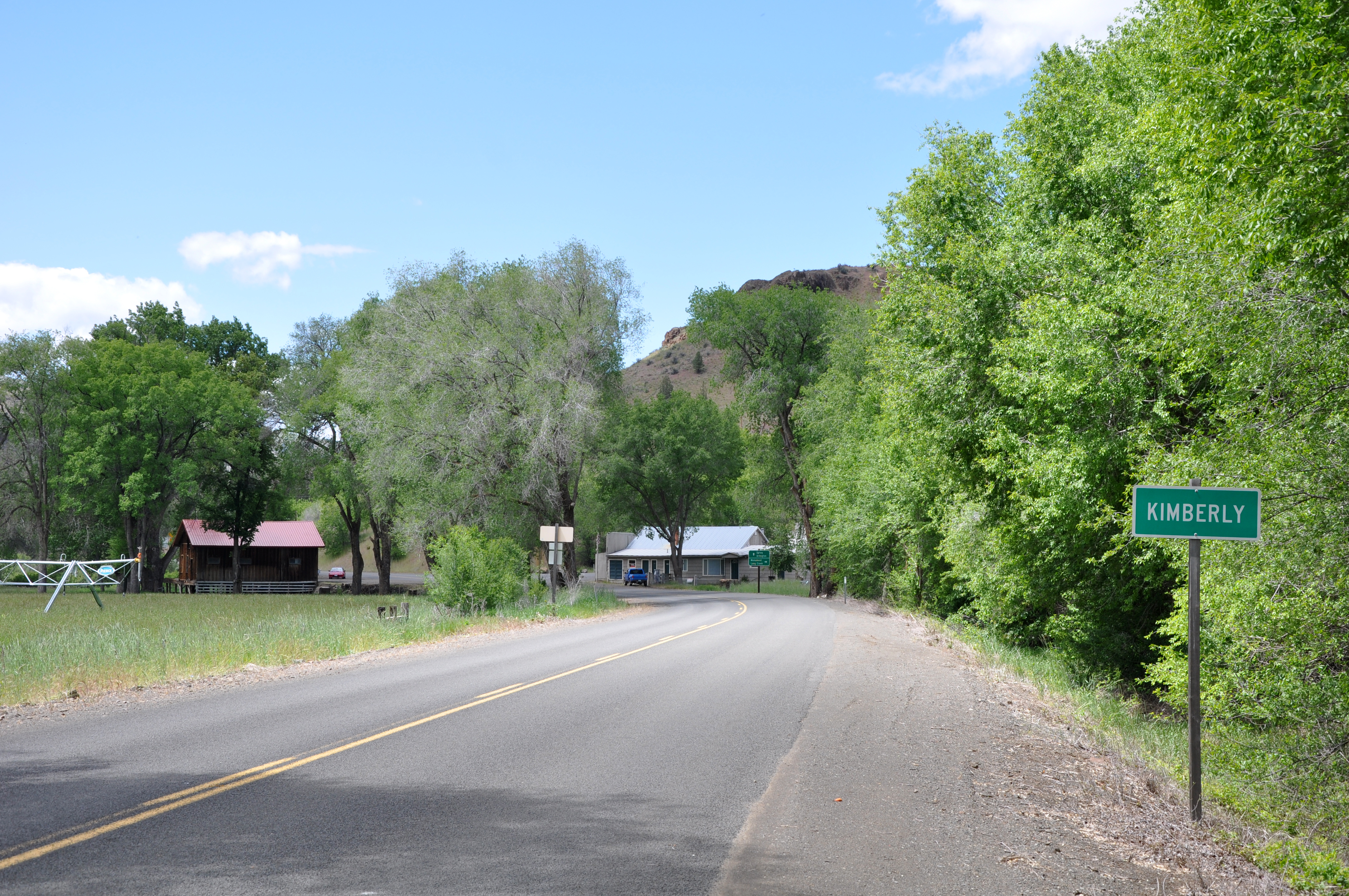
Looking west along Oregon Route 19 at Kimberly

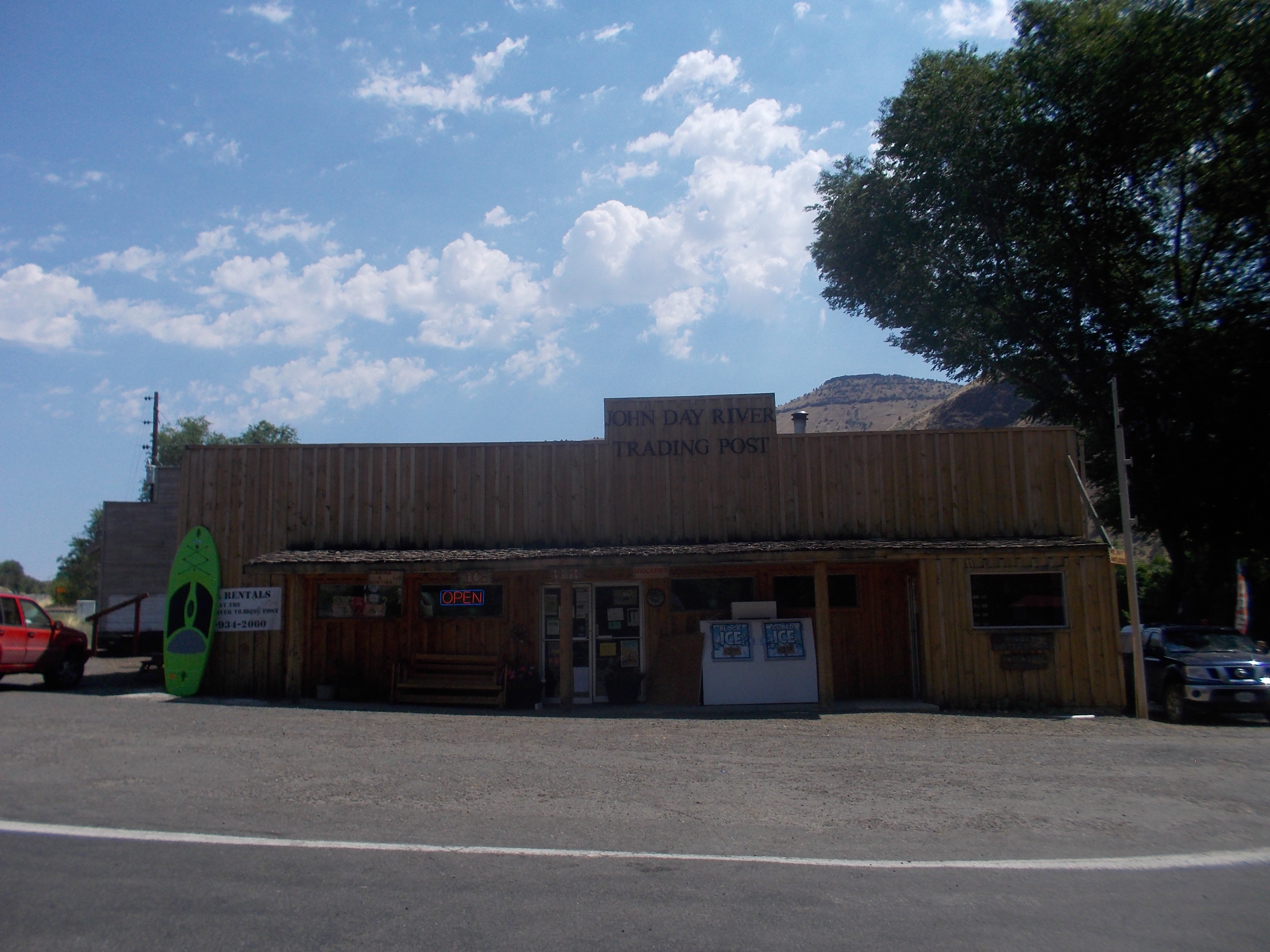
The John Day River Trading Post

Kimberly is an unincorporated community in Grant County, Oregon, United States. It is located at the intersection of Oregon Route 19 and Oregon Route 402 and the confluence of the John Day and the North Fork John Day rivers.

Kimberly was named after the prominent local Kimberly family. Orin Kimberly established the first commercial orchard in the area in the 1930s.

The James Cant Ranch Museum and the Thomas Condon Visitor Center of the John Day Fossil Beds National Monument are located south of Kimberly on Route 19.

== Climate ==
This region experiences moderately warm and dry summers, with no average monthly temperatures above 71.6 °F (22.0 °C). According to the Köppen Climate Classification system, Kimberly has a warm-summer Mediterranean climate, abbreviated "Csb" on climate maps.
