= Mitchell School District =

Mitchell School
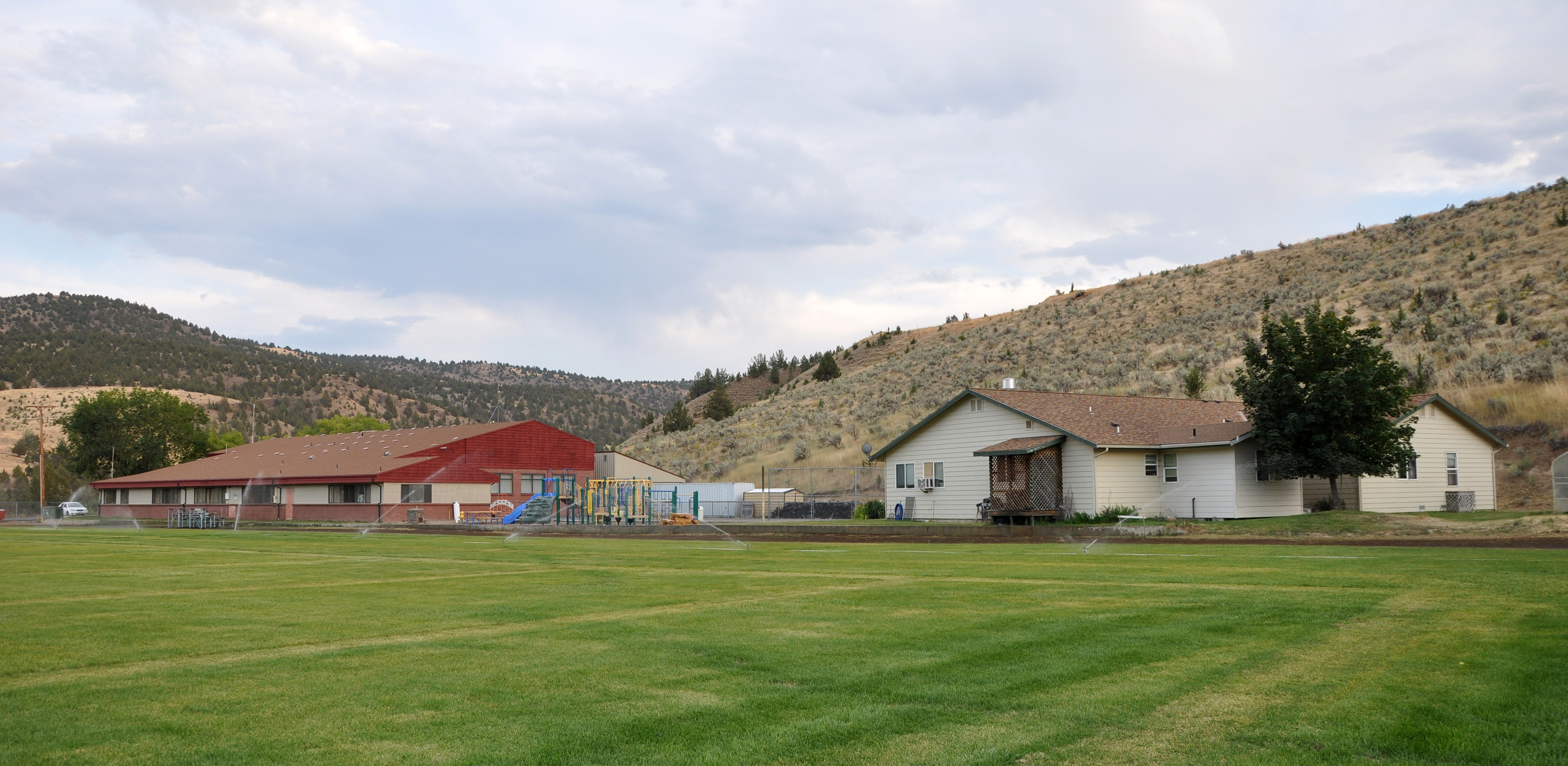

Location
- 340 SE High Street; Mitchell, Wheeler County, Oregon 97750; United States
- Coordinates: 44.564195°N 120.146683°W

Information
- Type: Public
- School district: Mitchell School District
- Principal: Vincent Swagerty
- Grades: K-12
- Enrollment: 57 in 2013–14
- Colors: Blue and gold
- Athletics conference: OSAA Big Sky League 1A-6
- Mascot: Loggers
- Website: www.mitchell.k12.or.us

Mitchell School is a public school in Mitchell in the U.S. state of Oregon with an enrollment of about 70 students. The K–12 school is the only school in the Mitchell School District, which covers sections of Wheeler County, including Mitchell.

Mitchell School operates a boarding residence for up to 20 students in grades 9 through 12. The dormitory opened midway in September 1992 as a way of keeping the student populations up as the native population of the county declined. Some students were enrolled in the dormitory to put them in a more structured environment away from urban life. In 2020 the dormitory had 12 students. These students come from all over the world as well as all over Oregon. During the 2013–2014 school year, they included students from Thailand, Hong Kong, Germany, Mexico and Spain.

== Academics ==
In 2008, 100 percent of the school's seniors received their high school diploma. Of 2 students, 2 graduated and 0 dropped out.

== Campus ==
The school closed its dormitory during the COVID-19 pandemic in Oregon with a scheduled reopening in August 2021.
