= Mitchell, Oregon =

- City
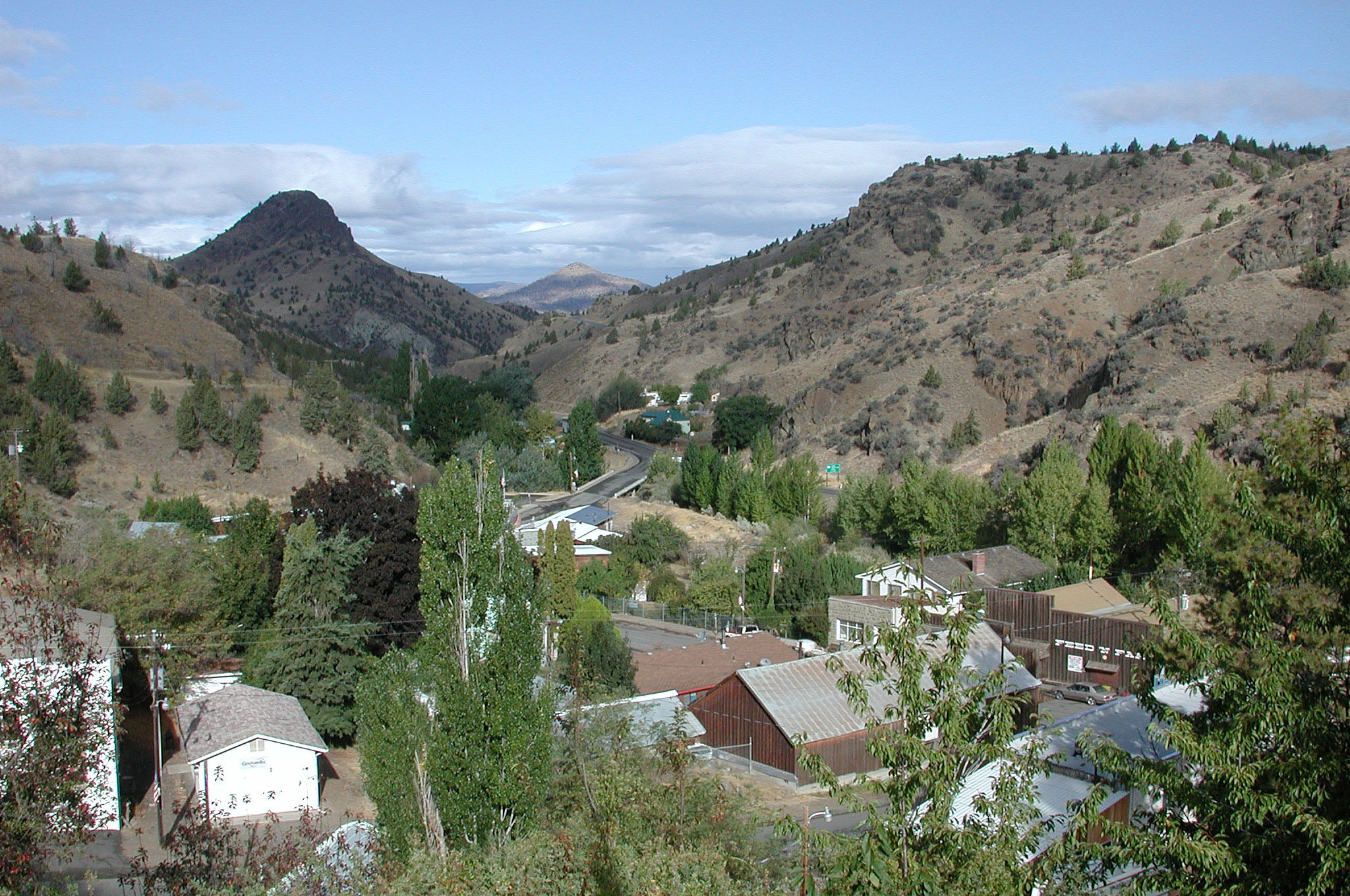
- Main Street as seen from High Street

- Location in Oregon
- Coordinates: 44°34′2″N 120°9′13″W
- Country: United States
- State: Oregon
- County: Wheeler
- Incorporated: 1891; 135 years ago

Government
  - Mayor: Jake Crawford

Area
  - Total: 1.28 sq mi (3.31 km^{2})
  - Land: 1.28 sq mi (3.31 km^{2})
  - Water: 0 sq mi (0.00 km^{2})
- Elevation: 2,777 ft (846.4 m)

Population (2020)
  - Total: 138
  - Density: 108/sq mi (41.7/km^{2})
- Time zone: UTC-8 (Pacific)
  - Summer (DST): UTC-7 (Pacific)
- ZIP code: 97750
- Area code: 541
- FIPS code: 41-49150
- GNIS feature ID: 1146370
- Website: www.mitchelloregon.us

Mitchell is a city in Wheeler County, Oregon, United States. The population was 138 at the 2020 census. It was founded in 1873 and was named after John H. Mitchell, a politician.

The Painted Hills unit of the John Day Fossil Beds National Monument is about 9 miles (14 km) northwest of Mitchell. Mitchell School, a public school with an enrollment of about 70 students, is in Mitchell.

== History ==
=== Foundation ===
At the request of William "Brawdie" Johnson, a blacksmith, a post office was established at Mitchell in 1873. Johnson, the first postmaster, suggested the name Mitchell after John Hipple Mitchell, a U.S. Senator from Oregon. Senator Mitchell held the office in 1873−1879, 1885−1897, and 1901−1905. Platted in 1885, the community was incorporated in 1893.

In 1872 the first school in Wheeler County was established near Mitchell, and in 1874 it was relocated into the town itself.

=== Early town ===
Over the next two decades, Mitchell grew to include a store, assay office, two churches, two hotels, a livery stable, three houses of ill-repute (one of which is still standing), five saloons, a flour mill, and an apothecary. There were also two newspapers: The Sentinel and The News.

The business district, including the saloons, grew up along Bridge Creek and became known locally as "Tiger Town". The church and most of the city's homes were built at higher elevation on a bench overlooking the creek; this part of town was known locally as "Piety Hill". About half the town was destroyed by fire in 1899, but it was later rebuilt.

=== Three catastrophic flash floods ===
Since its founding, Mitchell has experienced three catastrophic flash floods along Bridge Creek, which runs through the center of the city. Flooding caused great damage to the city in 1884 and 1904.

The third flood occurred on July 13, 1956, shortly after an intense thunderstorm in the hills to the south. Bridge Creek is usually less than 12 inches (30 cm) deep during July, but minutes after the thunderstorm a 50-foot (15 m) wall of water surged through Mitchell, destroying or heavily damaging 20 buildings in the city and several bridges over the creek. Eight people were killed including a family of four who were swept away and never recovered.

An observer from the United States Geological Survey estimated that about 4 inches (10 cm) of rain had fallen in about 50 minutes at the storm's center. Total damage from the flood, which also caused extensive damage to crops and roads in a nearby valley, was US$709,000 (equivalent to about $8,396,000 in 2025).

=== Oregon's first dinosaur fossil ===
In 2018, a geologist from the University of Oregon found a fossilized toe of a plant-eating dinosaur near Mitchell, where the Pacific Ocean coast lay 100 million years ago. This discovery has been billed as the first dinosaur fossil found in Oregon.

A competing claim involves fossil fragments of a hadrosaur or duck-billed dinosaur found in the Otter Point Formation near the mouth of the Rogue River.

== Geography and climate ==
Mitchell, in southwestern Wheeler County, is on U.S. Route 26 just east of its intersection with Oregon Route 207. By highway, the city is 47 miles (76 km) east of Prineville and 60 miles (97 km) west of John Day. To the city's south lie the Ochoco Mountains, the source of Bridge Creek. It flows through Mitchell and then north through the Painted Hills to the John Day River.

Eroded remnants of ancient stratovolcanoes, once the size of Mount Hood are nearby; these include Black Butte and White Butte, visible from town.

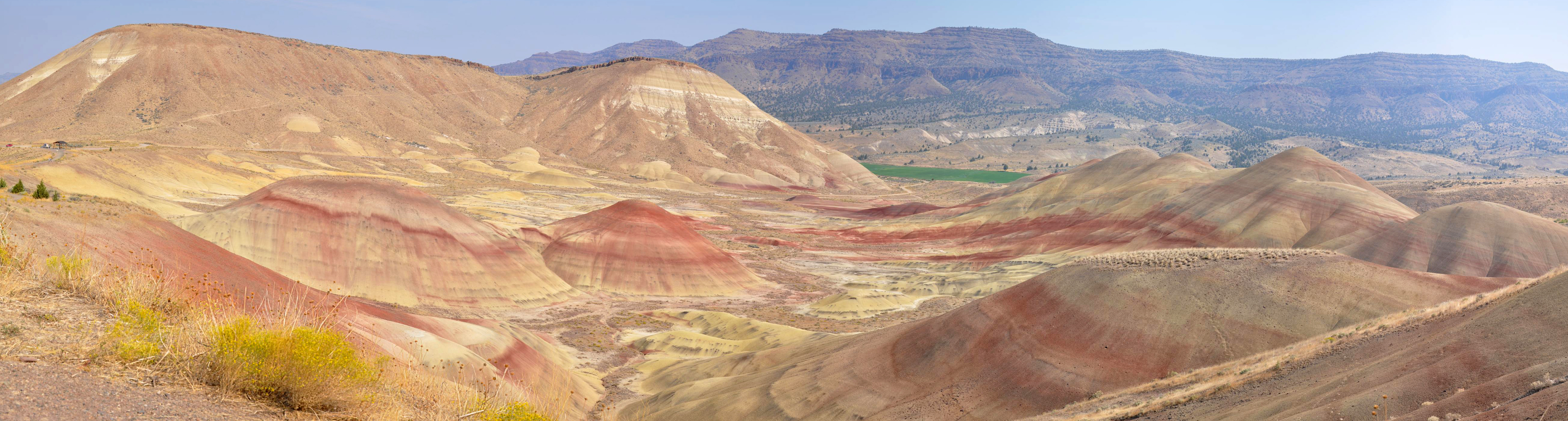
Panorama of the Painted Hills, northwest of Mitchell

According to the United States Census Bureau, the city has a total area of 1.26 square miles (3.26 km^{2}), all of it land.

Precipitation in the region is limited by the rain shadow effect of the Cascade Range and the Ochoco Mountains to the west. In winter, much of the precipitation arrives as snow.

== Demographics ==
Historical population
Census	Pop.	Note	%±
1900	135		—
1910	210		55.6%
1920	224		6.7%
1930	211		−5.8%
1940	219		3.8%
1950	415		89.5%
1960	236		−43.1%
1970	196		−16.9%
1980	183		−6.6%
1990	163		−10.9%
2000	170		4.3%
2010	130		−23.5%
2020	138		6.2%
U.S. Decennial Census

=== 2020 census ===
As of the 2020 census, Mitchell had a population of 138. The median age was 55.5 years. 14.5% of residents were under the age of 18 and 31.9% of residents were 65 years of age or older. For every 100 females there were 86.5 males, and for every 100 females age 18 and over there were 84.4 males age 18 and over.

0% of residents lived in urban areas, while 100.0% lived in rural areas.

There were 66 households in Mitchell, of which 28.8% had children under the age of 18 living in them. Of all households, 33.3% were married-couple households, 18.2% were households with a male householder and no spouse or partner present, and 39.4% were households with a female householder and no spouse or partner present. About 34.9% of all households were made up of individuals and 13.6% had someone living alone who was 65 years of age or older.

There were 87 housing units, of which 24.1% were vacant. Among occupied housing units, 60.6% were owner-occupied and 39.4% were renter-occupied. The homeowner vacancy rate was 2.4% and the rental vacancy rate was 10.3%.

Racial composition as of the 2020 census
Race	Number	Percent
White	122	88.4%
Black or African American	0	0%
American Indian and Alaska Native	4	2.9%
Asian	0	0%
Native Hawaiian and Other Pacific Islander	0	0%
Some other race	2	1.4%
Two or more races	10	7.2%
Hispanic or Latino (of any race)	9	6.5%

=== 2010 census ===
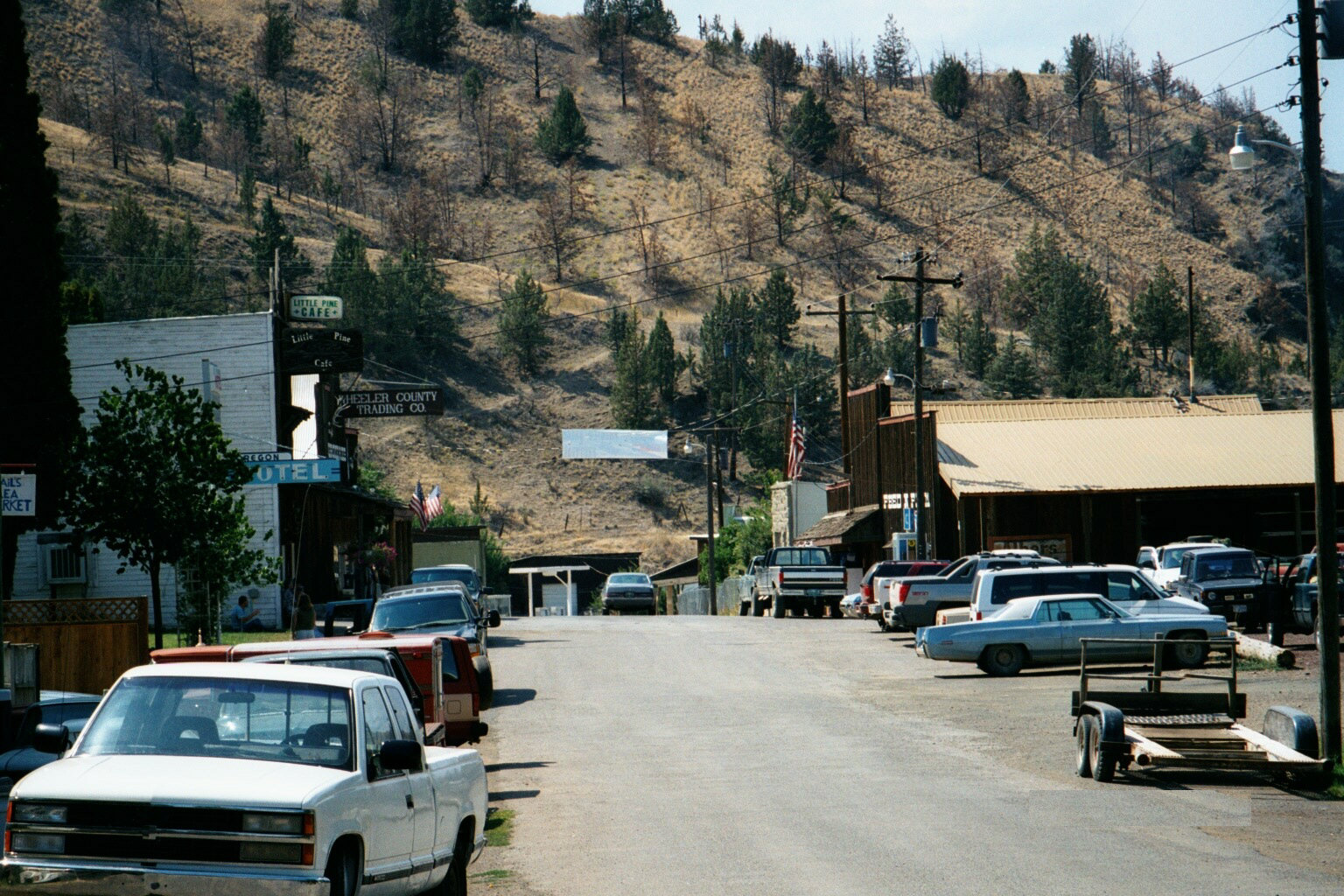
Downtown Mitchell

As of the census of 2010, there were 130 people, 61 households, and 39 families residing in the city. The population density was 103.2 inhabitants per square mile (39.8/km^{2}). There were 83 housing units at an average density of 65.9 per square mile (25.4/km^{2}). The racial makeup of the city was 92.3% White, 0.8% Native American, and 6.9% from two or more races. Hispanic or Latino of any race were 1.5% of the population.

There were 61 households, of which 18.0% had children under the age of 18 living with them, 50.8% were married couples living together, 4.9% had a female householder with no husband present, 8.2% had a male householder with no wife present, and 36.1% were non-families. 26.2% of all households were made up of individuals, and 9.8% had someone living alone who was age 65 or older. The average household size was 2.13 people and the average family size was 2.56 .

The median age in the city was 51.7 years. 15.4% of residents were under age 18; 4.6% were ages 18–24; 16.1% were ages 25–44; 33.1% were ages 45–64; and 30.8% were aged 65 years or older. The gender makeup of the city was 46.2% male and 53.8% female.

=== 2000 census ===
As of the census of 2000, there were 170 people, 75 households, and 42 families residing in the city. The population density was 144.6 people per square mile (55.6/km^{2}). There were 91 housing units at an average density of 77.4 per square mile (29.9/km^{2}). The racial makeup of the city was 90.00% White, 2.35% Native American, 1.18% Asian, 1.18% from other races, and 5.29% from two or more races. Hispanic or Latino of any race were 7.65% of the population.

There were 75 households, out of which 25.3% had children under the age of 18 living with them, 46.7% were married couples living together, 9.3% had a female householder with no husband present, and 42.7% were non-families. 38.7% of all households were made up of individuals, and 22.7% had someone living alone aged 65 years or older. The average household size was 2.27 people and the average family size was 2.79 .

In the city, the population was spread out, with 28.8% under age 18, 2.9% ages 18–24, 19.4% ages 25–44, 28.2% ages 45–64, and 20.6% aged 65 years or older. The median age was 42 years. For every 100 females there were 107.3 males. For every 100 females age 18 and over, there were 89.1 males.

The median income for a household in the city was $20,417, and the median income for a family was $20,833. Males had a median income of $21,250 versus $23,125 for females. The per capita income for the city was $13,906. About 26.9% of families and 28.7% of the population were below the poverty line, including 43.5% of those under age 18 and none of those age 65 or over.

== Education ==
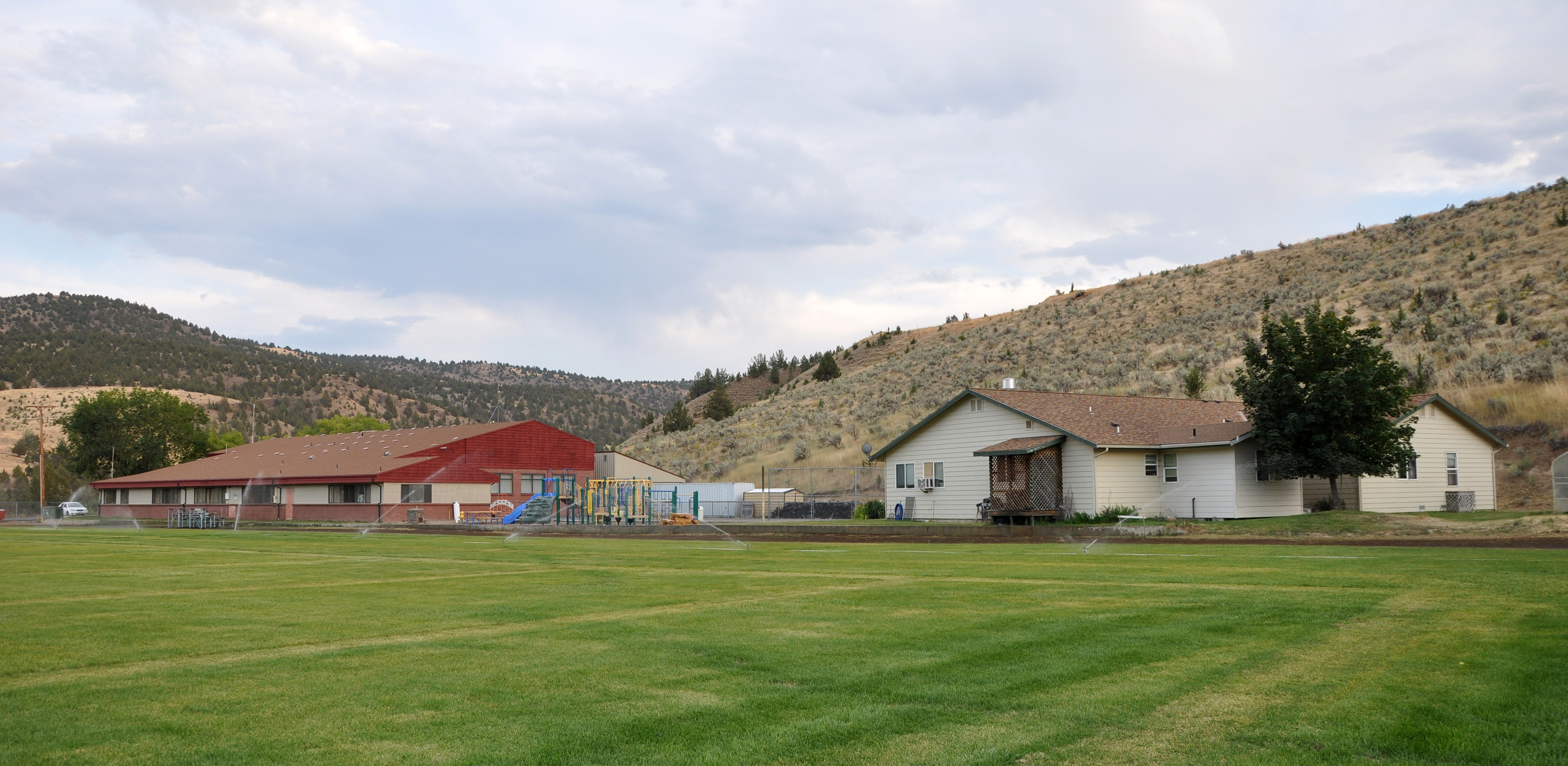
Mitchell School

Mitchell School District is the local school district.

The county is not a part of a community college district.

== Tourism ==
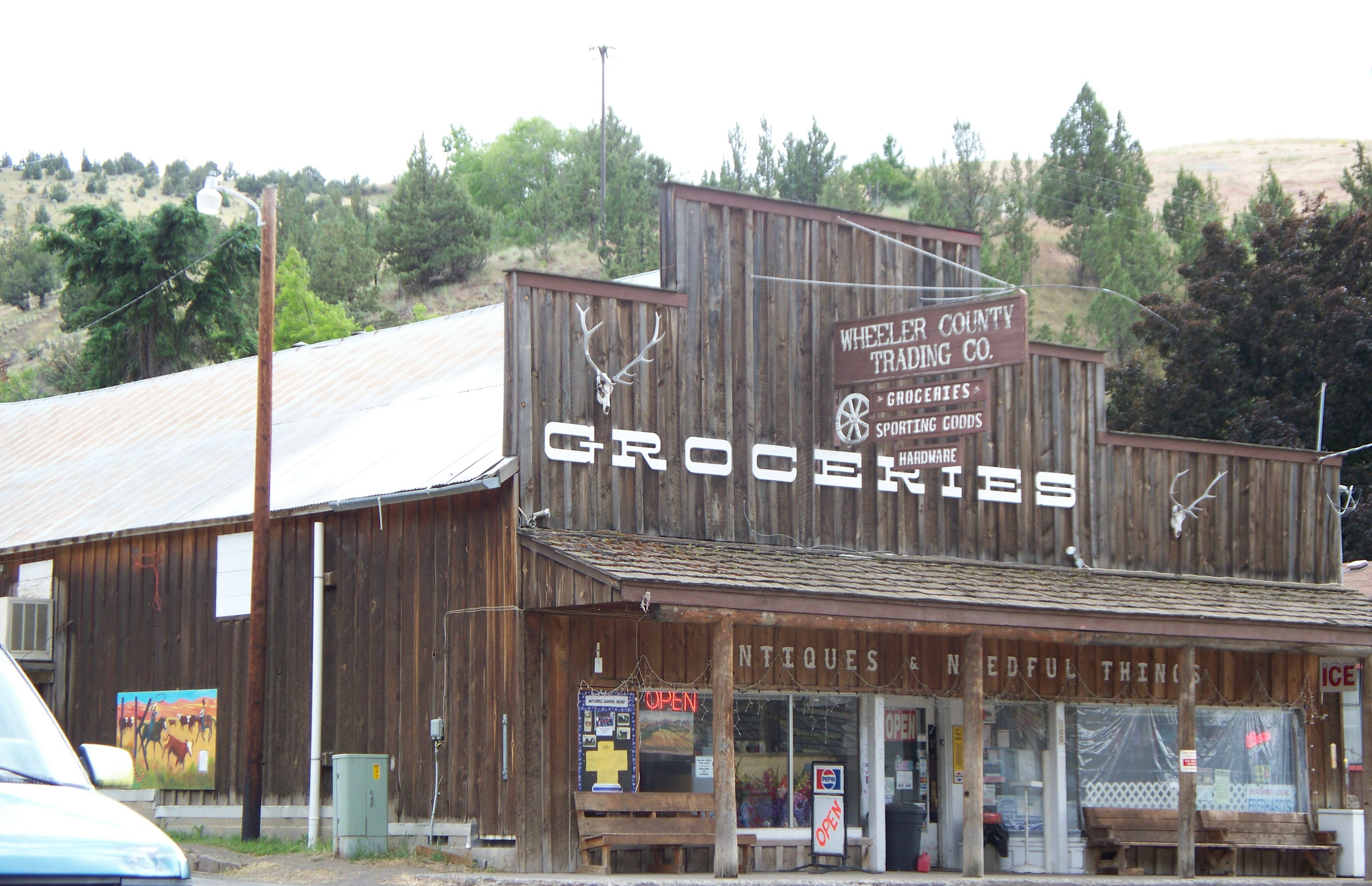
Trading post

Mitchell holds two festivals each year:

- The Painted Hills Festival is held each Labor Day weekend. This includes a half marathon, 5K and 10K, parade, show horses, fire trucks, Red Hat ladies, motorcycle show, games, watermelon eating contests, dunk tank, karaoke, and live entertainment. Craft vendors and food vendors line the street and city park. A quilt show is held at the Community Hall. The day ends with a street dance to live bands.
- Tiger Town Music Festival is held annually on the second weekend in June, and features bands from all over the Pacific Northwest from 9 am–10 pm.

== In popular culture ==
In the novel World War Z, by Max Brooks, the people of Mitchell are almost entirely infected and turned into zombies. Instead of being cleared, the town is sealed and is turned into the K-9 Urban Warfare school, where military dogs are trained with live zombies.
