= James Cant Ranch Historic District =

Historic district in Oregon, United States

- U.S. National Register of Historic Places
- U.S. Historic district
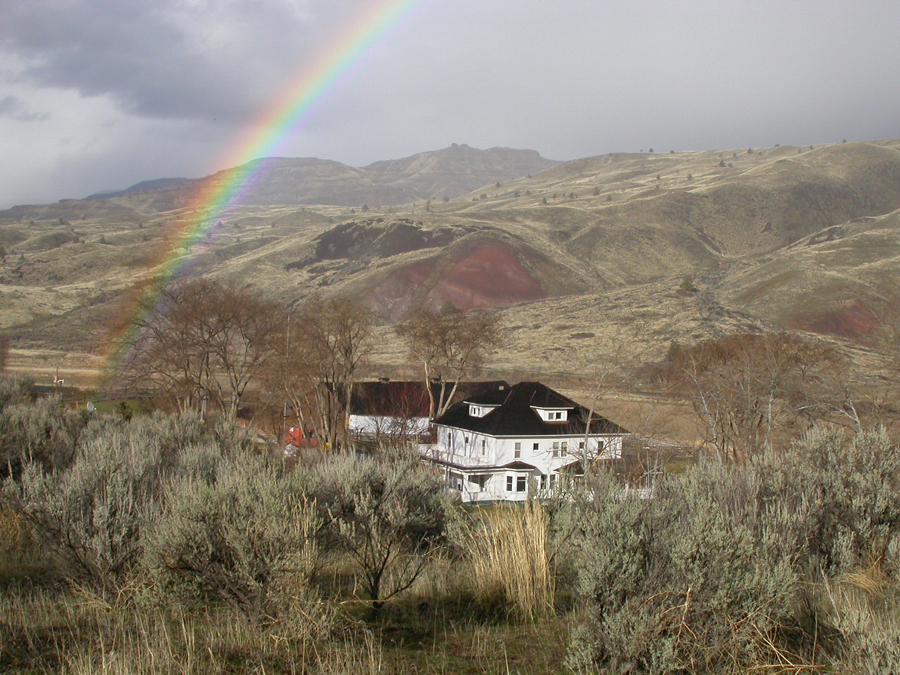
- James Cant Ranch complex

- Location within Oregon Location within the United States
- Location: John Day Fossil Beds National Monument
- Nearest city: Dayville, Oregon
- Coordinates: 44°33′21″N 119°38′43″W
- Area: Approx. 200 acres (81 ha)
- Built: 1915–1918
- Architect: Radford Architectural Company
- Architectural style: Common wood frame
- NRHP reference No.: 84003000
- Added to NRHP: June 21, 1984

The James Cant Ranch is a pioneer ranch complex in Grant County in eastern Oregon, United States. The ranch is located on both sides of the John Day River in the John Day Fossil Beds National Monument. The ranch was originally homesteaded by Floyd Officer in 1890. Officer sold the property to James Cant in 1910. Cant increased the size of the property and built a modern ranch complex on the west bank of the river. The National Park Service bought the ranch from the Cant family in 1975, and incorporated the property into the John Day Fossil Beds National Monument. The National Park Service used the main house as a visitor center until 2003. Today, the Cant Ranch complex is preserved as an interpretive site showing visitors an early 20th-century livestock ranch. The James Cant Ranch is listed on the National Register of Historic Places.

== Early history ==
Native Americans used the area around the John Day River for thousands of years before the arrival of European settlers. While boundaries were never clearly defined, the site that is now the Cant Ranch was used for seasonal hunting and fishing camps by Warm Springs and Umatilla bands, both Sahaptin speaking Columbia Plateau peoples. By the nineteenth century, Northern Paiutes had migrated north from the Great Basin and were also using portions of the upper John Day watershed.

As a result of the arid climate, only a few trappers and prospectors traveled through the area before 1862 when gold was discovered in Canyon Creek, tributary of the John Day River. The discovery of gold drew a large number of miners to the area. This led to the founding of a number of mining towns in northeastern Oregon. The largest of these towns was Canyon City. A wagon road, formalized in 1869 as The Dalles Military Road between Fort Dalles on the Columbia River and Canyon City, encouraged additional growth.

Permanent homesteaders began arriving in the John Day Valley shortly after the miners. The Homestead Act of 1862 encouraged settlement by offering grants of 160 acres (0.65 km^{2}) to American pioneers. Livestock operations in the John Day area supplied isolated mining towns with fresh meat. Initially, most ranches produced beef cattle. However, sheep were the primary ranch stock by the 1890s. This coincided with a wave of Scottish, Irish, and Basque immigrants who were experienced sheep herders.

In 1890, Floyd Officer homesteaded land in the Butler Basin along the John Day River. He worked the property for seven years before securing a 160-acre (0.65 km^{2}) land patent in 1898. That same year, he married Sylvia Fitzgerald and together they began a hard pioneer life on their remote homestead. Because of his knowledge of the Butler Basin and Sheep Rock areas, Officer served as a guide for pioneer paleontologist Thomas Condon during several of his fossil hunting expeditions. The Officers sold the ranch in 1910, moving to Dayville where their children could attend school. The property was purchased by James Cant and his partner John Mason for $4,000. It included 357 acres (1.44 km^{2}) in Grant County and 320 adjoining acres (1.3 km^{2}) in Wheeler County. Cant bought out Mason's share in the property in 1915.

== James Cant ==
James Cant was born in Scotland in 1879. He left Scotland at the age of 20 for South America, where he spent five years raising horses and mules. He immigrated to the United States in 1905. After arriving in New York City, Cant traveled overland to the John Day country of Oregon, an area that already had many Scottish immigrants. Alexander Murray, who owned a large ranch west of Dayville, hired Cant as a sheep herder. By 1908, Cant had saved enough money to send for his childhood sweetheart, Elizabeth Grant, who was still in Scotland. They were married in Canyon City on October 10, 1908. Cant continued to work on the Murray ranch for two more years, until he had saved enough to join with Mason in purchasing the Officer ranch.

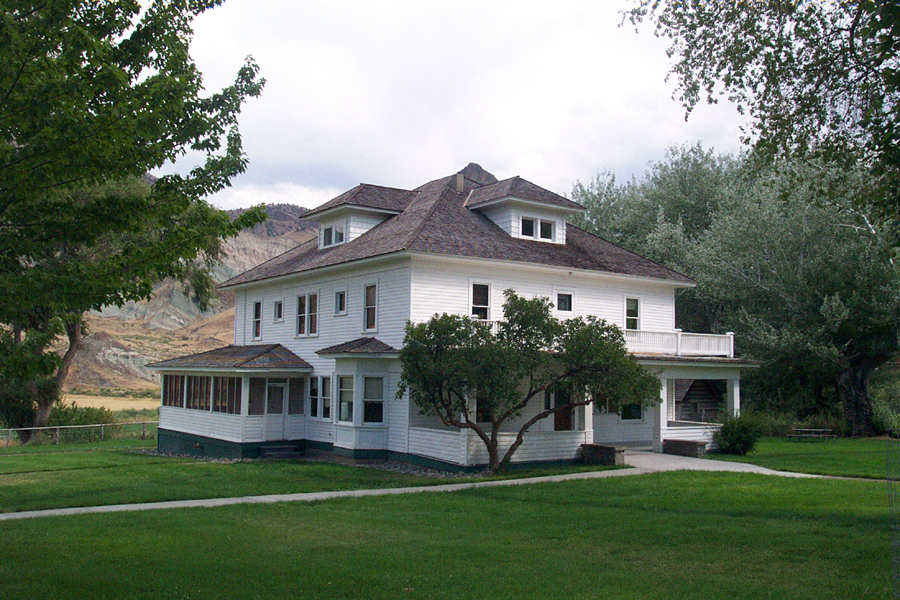
The main house at the historic James Cant Ranch

After Cant and his wife moved to the ranch, it became a popular overnight stop for people traveling between Dayville and the Columbia River. Their hospitality was well known, and it was not uncommon for the Cants to serve dinner to twenty or more people including family, ranch hands, and traveling guest. To accommodate their growing family, an expanding livestock business and their many guests, the Cants undertook a major expansion of the ranch between 1915 and 1918, replacing most of the original building constructed by the Officer family. As part of this expansion, Cant built a large main house that became the centerpiece of the ranch complex.

In the 1920s, Cant acquired more land to expand his successful sheep business. He also improved the landscape around the main house, adding a large lawn, fencing the yard, and planting numerous shrubs and trees. The most important change was made by the State of Oregon, when it began construction of Highway 19 from Arlington on the Columbia River to Dayville. The highway follows the John Day River, passing just west of the Cant Ranch complex. It was completed in the mid-1920s, effectively ending the Cant's isolation. However, the highway was not paved until the mid-1930s.

The Cant family kept their sheep operation going through the Great Depression. It recovered some during World War II; however, the shortage of labor made raising sheep increasingly difficult. As a result, Cant transitioned from sheep to cattle production in 1946. Over the next three decades the Cant's cattle operation grew and prospered. By 1965, the Cant ranch covered 6,500 acres (26 km^{2}) plus an additional 4,500 acres (18 km^{2}) leased from the Bureau of Land Management. At that time the ranch was sending 500 to 600 cattle to market each year. James Cant died in 1972, and his wife died in 1973. The Cant family sold the ranch to the National Park Service in 1975 to be incorporated into the new John Day Fossil Beds National Monument.

== National Park Service ==
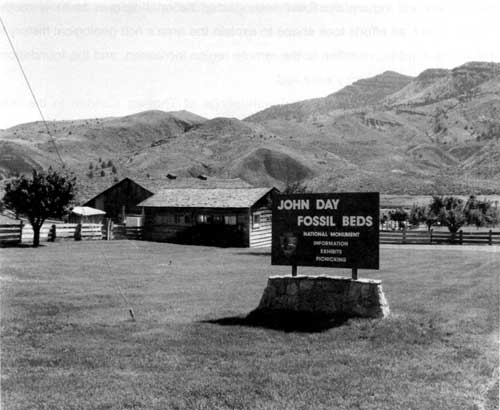
National Park Service headquarters at the Cant Ranch

When the John Day Fossil Beds National Monument was established in 1975, the initial development plan recommended purchasing the Cant Ranch complex for use as the monument's headquarters and visitor center. The National Park Service purchased 878 acres (3.55 km^{2}) from the Cant family in 1975. This included the main ranch complex and adjacent ranch property along the John Day River. The National Park Service used the main house as a visitor center, museum, and office until the Thomas Condon Visitor Center was built in 2003. The ranch complex is now used as an interpretive site, giving visitors the experience of an early 20th-century livestock operation. The main house and several of the other buildings are open to the public.

Today, the Cant Ranch offers visitors the opportunity to experience eastern Oregon's ranching heritage. Because the ranch played an important role in the commercial and social development of the John Day River Valley, the Cant Ranch was listed on the National Register of Historic Places in 1984. This historic district covers approximately 200 acres (81 ha) along both sides of the John Day River. There are eleven historic buildings on the property.

== Structures ==
During the 1930s, there were at least seventeen buildings in the Cant Ranch complex. Today, there are eleven ranch buildings in the Cant Ranch Historic District. They are the main ranch house, a bunkhouse, a watchman's cabin, the barn and adjoining sheep pens, a workshop, general purpose shed, chicken coop, feed storage shed, privy, and an Officer era log cabin. There is also a small cabin on the east bank of the river known as Christina’s Cabin; however, it is in very poor condition and is not open to the public. The Cant family built two hand-operated cable cars for crossing the river, but only one is still operational. The ranch property displays original irrigation ditches, fences, gates, and feed racks plus vintage equipment purchased from the Cant family in 1978.

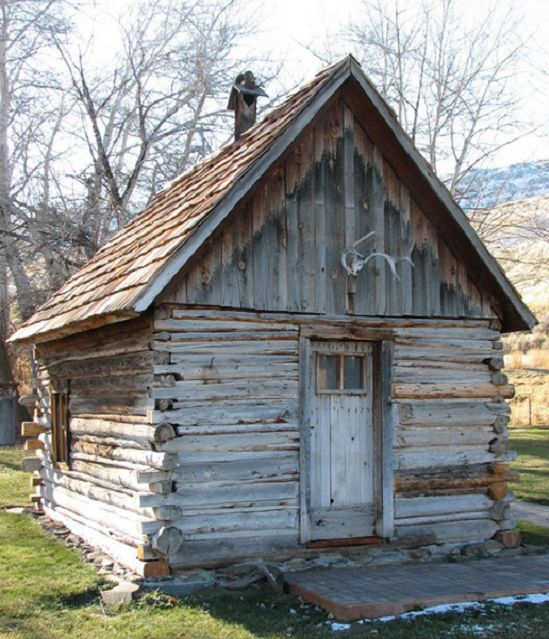
Log cabin built by Floyd Officer in the 1890s

The main house is the most prominent building at the ranch. It was built sometime between 1915 and 1918. It is based on architectural designs from The Radford American Homes catalog, published 1903 by the Radford Architectural Company of Chicago. Cant hired two carpenters, Andrew Cress and Clarence Bisbee, to oversee construction of the house. The builders combined design features from several Radford plans to create the Cant's ranch house.

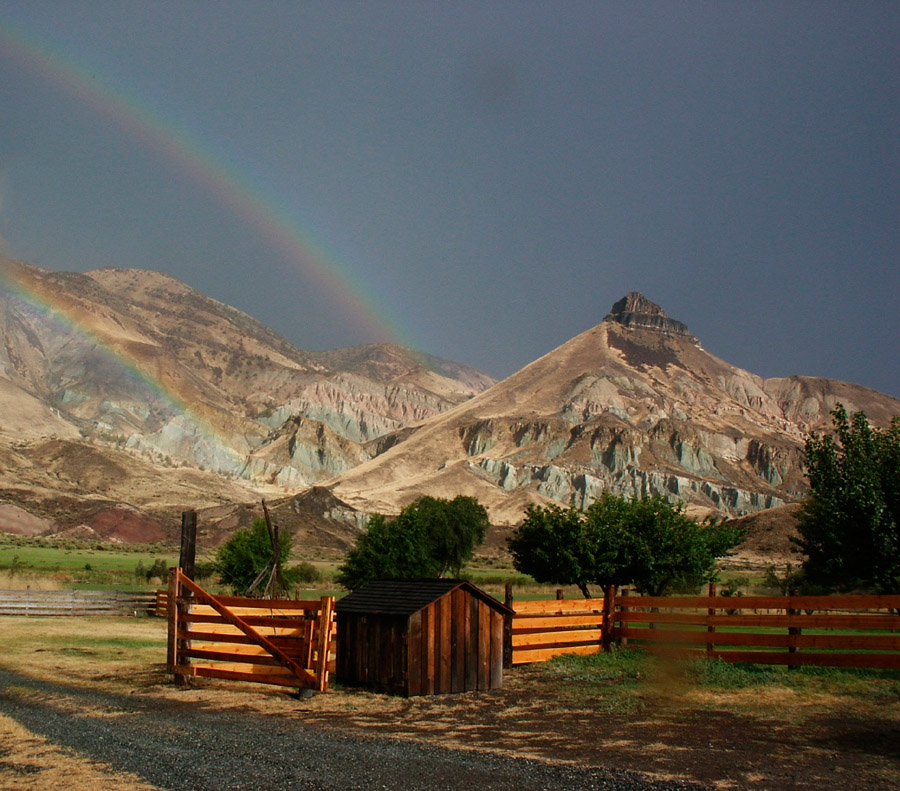
Sheep Rock looking south from the Cant Ranch

The front of the main house faces Highway 19 with the back porch overlooking the river. The house is a two and one-half-story, wood-frame structure with a hip roof. It has wide porches that run the full length of the east and west sides of the structure. The eastern, river-view porch extends around the house, continuing about half the building's length along the north and south sides. The first floor is built around a central hallway that runs from front to back (east to west). Located off the main hall are a living room, dining room, kitchen, parlor, bedroom, bathroom, and a storage room. An open stairway in the central hall leads to the second floor. There are six bedrooms and a bathroom on the second floor. The third floor is a single open room that the Cant family used as a school room and as a gathering place for large social event.

The other ranch buildings are all simple wood-frame structures. The barn was built about 1920. It is a 1 1/2-story timber-frame structure. Its footprint is approximately 60 feet (18 m) by 120 feet (37 m). The barn has vertical board siding and a gable roof with wood-shingles. Inside there are twelve bays divided into a number of stalls, holding pens, and storage areas. Attached to the north end of the barn is a single-story structure with stalls for sheep shearing. This structure is approximately 20 feet (6.1 m) by 60 feet (18 m). There is a workshop and a small shed west of the barn. The National Park Service uses these building for their original purposes. The larger building is a maintenance shop and the small structure is used for general-purpose storage. East of the barn is a one-room wood-frame watchman's cabin, used by shepherds during the lambing season.

Closer to the main house is a bunkhouse, chicken-coop, feed storage shed, and a privy. All are wood-frame structures with wood-shingle roofs. After the National Park Service purchased the Cant property, the bunkhouse was renovated and used to house exhibits. The chick-coop still houses live chickens and the shed is used to store feed and ranch equipment. The National Park Service also replaced the original roofs on all these buildings in the 1980s to help preserve the structures. There is also small log cabin behind the main house. It is the only remaining structure that dates back to the Officer homestead period. The Officer family used the log cabin for storage, as did the Cant family.

== Location ==
The Cant Ranch national historic district is located along the John Day River in northeastern Oregon. The elevation of the ranch is 2,244 feet (684 m) above sea level. Sheep Rock is a prominent geographic feature located approximately 1 mile (1.6 km) southeast of the ranch complex and can easily be seen from the ranch. There is a 0.5-mile (0.80 km) hiking trail, known as the Sheep Rock Overlook Trail, that begins at the Cant Ranch and leads to an overlook with a view of the valley.

The Cant Ranch is located within the boundaries of the Sheep Rock Unit of the John Day Fossil Beds National Monument. Highway 19 runs through the ranch property on the west side of the John Day River. The ranch complex is located on the east side of the roadway. The Thomas Condon Visitor Center is located across the highway from the ranch complex.

The ranch is 8 miles (13 km) northeast of Dayville, Oregon. From Dayville, travel west 2 miles (3.2 km) on Highway 26 and then turn north on Highway 19. The ranch is 20 miles (32 km) southeast of Spray, Oregon, on Highway 19. This route passed through the small unincorporated community of Kimberly, Oregon, 14 miles (23 km) north of the ranch.

== See also ==
- National Register of Historic Places listings in Grant County, Oregon
