= North Fork John Day River =

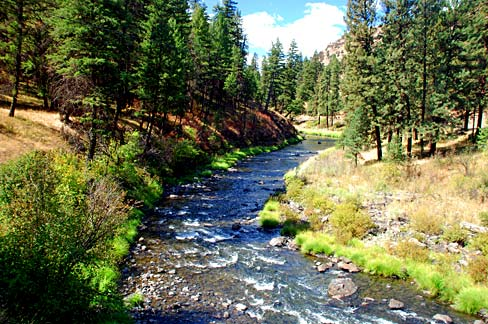
- The river flowing beside Highway 395 in Umatilla County

- Location of the mouth of the North Fork John Day River in Oregon
- Etymology: John Day, fur trapper

Location
- Country: United States
- State: Oregon
- County: Grant County, Umatilla County

Physical characteristics
- Source
  - location: Blue Mountains near Mount Ireland, Grant County, Oregon
  - coordinates: 44°51′48″N 118°14′13″W
  - elevation: 7,466 ft (2,276 m)
- Mouth: John Day River
  - location: Kimberly, Grant County, Oregon
  - coordinates: 44°45′22″N 119°38′19″W
  - elevation: 1,834 ft (559 m)
- Length: 107 mi (172 km)
- Basin size: 1,800 sq mi (4,700 km^{2})
- Discharge
  - location: Monument, Oregon, 15.3 miles (24.6 km) from mouth
  - average: 1,297 cu ft/s (36.7 m^{3}/s)
  - minimum: 6 cu ft/s (0.17 m^{3}/s)
  - maximum: 33,400 cu ft/s (950 m^{3}/s)

National Wild and Scenic River
- Type: Wild, Scenic, Recreational
- Designated: October 28, 1988

The North Fork John Day River is a 107-mile (172 km) tributary of the John Day River in the U.S. state of Oregon. It begins in Grant County about 20 miles (32 km) northwest of Baker City near the crest of the Blue Mountains. It flows generally west to the community of Dale on U.S. Route 395, then southwest through the city of Monument to the unincorporated community of Kimberly, where it meets the main stem of the John Day River.

The upper reaches of the river flow through the North Fork John Day Wilderness in the Wallowa–Whitman National Forest and the Umatilla National Forest. From its headwaters to its confluence with Camas Creek, the river is part of the National Wild and Scenic River system under the Wild and Scenic Rivers Act of 1968. The upper 27.8 miles (44.7 km) is classified wild, the next 10.5 miles (16.9 km) scenic, and the next 15.8 miles (25.4 km) recreational, for a total of 54.1 miles (87.1 km).

The North Fork John Day River is one of the most important in northeast Oregon for anadromous fish. Wildlife found near the river includes mule deer, elk, and black bears, peregrine falcons, and bald eagles. Recreational uses include hunting, fishing, horseback riding, hiking, snowmobiling, skiing, camping, and whitewater rafting.

== See also ==
- List of rivers of Oregon
- List of longest streams of Oregon
- List of National Wild and Scenic Rivers
