= Painted Hills =

Geologic site in Oregon, US

Coordinates: 44.661°N 120.273°W

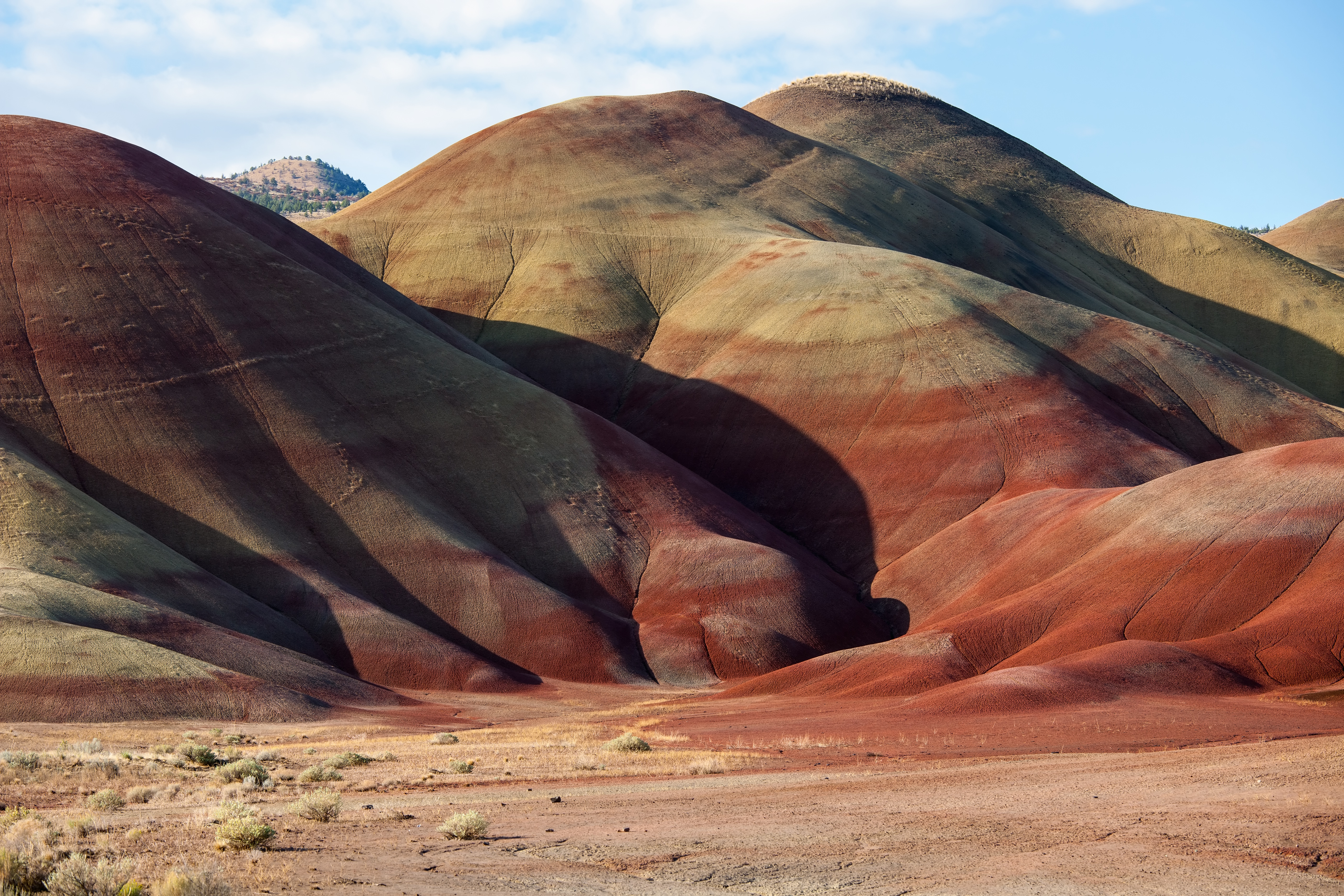

Location in Oregon

The Painted Hills is a geologic site in Wheeler County, Oregon that is one of the three units of the John Day Fossil Beds National Monument along with Sheep Rock and Clarno. It totals 3,132 acres (12.67 km^{2}) and is located 9 miles (14 km) northwest of Mitchell, Oregon. The Painted Hills are listed as one of the Seven Wonders of Oregon. The layers of color for which the site is named can be traced back to cycling periods of wet and dry climate conditions associated with the transition from the Eocene epoch to the cooler, more temperate Oligocene epoch. The different layers of colors are due to the soil being composed of a combination of mudstone, siltstone, shale and lignite.

== Geology ==
=== Formation ===
The Painted Hills began to form 35 million years ago when pumice and ash from volcanic eruptions in the Cascade Mountains traveled 100 miles east and settled over the area. Once there, the ash and other sediments were mixed by natural processes including the flow of water, growth of plants, and the movement of animals. Over time, this led to oxidation of the ash on the surface. Buried under new layers and deposits, the ash turned into soils by way of compaction and cementation. With more time and weathering, the exterior surfaces of The Painted Hills were worn into clay. Now, they are primarily made of hard claystone layers.

=== Layers ===
The colors of the Painted Hills come from the combination of elements including Aluminum, Silicon, Iron, Magnesium, Manganese, Sodium, Calcium, Phosphorus, Titanium, Potassium, Oxygen, and Hydrogen, among others, which arrived with the initial ash fall. Originally light in color, the ash mixed with soils and other elements to form the minerals that give the hills colors such as red, yellow, and black.

The alternating red and tan layers within the hills are the result of cycling climate conditions, which were alternately warm and wet or cool and dry for a period of time between 34 and 28 million years ago. As the mild, humid Eocene epoch gave way to the Oligocene, the tropical climate shifted, becoming cooler and drier. Red soils came from floodplain deposits during the more tropical periods, and are made up of laterites, or soils rich in iron and aluminum. These rust-colored layers are full of iron and oxygen in the form of iron oxide. The yellow layers are from a drier and cooler time and take on their yellow hue from iron and magnesium oxides.

The darker, black soil is lignite that was once vegetative matter that grew along the floodplain. The grey coloring is mudstone, siltstone, and shale. The black marks on the hills get their color from manganese oxide.

=== Fossils ===
Fossils are rare in the Painted Hills. The original deposits of ash arrived irregularly, creating poor conditions for fossilization, and most organic matter decayed. Still, it is possible to find leaf fossils from ancient lake beds throughout the hills. Many of the fossilized leaf impressions that have been found indicate the presence of plants and trees including redwood, cinnamon, fig, and alder, which correspond to the warmer, more humid climate that predominated during the early formation of the hills.

An abundance of fossil remains of early horses, camels, and rhinoceroses in the larger Painted Hills unit makes the area particularly important to vertebrate paleontologists.

== Recreation ==
The Painted Hills are listed as one of the Seven Wonders of Oregon. The Painted Hills unit is open year-round with access for all visitors, but recreation can take a toll on the landscape; visitors who step off the trails can disrupt the naturally occurring mineral layers, and damage the hills' visible features. There are several well-marked trails for visitors, who are encouraged to take a pledge to stay on the trails at all times: 'Don't Hurt the Dirt', and 'Leave No Trace'.

On any given day, depending on the weather and the moisture in the hills, visitors might find variations in the colors of the Painted Hills. Light reflects differently when they are wet, causing the shades of color to vary in brightness and hue.

In 2015, the annual visitor count at the Painted Hills rose from 45,849 to 74,873.

On August 21, 2017, the Great American Eclipse passed directly over the park, allowing visitors a duration of totality of just over 2 minutes, 4 seconds.

== Gallery ==
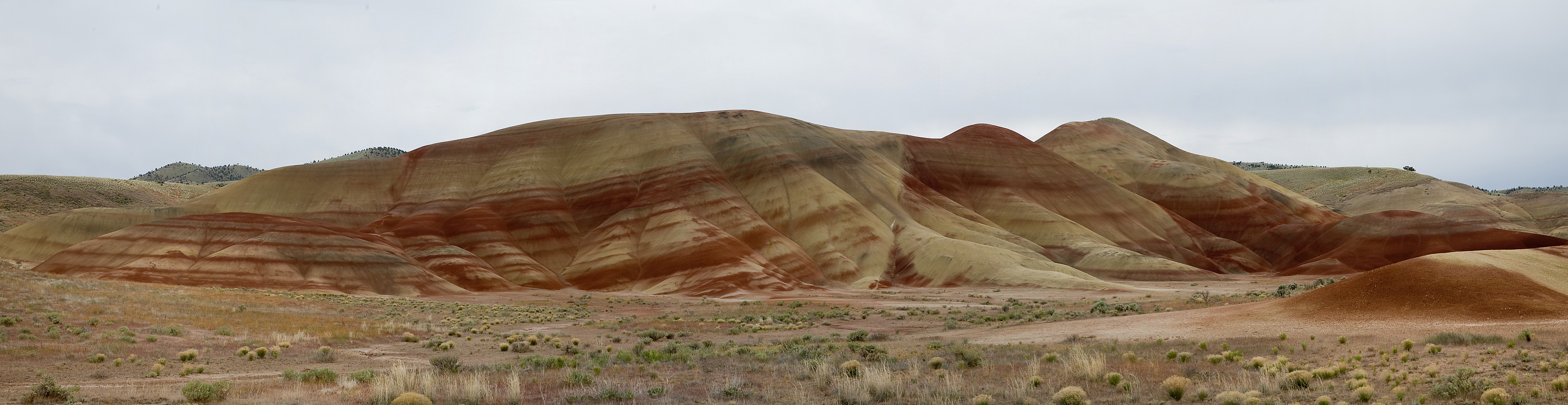
Painted Hills in the John Day Fossil Beds National Monument. This is a panorama stitched from five images.

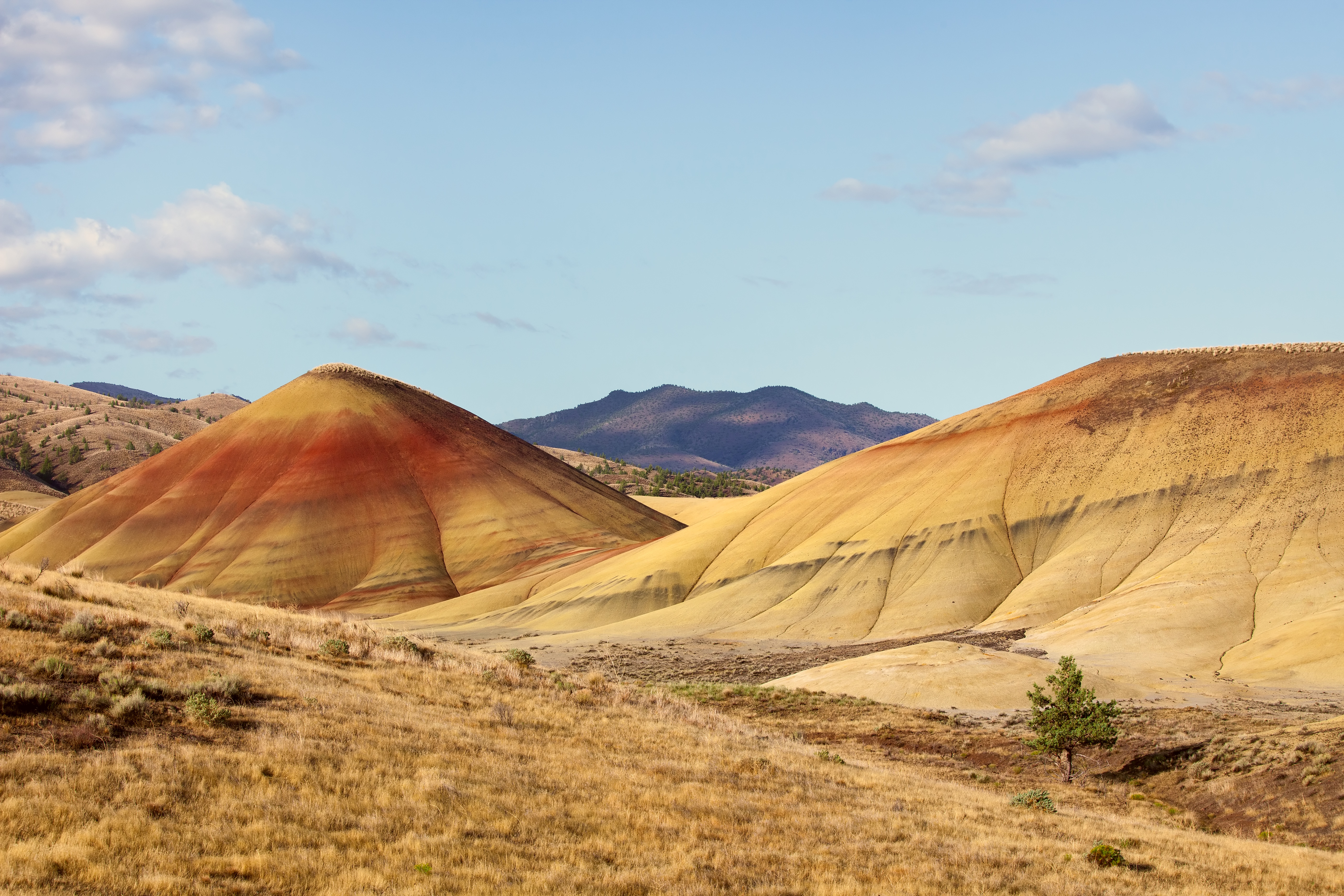

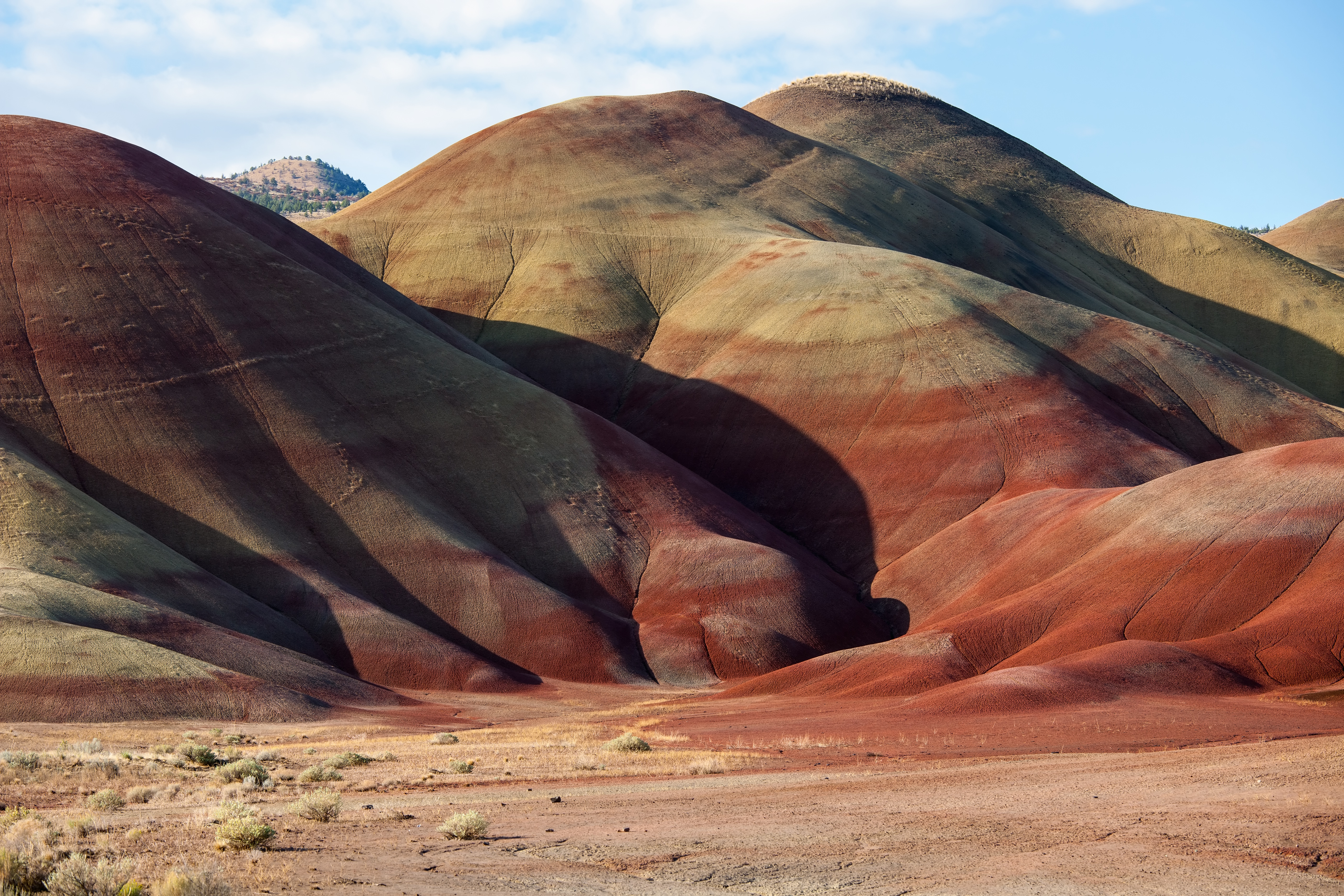

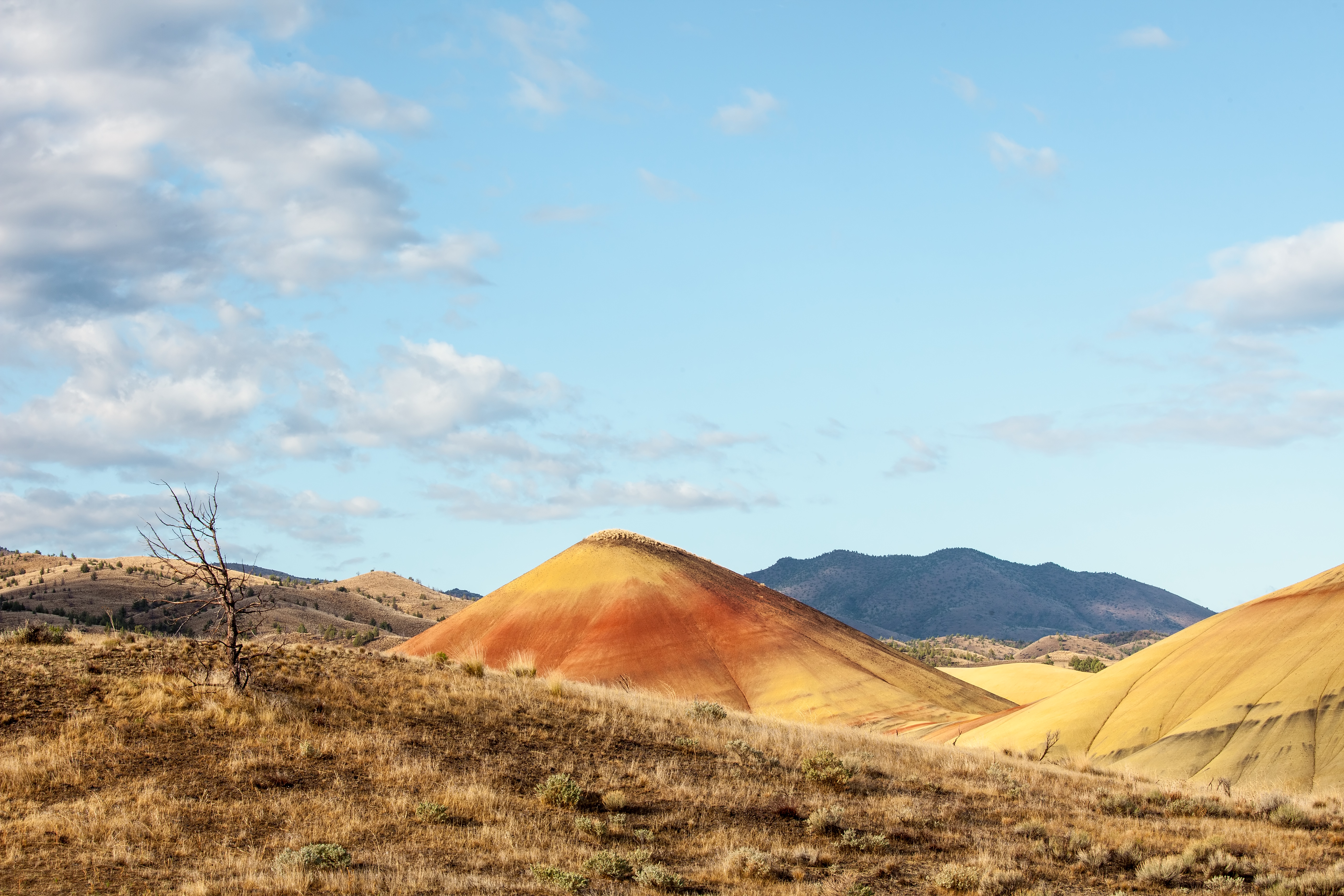

Bands of laterite give Painted Hills in the John Day Fossil Beds National Monument near Mitchell, Oregon their colorful appearance.
