= List of mountain peaks of Oregon =

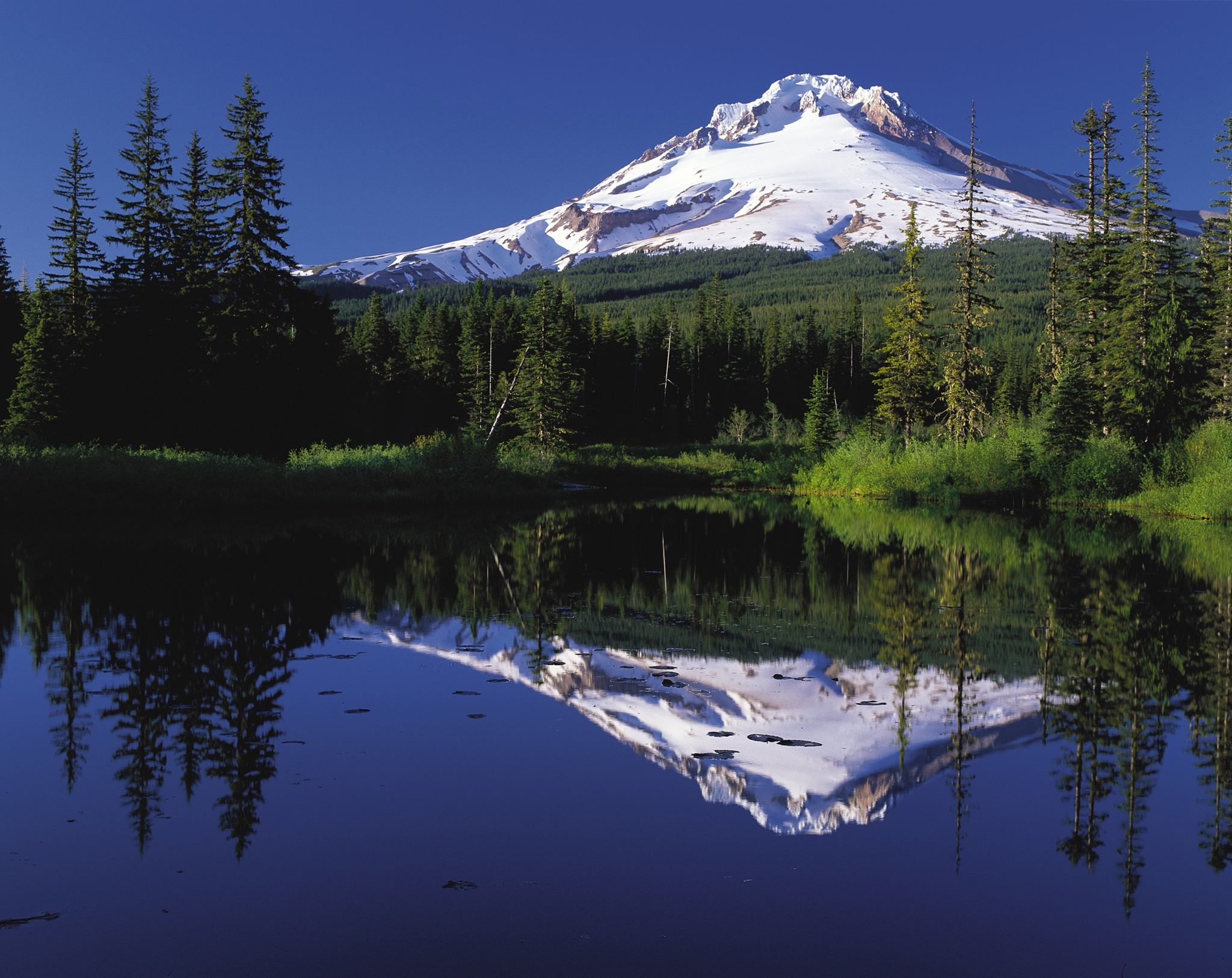
Mount Hood is the highest summit of the U.S. State of Oregon.

This article comprises three sortable tables of major mountain peaks of the U.S. State of Oregon.

The summit of a mountain or hill may be measured in three principal ways:

1. The topographic elevation of a summit measures the height of the summit above a geodetic sea level. The first table below ranks the 30 highest major summits of Oregon by elevation.
2. The topographic prominence of a summit is a measure of how high the summit rises above its surroundings. The second table below ranks the 30 most prominent summits of Oregon.
3. The topographic isolation (or radius of dominance) of a summit measures how far the summit lies from its nearest point of equal elevation. The third table below ranks the 30 most isolated major summits of Oregon.

== Highest major summits ==
Of the highest major summits of Oregon, six peaks exceed 3000 meters (9843 feet) elevation and 28 peaks exceed 2500 meters (8202 feet) elevation.

The 34 highest summits of Oregon with at least 300 meters of topographic prominence
Rank	Mountain peak	Mountain range	Elevation	Prominence	Isolation	Location
1	Mount Hood (Note: The summit of Mount Hood is the highest point of the Oregon Cascades and the U.S. State of Oregon.)	Cascade Range	11,249 ft 3428.8 m	7,706 ft 2349 m	57.3 mi 92.2 km	45.3735°N 121.6959°W
2	Mount Jefferson (Note: The elevation of Mount Jefferson includes an adjustment of +1.388 m (4.55 ft) from NGVD 29 to NAVD 88.)	Cascade Range	10,502 ft 3201 m	5,797 ft 1767 m	48.1 mi 77.5 km	44.6743°N 121.7996°W
3	South Sister	Cascade Range	10,363 ft 3158.5 m	5,593 ft 1705 m	39.4 mi 63.4 km	44.1035°N 121.7693°W
4	North Sister (Note: The elevation of North Sister includes an adjustment of +1.395 m (4.58 ft) from NGVD 29 to NAVD 88.)	Cascade Range	10,090 ft 3075 m	2,745 ft 837 m	4.35 mi 7 km	44.1666°N 121.7723°W
5	Middle Sister (Note: The elevation of Middle Sister includes an adjustment of +1.395 m (4.58 ft) from NGVD 29 to NAVD 88.)	Cascade Range	10,052 ft 3064 m	1,252 ft 382 m	1.12 mi 1.8 km	44.1483°N 121.7840°W
6	Sacajawea Peak (Oregon) (Note: The summit of Sacajawea Peak (Oregon) is the highest point of the Wallowa Mountains and the Columbia Plateau.) (Note: The elevation of Sacajawea Peak (Oregon) includes an adjustment of +1.56 m (5.12 ft) from NGVD 29 to NAVD 88.)	Wallowa Mountains	9,843 ft 3000 m	6,393 ft 1949 m	125.5 mi 202 km	45.2450°N 117.2929°W
7	Steens Mountain (Note: The elevation of Steens Mountain includes an adjustment of +1.496 m (4.91 ft) from NGVD 29 to NAVD 88.)	Steens Mountain	9,738 ft 2968 m	4,383 ft 1336 m	124.7 mi 201 km	42.6364°N 118.5767°W
8	Aneroid Mountain	Wallowa Mountains	9,707 ft 2958.7 m	2,122 ft 647 m	5.89 mi 9.48 km	45.2030°N 117.1750°W
9	Twin Peaks (Note: The elevation of Twin Peaks includes an adjustment of +1.523 m (5 ft) from NGVD 29 to NAVD 88.)	Wallowa Mountains	9,678 ft 2950 m	2,003 ft 610 m	4.84 mi 7.79 km	45.3046°N 117.3452°W
10	Eagle Cap	Wallowa Mountains	9,577 ft 2919 m	1,211 ft 369 m	2.68 mi 4.32 km	45.163695°N 117.301622°W
11	Red Mountain	Wallowa Mountains	9,560 ft 2913.8 m	2,000 ft 610 m	7.36 mi 11.84 km	45.0644°N 117.2460°W
12	Mount McLoughlin (Note: The summit of Mount McLoughlin is the highest point of the southern Oregon Cascades.) (Note: The elevation of Mount McLoughlin includes an adjustment of +1.306 m (4.28 ft) from NGVD 29 to NAVD 88.)	Cascade Range	9,499 ft 2895 m	4,475 ft 1364 m	69.5 mi 111.8 km	42.4445°N 122.3156°W
13	Elkhorn Peak (Note: The elevation of Elkhorn Peak includes an adjustment of +1.456 m (4.78 ft) from NGVD 29 to NAVD 88.)	Wallowa Mountains	9,238 ft 2816 m	1,860 ft 567 m	3.31 mi 5.32 km	45.2223°N 117.3968°W
14	Mount Thielsen	Cascade Range	9,184 ft 2799.4 m	3,362 ft 1025 m	50.4 mi 81.1 km	43.1528°N 122.0665°W
15	Broken Top (Note: The elevation of Broken Top includes an adjustment of +1.369 m (4.49 ft) from NGVD 29 to NAVD 88.)	Cascade Range	9,180 ft 2798 m	2,195 ft 669 m	3.43 mi 5.52 km	44.0830°N 121.6994°W
16	Rock Creek Butte (Note: The elevation of Rock Creek Butte includes an adjustment of +1.389 m (4.56 ft) from NGVD 29 to NAVD 88.)	Elkhorn Mountains	9,111 ft 2777 m	4,476 ft 1364 m	43.4 mi 69.9 km	44.8168°N 118.1039°W
17	Krag Peak	Wallowa Mountains	9,078 ft 2767 m	1,240 ft 378 m	1.32 mi 2.12 km	45.0652516°N 117.2892716°W
18	Mount Bachelor	Cascade Range	9,068 ft 2764 m	2,685 ft 818 m	6.85 mi 11.02 km	43.9794°N 121.6885°W
19	Strawberry Mountain (Note: The summit of Strawberry Mountain is the highest point of the Strawberry Range.)	Strawberry Range	9,042 ft 2756.1 m	4,110 ft 1253 m	46.1 mi 74.2 km	44.3123°N 118.7166°W
20	Needle Point	Wallowa Mountains	9,022 ft 2750 m	1,460 ft 445 m	2.04 mi 3.29 km	45.127418°N 117.352214°W
21	Mount Scott	Cascade Range	8,933 ft 2722.9 m	3,019 ft 920 m	16.07 mi 25.9 km	42.9229°N 122.0162°W
22	Diamond Peak	Cascade Range	8,748 ft 2666.4 m	3,124 ft 952 m	25.7 mi 41.4 km	43.5207°N 122.1496°W
23	Pueblo Mountain (Note: The summit of Pueblo Mountain is the highest point of the Pueblo Mountains.)	Pueblo Mountains	8,639 ft 2633.3 m	3,042 ft 927 m	28.3 mi 45.5 km	42.0995°N 118.6506°W
24	Crane Mountain	Warner Mountains	8,451 ft 2575.8 m	2,356 ft 718 m	44.4 mi 71.4 km	42.0628°N 120.2408°W
25	Drake Peak (Note: The elevation of Drake Peak includes an adjustment of +1.343 m (4.41 ft) from NGVD 29 to NAVD 88.)	Warner Mountains	8,411 ft 2564 m	2,557 ft 779 m	17.44 mi 28.1 km	42.3001°N 120.1238°W
26	Mount Bailey (Note: The summit elevation of Mount Bailey includes a vertical offset of +0.61 m (2 ft) from the station benchmark.)	Cascade Range	8,377 ft 2553.3 m	2,978 ft 908 m	7.76 mi 12.49 km	43.1551°N 122.2200°W
27	Gearhart Mountain	Gearhart Mountain	8,368 ft 2550.6 m	3,440 ft 1049 m	40.8 mi 65.7 km	42.4960°N 120.8773°W
28	Aspen Butte	Cascade Range	8,215 ft 2503.83 m	3,108 ft 947 m	14.7 mi 23.7 km	42.3155°N 122.0876°W
29	Yamsay Mountain	Cascade Volcanic Arc	8,200 ft 2499.3 m	3,181 ft 970 m	33 mi 53.1 km	42.9306°N 121.3607°W
30	Vinegar Hill (Note: The elevation of Vinegar Hill includes an adjustment of +1.365 m (4.48 ft) from NGVD 29 to NAVD 88.)	Greenhorn Mountains	8,144 ft 2482 m	2,900 ft 884 m	14.58 mi 23.5 km	44.7138°N 118.5617°W
31	Pelican Butte	Cascade Range	8,037 ft 2449.8 m	2,196 ft 669 m	9.93 mi 15.98 km	42.5134°N 122.1453°W
32	Lookout Mountain (Note: The elevation of Lookout Mountain includes an adjustment of +1.457 m (4.78 ft) from NGVD 29 to NAVD 88.)	Strawberry Range	8,037 ft 2450 m	2,132 ft 650 m	6.67 mi 10.73 km	44.2889°N 118.4954°W
33	Warner Peak (Note: The summit of Warner Peak is the highest point of Hart Mountain.)	Hart Mountain	8,024 ft 2445.8 m	2,127 ft 648 m	22.1 mi 35.6 km	42.4597°N 119.7414°W
34	Paulina Peak (Note: The summit of Paulina Peak is the highest point of the Paulina Mountains.)	Paulina Mountains	7,989 ft 2435 m	3,219 ft 981 m	28.9 mi 46.5 km	43.6892°N 121.2549°W

== Most prominent summits ==
Of the most prominent summits of Oregon, Mount Hood exceeds 2000 meters (6562 feet) of topographic prominence. Four peaks are ultra-prominent summits with more than 1500 meters (4921 feet) of topographic prominence and 12 peaks exceed 1000 meters (3281 feet) of topographic prominence.

The 30 most topographically prominent summits of Oregon
Rank	Mountain peak	Mountain range	Elevation	Prominence	Isolation	Location
1	Mount Hood	Cascade Range	11,249 ft 3428.8 m	7,706 ft 2349 m	57.3 mi 92.2 km	45.3735°N 121.6959°W
2	Sacajawea Peak (Oregon)	Wallowa Mountains	9,843 ft 3000 m	6,393 ft 1949 m	125.5 mi 202 km	45.2450°N 117.2929°W
3	Mount Jefferson	Cascade Range	10,502 ft 3201 m	5,797 ft 1767 m	48.1 mi 77.5 km	44.6743°N 121.7996°W
4	South Sister	Cascade Range	10,363 ft 3158.5 m	5,593 ft 1705 m	39.4 mi 63.4 km	44.1035°N 121.7693°W
5	Rock Creek Butte (Note: The summit of Rock Creek Butte is the highest point of the Blue Mountains.)	Elkhorn Mountains	9,111 ft 2777 m	4,476 ft 1364 m	43.4 mi 69.9 km	44.8168°N 118.1039°W
6	Mount McLoughlin	Cascade Range	9,499 ft 2895 m	4,475 ft 1364 m	69.5 mi 111.8 km	42.4445°N 122.3156°W
7	Steens Mountain	Steens Mountain	9,738 ft 2968 m	4,383 ft 1336 m	124.7 mi 201 km	42.6364°N 118.5767°W
8	Strawberry Mountain	Strawberry Range	9,042 ft 2756.1 m	4,110 ft 1253 m	46.1 mi 74.2 km	44.3123°N 118.7166°W
9	Brandy Peak (Note: The elevation of Brandy Peak includes an adjustment of +1.157 m (3.8 ft) from NGVD 29 to NAVD 88.)	Klamath Mountains	5,302 ft 1616 m	3,638 ft 1109 m	33.7 mi 54.2 km	42.5976°N 123.8803°W
10	Gearhart Mountain	Gearhart Mountain	8,368 ft 2550.6 m	3,440 ft 1049 m	40.8 mi 65.7 km	42.4960°N 120.8773°W
11	Mount Thielsen	Cascade Range	9,184 ft 2799.4 m	3,362 ft 1025 m	50.4 mi 81.1 km	43.1528°N 122.0665°W
12	Marys Peak	Oregon Coast Range	4,102 ft 1250.2 m	3,357 ft 1023 m	48.6 mi 78.2 km	44.5045°N 123.5523°W
13	Paulina Peak	Paulina Mountains	7,989 ft 2435 m	3,219 ft 981 m	28.9 mi 46.5 km	43.6892°N 121.2549°W
14	Yamsay Mountain	Cascade Volcanic Arc	8,200 ft 2499.3 m	3,181 ft 970 m	33 mi 53.1 km	42.9306°N 121.3607°W
15	Mount Ashland (Note: The summit of Mount Ashland is the highest point of the Siskiyou Mountains.)	Siskiyou Mountains	7,536 ft 2297 m	3,152 ft 961 m	30.4 mi 48.9 km	42.0807°N 122.7169°W
16	Diamond Peak	Cascade Range	8,748 ft 2666.4 m	3,124 ft 952 m	25.7 mi 41.4 km	43.5207°N 122.1496°W
17	Big Lookout Mountain	Blue Mountains	7,126 ft 2172 m	3,110 ft 948 m	16.53 mi 26.6 km	44.6089°N 117.2782°W
18	Aspen Butte	Cascade Range	8,215 ft 2503.83 m	3,108 ft 947 m	14.7 mi 23.7 km	42.3155°N 122.0876°W
19	Black Butte	Cascade Range	6,440 ft 1962.9 m	3,086 ft 941 m	10.81 mi 17.4 km	44.3997°N 121.6355°W
20	Pueblo Mountain	Pueblo Mountains	8,639 ft 2633.3 m	3,042 ft 927 m	28.3 mi 45.5 km	42.0995°N 118.6506°W
21	Rogers Peak (Note: The summit of Rogers Peak is the highest point of the northern Oregon Coast Range.) (Note: The elevation of Rogers Peak includes an adjustment of +1.109 m (3.64 ft) from NGVD 29 to NAVD 88.)	Oregon Coast Range	3,710 ft 1131 m	3,034 ft 925 m	60.8 mi 97.9 km	45.6649°N 123.5481°W
22	Mount Scott	Cascade Range	8,933 ft 2722.9 m	3,019 ft 920 m	16.07 mi 25.9 km	42.9229°N 122.0162°W
23	Mount Bailey	Cascade Range	8,377 ft 2553.3 m	2,978 ft 908 m	7.76 mi 12.49 km	43.1551°N 122.2200°W
24	Vinegar Hill	Blue Mountains	8,144 ft 2482 m	2,900 ft 884 m	14.58 mi 23.5 km	44.7138°N 118.5617°W
25	Laurel Mountain	Oregon Coast Range	3,592 ft 1094.8 m	2,849 ft 868 m	28.2 mi 45.4 km	44.9233°N 123.5732°W
26	North Sister (Note: The elevation of North Sister includes an adjustment of +1.395 m (4.58 ft) from NGVD 29 to NAVD 88.)	Cascade Range	10,090 ft 3075 m	2,745 ft 837 m	4.35 mi 7 km	44.1666°N 121.7723°W
27	Mount Bachelor	Cascade Range	9,068 ft 2764 m	2,685 ft 818 m	6.85 mi 11.02 km	43.9794°N 121.6885°W
28	Pearsoll Peak	Klamath Mountains	5,108 ft 1556.9 m	2,660 ft 811 m	19.34 mi 31.1 km	42.2987°N 123.8464°W
29	Maiden Peak	Cascade Range	7,823 ft 2384.4 m	2,598 ft 792 m	11.81 mi 19.01 km	43.6268°N 121.9648°W
30	Mount Washington (Note: The elevation of Mount Washington includes an adjustment of +1.27 m (4.17 ft) from NGVD 29 to NAVD 88.)	Cascade Range	7,798 ft 2377 m	2,574 ft 785 m	10.15 mi 16.33 km	44.3321°N 121.8385°W

== Most isolated major summits ==
Of the most isolated major summits of Oregon, Sacajawea Peak and Steens Mountain exceed 200 kilometers (124.3 miles) of topographic isolation and Mount McLoughlin exceeds 100 kilometers (62.14 miles) of topographic isolation.

The 30 most topographically isolated summits of Oregon with at least 500 meters of topographic prominence
Rank	Mountain peak	Mountain range	Elevation	Prominence	Isolation	Location
1	Sacajawea Peak (Oregon)	Wallowa Mountains	9,843 ft 3000 m	6,393 ft 1949 m	125.5 mi 202 km	45.2450°N 117.2929°W
2	Steens Mountain	Steens Mountain	9,738 ft 2968 m	4,383 ft 1336 m	124.7 mi 201 km	42.6364°N 118.5767°W
3	Mount McLoughlin	Cascade Range	9,499 ft 2895 m	4,475 ft 1364 m	69.5 mi 111.8 km	42.4445°N 122.3156°W
4	Rogers Peak	Oregon Coast Range	3,710 ft 1131 m	3,034 ft 925 m	60.8 mi 97.9 km	45.6649°N 123.5481°W
5	Mount Hood	Cascade Range	11,249 ft 3428.8 m	7,706 ft 2349 m	57.3 mi 92.2 km	45.3735°N 121.6959°W
6	Mount Thielsen	Cascade Range	9,184 ft 2799.4 m	3,362 ft 1025 m	50.4 mi 81.1 km	43.1528°N 122.0665°W
7	Marys Peak	Oregon Coast Range	4,102 ft 1250.2 m	3,357 ft 1023 m	48.6 mi 78.2 km	44.5045°N 123.5523°W
8	Mount Jefferson	Cascade Range	10,502 ft 3201 m	5,797 ft 1767 m	48.1 mi 77.5 km	44.6743°N 121.7996°W
9	Strawberry Mountain	Strawberry Range	9,042 ft 2756.1 m	4,110 ft 1253 m	46.1 mi 74.2 km	44.3123°N 118.7166°W
10	Lookout Mountain (Note: The summit of Lookout Mountain is the highest point of the Ochoco Mountains.) (Note: The elevation of Lookout Mountain includes an adjustment of +1.285 m (4.22 ft) from NGVD 29 to NAVD 88.)	Ochoco Mountains	6,930 ft 2112 m	2,436 ft 742 m	45.8 mi 73.7 km	44.3270°N 120.3730°W
11	Crane Mountain	Warner Mountains	8,451 ft 2575.8 m	2,356 ft 718 m	44.4 mi 71.4 km	42.0628°N 120.2408°W
12	Rock Creek Butte	Elkhorn Mountains	9,111 ft 2777 m	4,476 ft 1364 m	43.4 mi 69.9 km	44.8168°N 118.1039°W
13	Gearhart Mountain	Gearhart Mountain	8,368 ft 2550.6 m	3,440 ft 1049 m	40.8 mi 65.7 km	42.4960°N 120.8773°W
14	South Sister	Cascade Range	10,363 ft 3158.5 m	5,593 ft 1705 m	39.4 mi 63.4 km	44.1035°N 121.7693°W
15	Brandy Peak	Klamath Mountains	5,302 ft 1616 m	3,638 ft 1109 m	33.7 mi 54.2 km	42.5976°N 123.8803°W
16	Black Mountain (Note: The elevation of Black Mountain includes an adjustment of +1.216 m (3.99 ft) from NGVD 29 to NAVD 88.)	Blue Mountains	6,672 ft 2034 m	1,792 ft 546 m	33 mi 53.1 km	45.2131°N 119.2958°W
17	Yamsay Mountain	Cascade Volcanic Arc	8,200 ft 2499.3 m	3,181 ft 970 m	33 mi 53.1 km	42.9306°N 121.3607°W
18	Mount Ashland	Siskiyou Mountains	7,536 ft 2297 m	3,152 ft 961 m	30.4 mi 48.9 km	42.0807°N 122.7169°W
19	Paulina Peak	Paulina Mountains	7,989 ft 2435 m	3,219 ft 981 m	28.9 mi 46.5 km	43.6892°N 121.2549°W
20	Pueblo Mountain	Pueblo Mountains	8,639 ft 2633.3 m	3,042 ft 927 m	28.3 mi 45.5 km	42.0995°N 118.6506°W
21	Laurel Mountain	Oregon Coast Range	3,592 ft 1094.8 m	2,849 ft 868 m	28.2 mi 45.4 km	44.9233°N 123.5732°W
22	Snow Mountain	Columbia Plateau	7,165 ft 2184 m	2,143 ft 653 m	28 mi 45 km	43.9704°N 119.4962°W
23	Diamond Peak	Cascade Range	8,748 ft 2666.4 m	3,124 ft 952 m	25.7 mi 41.4 km	43.5207°N 122.1496°W
24	Roman Nose Mountain	Oregon Coast Range	2,866 ft 873.41 m	2,110 ft 643 m	25.7 mi 41.4 km	43.9121°N 123.7383°W
25	Warner Peak	Hart Mountain	8,024 ft 2445.8 m	2,127 ft 648 m	22.1 mi 35.6 km	42.4597°N 119.7414°W
26	Cottonwood Mountain	Blue Mountains	6,486 ft 1976.9 m	1,912 ft 583 m	21.8 mi 35.1 km	44.1688°N 117.6621°W
27	Saddle Mountain	Oregon Coast Range	3,288 ft 1002.3 m	2,343 ft 714 m	21.7 mi 34.9 km	45.9691°N 123.6853°W
28	Beatys Butte	Beatys Butte	7,922 ft 2414.6 m	2,055 ft 626 m	21.5 mi 34.7 km	42.3859°N 119.3320°W
29	Bald Mountain	Bald Mountain	7,397 ft 2254.5 m	2,323 ft 708 m	21.5 mi 34.6 km	43.2743°N 121.3555°W
30	Yainax Butte	Yainax Butte	7,230 ft 2203.8 m	2,080 ft 634 m	21.2 mi 34.1 km	42.3262°N 121.2691°W

== Gallery ==
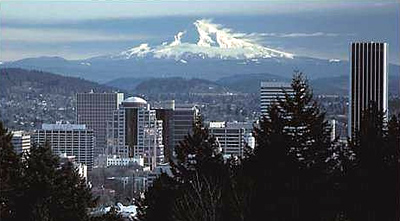
Mount Hood

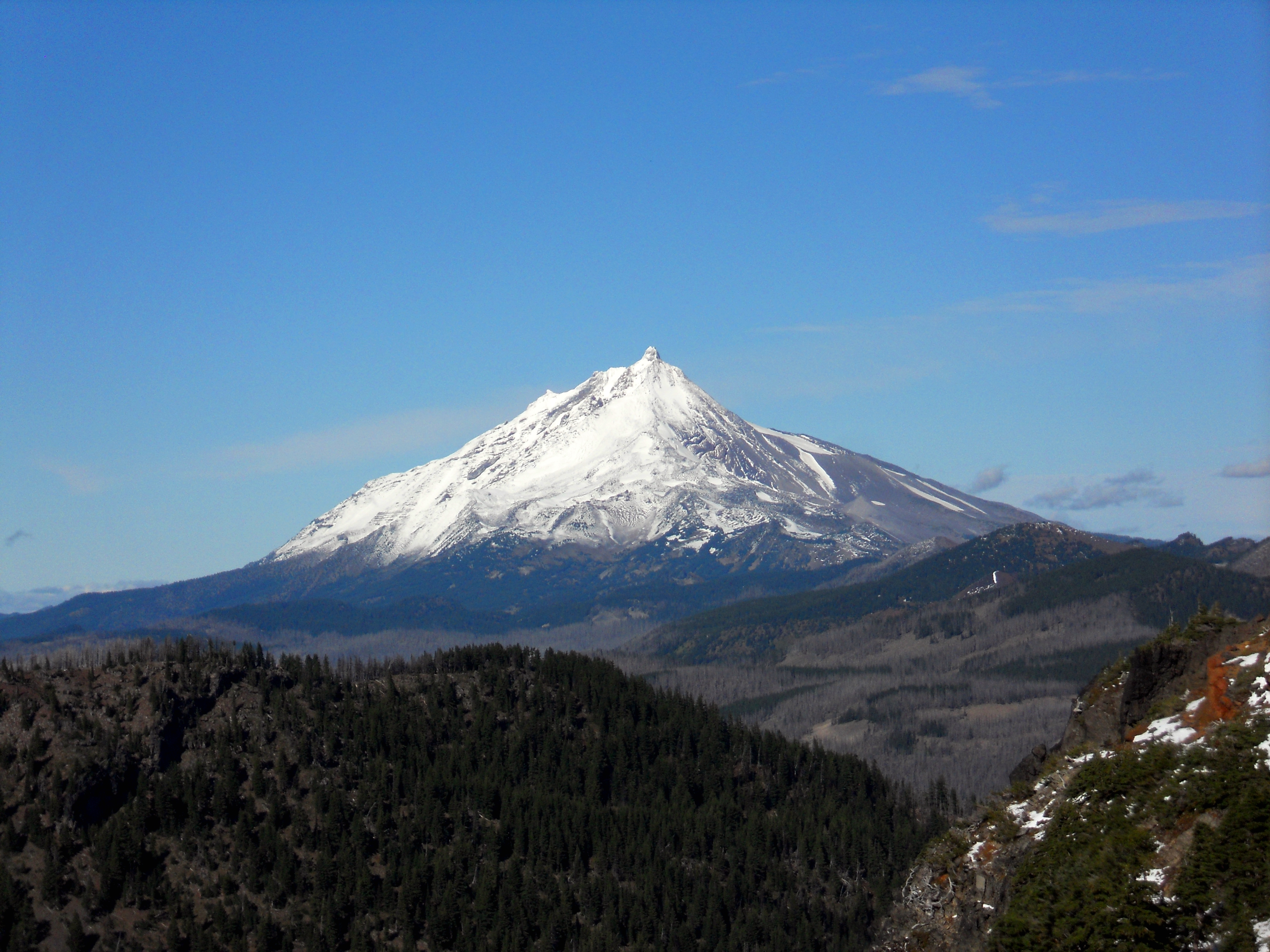
Mount Jefferson

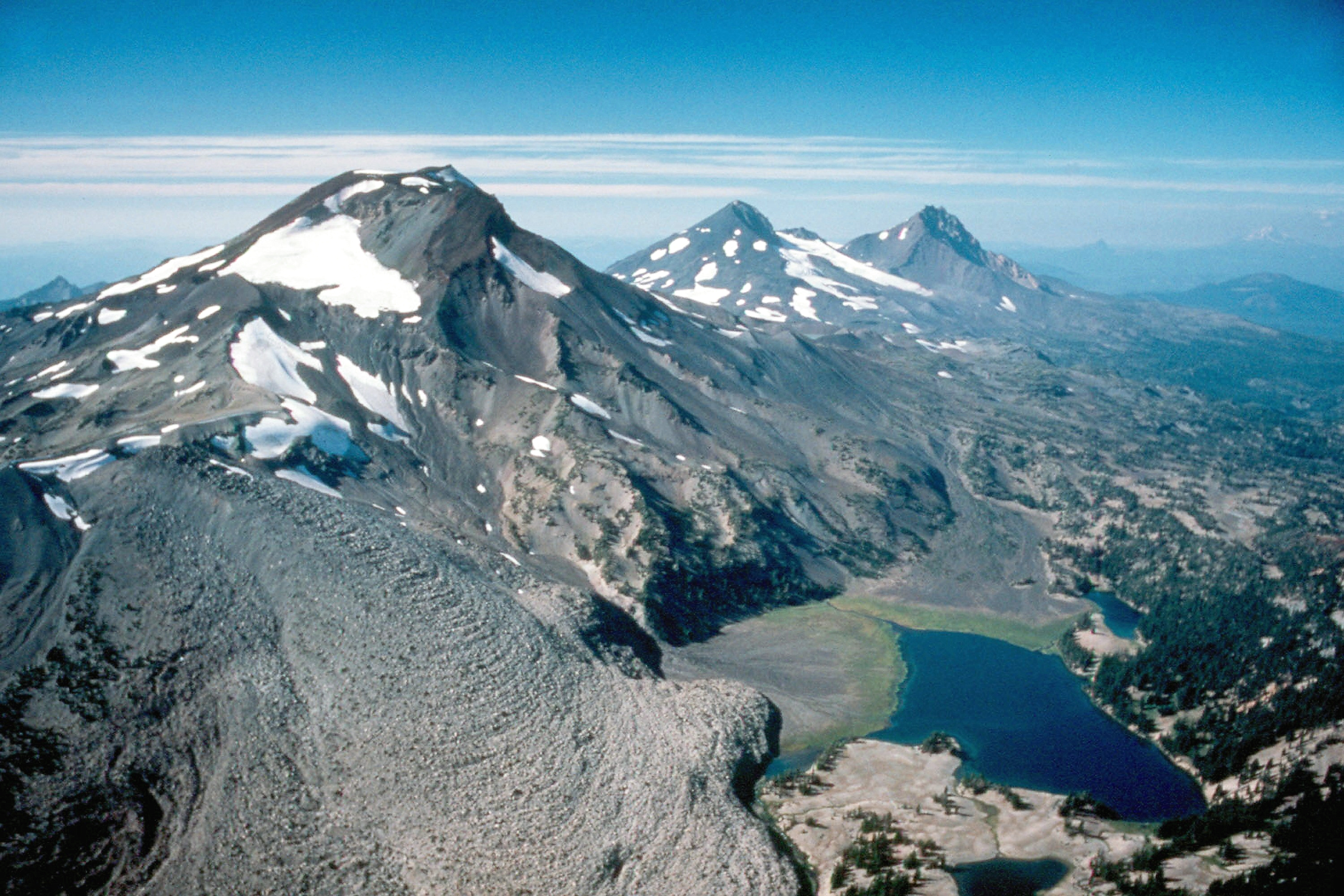
South Sister, Middle Sister, and North Sister

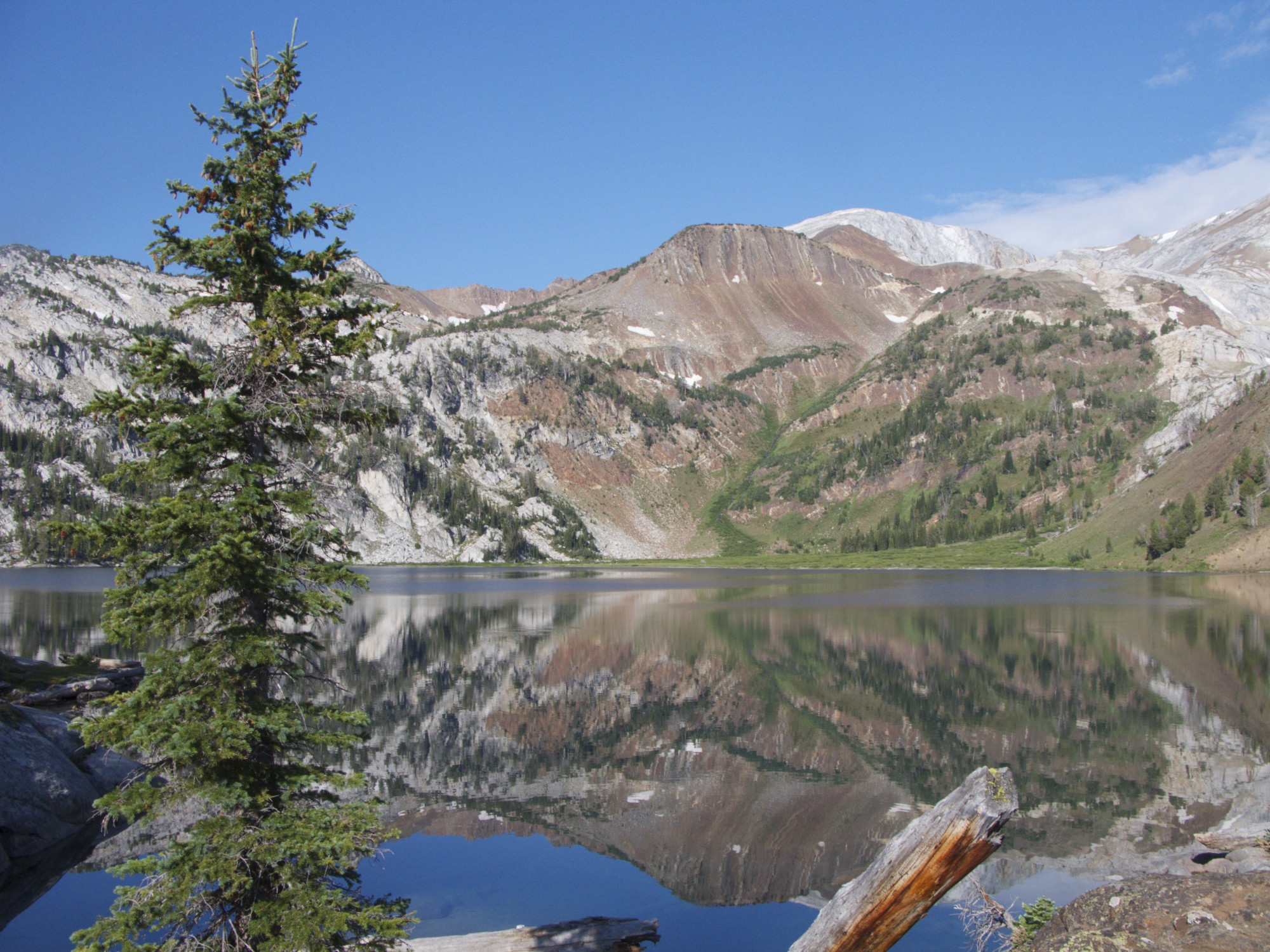
Sacajawea Peak

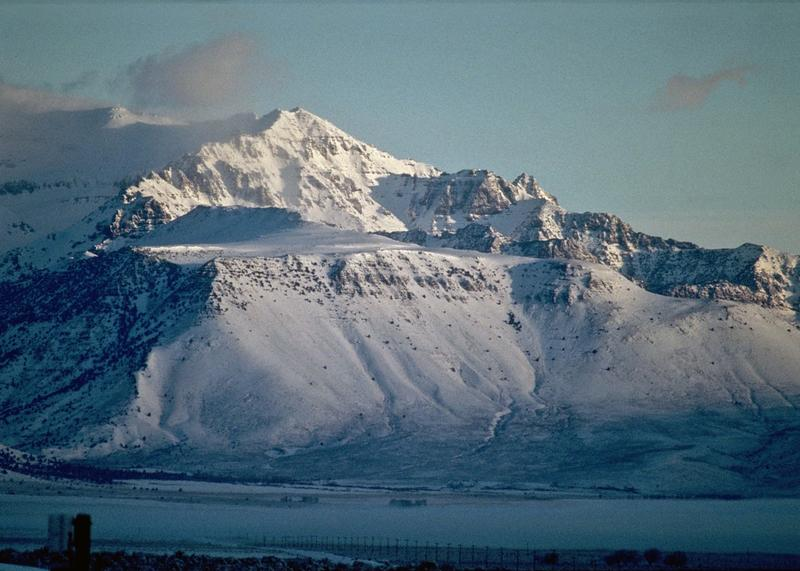
Steens Mountain

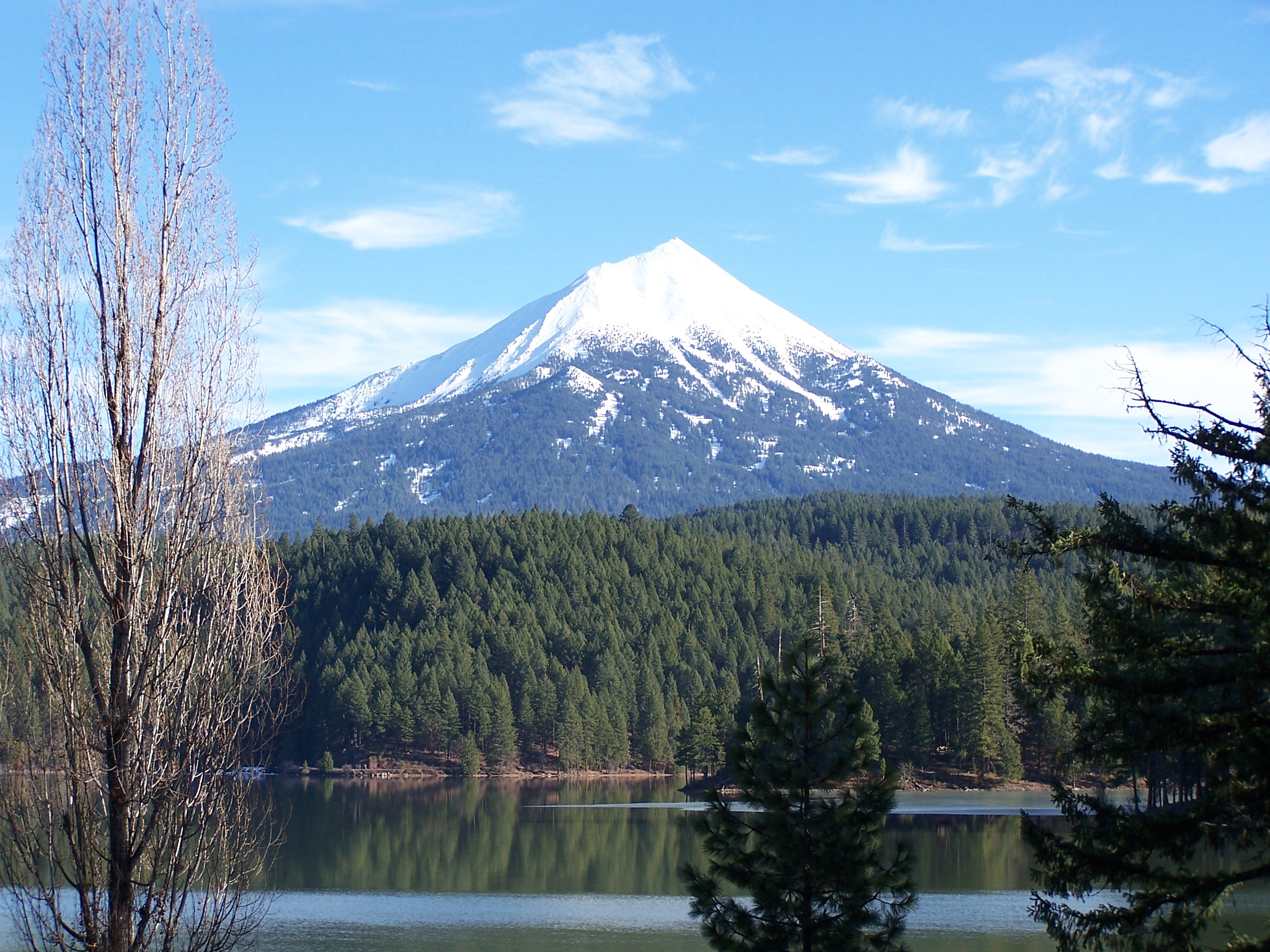
Mount McLoughlin

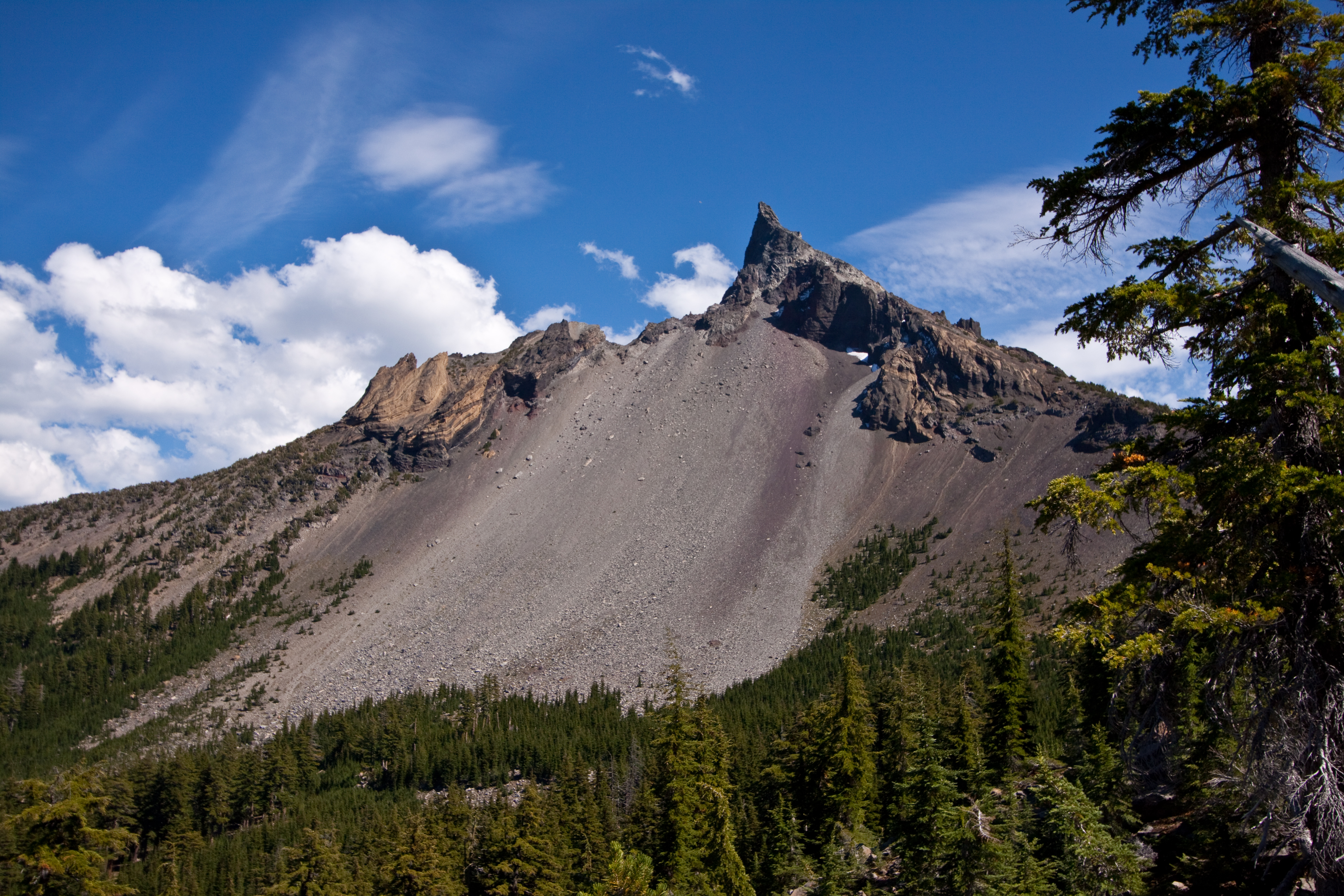
Mount Thielsen

== See also ==
- Outline of the Cascade Range
- List of mountain peaks of North America
  - List of mountain peaks of Greenland
  - List of mountain peaks of Canada
  - List of mountain peaks of the Rocky Mountains
  - List of mountain peaks of the United States
    - List of mountain peaks of Alaska
    - List of mountain peaks of Arizona
    - List of mountain peaks of California
    - List of mountain peaks of Colorado
    - List of mountain peaks of Hawaiʻi
    - List of mountain peaks of Idaho
    - List of mountain peaks of Montana
    - List of mountain peaks of Nevada
    - List of mountain peaks of New Mexico
    - List of mountain peaks of Oregon
      - List of mountains of Oregon
      - List of mountain ranges of Oregon
    - List of mountain peaks of Utah
    - List of mountain peaks of Washington (state)
    - List of mountain peaks of Wyoming
  - List of mountain peaks of México
  - List of mountain peaks of Central America
  - List of mountain peaks of the Caribbean
- Oregon
  - Geography of Oregon
    - Category:Mountains of Oregon
      - commons:Category:Mountains of Oregon
- Physical geography
  - Topography
    - Topographic elevation
    - Topographic prominence
    - Topographic isolation
