= Elkhorn =

Elkhorn or Elk Horn may refer to:

== Places ==
=== Antarctica ===
- Elkhorn Ridge, a ridge of the Convoy Range in Victoria Land

=== Canada ===
- Elkhorn, Manitoba, an unincorporated community
- Elkhorn Mountain, a mountain in British Columbia

=== United States ===
==== Cities and communities ====
- Elkhorn, California, a census-designated place
- Elkhorn, California, former name of Fremont, Yolo County, California
- Elk Horn, Iowa, a city
- Elk Horn, Kentucky, an unincorporated community
- Elkhorn City, Kentucky, a city
- Elkhorn Park, Lexington, Kentucky, a neighborhood
- Elkhorn, Missouri, an unincorporated community
- Elkhorn, Montana, a census-designated place
- Elkhorn, Nebraska, a former city and neighborhood within Omaha
- Elkhorn, West Virginia, an unincorporated community
- Elkhorn, Wisconsin, a city
- Forks of Elkhorn, Kentucky, an unincorporated community
- Elkhorn Township (disambiguation), multiple places

==== Bodies of water ====
- Elk Horn Creek, a stream in Iowa
- Elkhorn Creek (disambiguation), multiple places
- Elkhorn Lake, a lake in Minnesota
- Elkhorn River, a river in Nebraska
- Elkhorn Slough, a tidal slough and estuary on Monterey Bay in California
- Lake Elkhorn, manmade lake in Columbia, Maryland

==== Mountains and formations ====
- Elkhorn Formation, a geologic formation in Ohio
- Elkhorn Hills, a low mountain range in California
- Elkhorn Mountain (Washington), a mountain in Washington
- Elkhorn Mountains, a mountain range in Montana
- Elkhorn Mountains (Oregon), a mountain range in Oregon
- Elkhorn Peak, a summit of the Wallowa Mountains in Oregon

==== Other ====
- Elkhorn National Forest, a former national forest in Montana
- Elkhorn Ranch, a ranch built by Theodore Roosevelt near Medora, North Dakota
- Elkhorn Road, a street in Las Vegas, Nevada
- Elkhorn Tavern, a historic tavern in Pea Ridge, Arkansas
- Fremont, Elkhorn and Missouri Valley Railroad, sometimes called "the Elkhorn", a railroad in Nebraska

== Biology ==
- Euphorbia lactea, plant also called Elkhorn
- Platycerium fern, also known as Elkhorn fern
- Elkhorn coral, Acropora palmata

== Other uses ==
- Elkhorn (sculpture), a work by Lee Kelly in West Haven-Sylvan, Oregon, US
- Elkhorn (TV series), American television drama series
