= Crane Mountain =

Mountain in Oregon

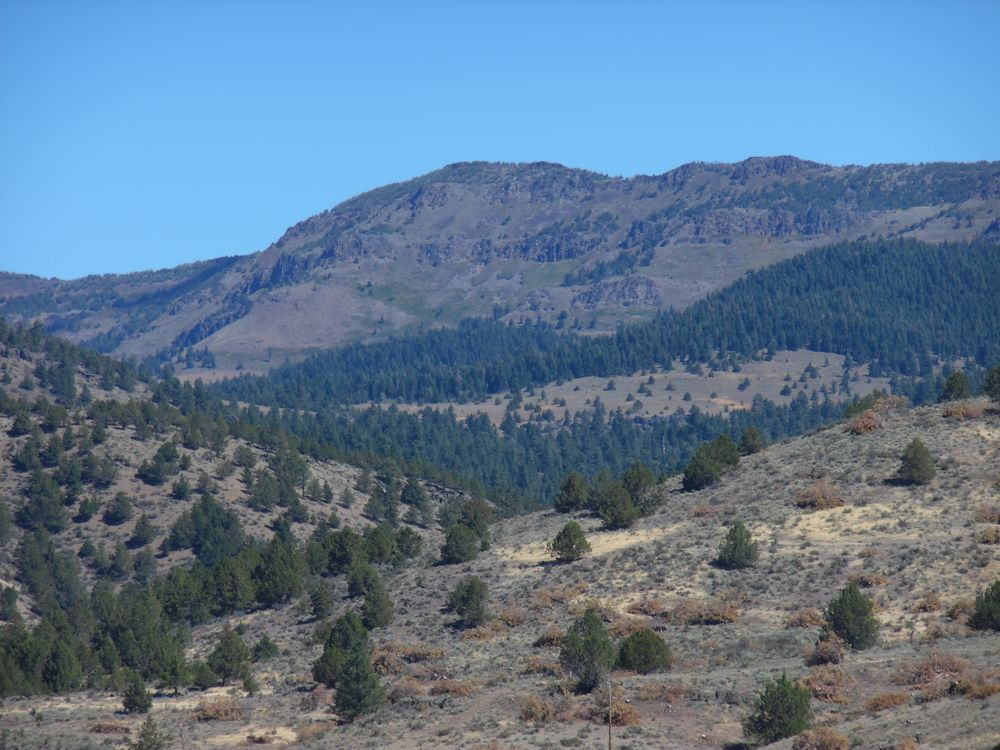
- West face of Crane Mountain

Highest point
- Elevation: 8,451 ft (2,576 m) NAVD 88
- Prominence: 2,336 ft (712 m)
- Listing: Oregon county high points
- Coordinates: 42°03′46″N 120°14′27″W

Geography
- Location within Oregon
- Location: Lake County, Oregon, U.S.
- Parent range: Warner Mountains
- Topo map: USGS Crane Mountain

Geology
- Mountain type: Fault block

Climbing
- Easiest route: Steep rough road
- Normal route: Hiking trail

Crane Mountain is in the Warner Mountain range and is the tallest peak in Lake County, Oregon, U.S. It is located southeast of Lakeview in south-central Oregon, near the northwest corner of the Basin and Range Province of the western United States. The mountain is in the Fremont section of the Fremont–Winema National Forest. There was a United States Forest Service fire lookout located near the summit which was removed in 1972. The Crane Mountain National Recreation Trail runs north and south along the crest of the mountain.

== Geography and geology ==
Crane Mountain is a peak near the northern end of the Warner Mountains in south-central Oregon. It is in the northwest corner of the basin and range country of the western United States. The mountain is located in the Fremont–Winema National Forest, approximately 5 miles (8.0 km) southeast of Lakeview. The summit of Crane Mountain is at 8,451 feet (2,576 m). The summit, which has a topographic prominence of 2,336 feet (712 m), is the highest point in Lake County, Oregon.

Crane Mountain is a fault-block geologic structure typical of southeast Oregon's basin and range country. The primary rock that makes up the mountain is basalt. The mountain has a west-facing fault scarp with a steep cliff face overlooking the Goose Lake Valley. The mountain's fault-block displacement tilts layers of basalt upward to expose the underlying John Day rhyolite tuff formation on the western flank of the mountain. Agates and thunder eggs are found in the rhyolite layers. Small amounts of gold bearing quartz are also found on the southern slope of the mountain. This is very unusual for an area dominated by basalt. The soils around the mountain are typical of the area. They are derived primarily from broken-down basalt and tuffaceous materials.

Crane Mountain is near the northern end of the Warner Mountains. The pine and fir forests of the Warner range extend north and south from Crane Mountain. To the west of the mountain is the Goose Lake Valley and to the east is the Warner Valley; both are developed agricultural areas.

The mountain is drained by five permanent creeks. Crane Creek drains the northern slopes of the mountain. The western flank of the mountain is drained by Cogswell Creek and the southwest slope by Kelley Creek. All three of these creeks flow into Goose Lake. The northeast slope is drained by Willow Creek while the east and southeast slopes are drained by Deep Creek. Both of these creeks flow into the Warner Valley, supplying the Warner Lakes system with water.

== Climate ==
During the summer, most days are sunny in the high-desert country around Crane Mountain. Daytime temperatures on the mountain are generally mild, but nights can be quite cool. Crane Mountain is very cold in winter, with snows beginning in November. The mountain's snowpack usually lasts through May. Annual precipitation averages 40 to 65 inches (100 to 170 cm), mostly from snowfall. This is the highest average precipitation in the Klamath Ecological Province, which includes western Lake County and southern Klamath County in south-central Oregon extending south into Siskiyou and Modoc counties in California.

== Environment and ecology ==
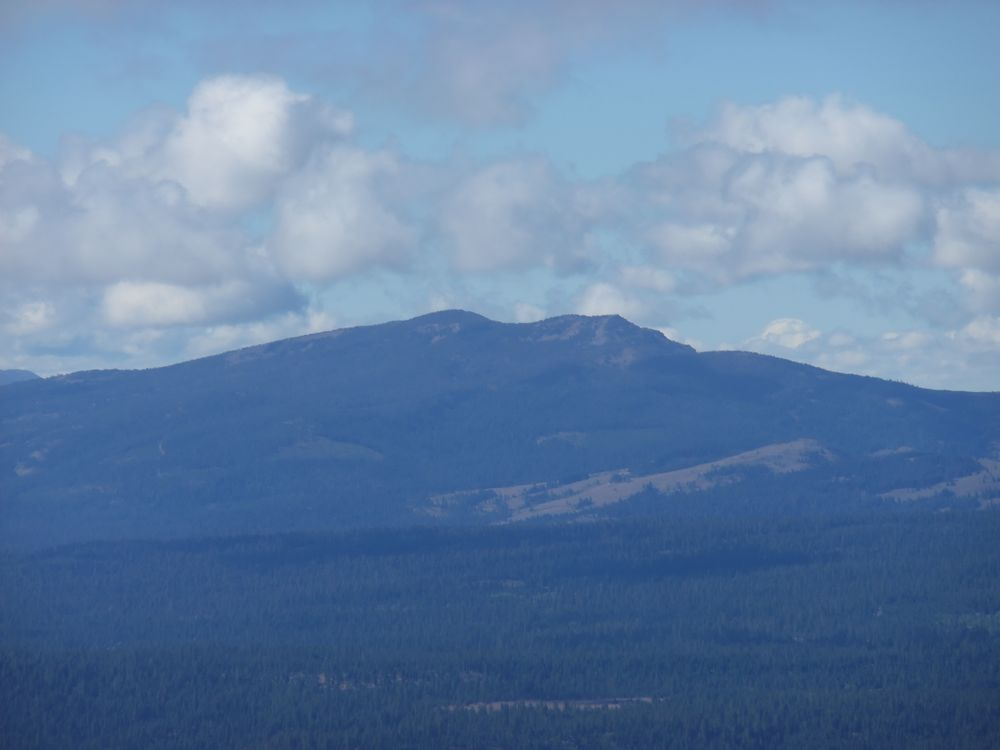
Crane Mountain's forested northern slope

The lower and middle slopes of Crane Mountain are covered by a mixed forest. The lower elevations are dominated with ponderosa pine and some western juniper. At middle elevations, the forest is primarily ponderosa pine and western white pine with Mountain mahogany on the drier slopes. whitebark pine and subalpine fir are dominant at the higher elevations. The understory in most areas is dominated by low sagebrush. The mountain meadows have quaking aspen with wild flowers in the late spring and early summer. Among the most common wild flowers are Indian paintbrush, yellow balsamroots, phacelia, Penstemon, Clarkia, common yarrow, and spreading phlox.

Crane Mountain and the surrounding area host a wide variety of wildlife. Larger mammals found in the area include mule deer, Rocky Mountain elk, coyotes, bobcats, and cougars. Smaller mammals include American badgers, porcupines, striped skunks, black-tailed jackrabbits, white-tailed jackrabbits, pygmy rabbits, golden-mantled ground squirrels, and least chipmunks.

Forest birds common to the Crane Mountain area include pygmy nuthatch, juniper titmouse, mountain chickadee, blue-gray gnatcatcher, Cassin's vireo, plumbeous vireo, American dusky flycatcher, Hammond's flycatcher, olive-sided flycatcher, Vaux's swift, hermit thrush, Bullock's oriole, Woodhouse's scrub jay, Steller's jay, Clark's nutcracker, and black-billed magpie. There are also at least five woodpecker species that live on or near Crane Mountain, including the red-breasted sapsuckers, Williamson's sapsucker, black-backed woodpecker, white-headed woodpecker, and Lewis's woodpecker. Birds of prey found in the area include northern pygmy-owl, northern saw-whet owl, long-eared owl, barn owls, great gray owls, great horned owls, prairie falcon, northern harrier, northern goshawk, red-tailed hawks, turkey vultures, golden eagles, and bald eagles.

== History ==
In the summer of 1867, Archie McIntosh, chief Army scout for Colonel George Crook, led a group 18 of Warm Springs or Shoshone scouts on a reconnaissance patrol from Old Camp Warner south toward the Surprise Valley looking for a Paiute raiding party led by Chief Ocheho. As the patrol moved south, they picked up a fresh trail heading west into the Warner Mountains. As the patrol followed the trail up the east slope of Crane Mountain, the Paiutes ambushed McIntosh and his scouts. One scout was killed early in the fight. After some skirmishing, the Paiutes charged the scouts' position, but were repelled with a loss of three dead and several more wounded. The Paiutes then began to circle around behind the scouts, trying to cut off their escape route. To avoid being trapped, McIntosh ordered the scouts to retreat. As the scouts withdrew, the Paiutes continued to pursue them. One more Paiute warrior was killed during the retreat; however, they continued to harass the scouts all afternoon and throughout the night until the scouts reached Honey Creek, near where New Camp Warner was being built. A few days later, Colonel Crook led 360 soldiers and scouts through the Goose Lake Valley looking for the Paiutes that McIntosh had encountered. Two scouting patrols were sent to reconnoiter Crane Mountain from the west. One of the patrols found a well-built Indian fortification, but it had been abandoned.

After the army drove the native people out of the area, settlers began to populate the Goose Lake Valley west of Crane Mountain. The mountain was named for Samuel Crane, an early pioneer who settled near Goose Lake at the foot of the mountain in 1869. Cogswell Creek was also named for an early pioneer who settled near Goose Lake, just west Crane Mountain.

In 1952, the Forest Service built a fire lookout tower on Crane Mountain along with a small cabin to serve as the lookout's residence. This Crane Mountain lookout was sited a short distance north of the mountain's summit at an elevation of 8,347 feet (2,544 m). It replaced an older lookout located at Willow Point, approximately 1.3 miles (2.1 km) northeast of Crane Mountain summit. The tower was a standard treated timber CT-6 lookout with a 10-foot (3.0 m) elevation. The cabin was a one-room L-4 hip-roof structure with a 14-by-14-foot (4.3 by 4.3 m) footprint. The Willow Point garage was moved to the Crane Mountain site for the lookout's use. The total cost of building the lookout was $2,828. The cabin was renovated in 1963. After two decades of use by the Forest Service, the tower and support structures were demolished in 1972.

== Recreation ==
In the summer, recreation opportunities in the Crane Mountain area include hiking, horseback riding, mountain biking, bird watching, wildlife viewing, camping, and photography. Some trails on the south side of Crane Mountain are also open to off-road vehicles. In the fall, the area around Crane Mountain is known for its excellent deer and elk hunting. In the winter, the western slope from Kelly Creek to Cogswell Creek is available for cross-country skiing and snowshoeing, but it is a very challenging route. Also, weather conditions on the mountain can change rapidly, especially in the winter. As a result, visitors enjoying winter activities need to check weather forecasts before setting out on any of the Crane Mountain trails.

There are three day-hike trails that lead to the summit of Crane Mountain. The Crane Mountain National Recreation Trail reaches the summit from the north and the south while the Crane Mountain Summit Trail comes up the east slope of the mountain. Crane Mountain National Recreation Trail is 31 miles (50 km) long, running from the California border in the south to the point where it links up with the Fremont National Recreation Trail northeast of Lakeview. The trail is rated moderate to difficult, covering terrain that is both steep and rugged. In addition, the higher elevations near the summit of Crane Mountain normally have snow until July. As a result, the trail is lightly used. The Summit Trail begins at a parking area near the junction of forest roads 4011 and 012, 2.2 miles (3.5 km) east of the summit.

From the old lookout site near the summit of Crane Mountain, visitors have an excellent view of the Goose Lake Valley to the west as well as a number of Warner range peaks to the north and south. From the lookout station view point, visitors can see as far south as Mount Shasta and as far west as Mount McLoughlin as well as Drake Peak and Hart Mountain to the north and northeast.

== Access ==
While Crane Mountain is only 10 miles (16 km) southeast of Lakeview, access to the mountain's trail system requires a 37-mile (60 km) drive to reach the trailhead for the summit hike. Much of that trip is on gravel roads. From Lakeview, head north on U.S. Route 395 for 5 miles (8.0 km), then take the exit onto Oregon Route 140. Follow Route 140 for 8 miles (13 km), past Warner Canyon Ski Area. Turn right onto Forest Road 3615, heading south. After 1/2 mile (0.80 km), turn west on Old Highway 140. Continue along the old highway for 1.5 miles (2.4 km), then turn south on Forest Road 3915 when the old highway ends. Follow Road 3915 for approximately 9 miles (14 km) and then turn right on Forest Road 4011. After 2.5 miles (4.0 km) turn onto Forest Road 012, where there is a parking area 1/4 mile (0.40 km) from the turnoff. The Crane Mountain Summit Trail begins there. If one continues on Road 4011 past the Road 012 junction, the road leads to the top of Crane Mountain. However, the road is extremely steep and rough.

== See also ==
- List of mountains of Oregon
