= Elkhorn Township, Nebraska =

Elkhorn Township, Nebraska may refer to:

- Elkhorn Township, Cuming County, Nebraska
- Elkhorn Township, Dodge County, Nebraska

== See also ==
- Elkhorn Township (disambiguation)
