= List of highest points in Oregon by county =

This is a list of highest points in each county in the U.S. state of Oregon, in alphabetical order by county.

All elevations use the North American Vertical Datum of 1988 (NAVD88), the currently accepted vertical control datum for United States, Canada and Mexico. Elevations are from the National Geodetic Survey (NGS) when available. Others are from the United States Geological Survey topographic maps when available. These can be found on the Peakbagger.com web pages. Elevations from the NGS are rounded to the nearest whole number.

County	Name	Height feet / m	Source
Baker	Red Mountain	9,560 / 2,914	NGS
Benton	Marys Peak	4,101 / 1,250	NGS
Clackamas	Mount Hood	11,249 / 3,429	NGS
Clatsop	Saddle Mountain	3,288 / 1,002	NGS
Columbia	Long Mountain	2,269 / 691	PB
Coos	Mount Bolivar	4,321 / 1,317	NGS
Crook	Lookout Mountain	6,930 / 2,112	PB
Curry	Brandy Peak	5,302 / 1,616	PB
Deschutes	South Sister	10,363 / 3,159	NGS
Douglas	Mount Thielsen	9,184 / 2,799	NGS
Gilliam	Gilliam County High Point	4,289 / 1,307	PB
Grant	Strawberry Mountain	9,042 / 2,756	NGS
Harney	Steens Mountain	9,738 / 2,968	PB
Hood River	Mount Hood	11,249 / 3,429	NGS
Jackson	Mount McLoughlin	9,499 / 2,895	PB
Jefferson	Mount Jefferson	10,502 / 3,200	PB
Josephine	Grayback Mountain	7,059 / 2,152	NGS
Klamath	Mount Thielsen	9,184 / 2,799	NGS
Lake	Crane Mountain	8,451 / 2,576	NGS
Lane	South Sister	10,363 / 3,159	NGS
Lincoln	Lincoln County High Point	3,405 / 1,038	PB
Linn	Mount Jefferson	10,502 / 3,200	PB
Malheur	Oregon Canyon Mountains Peak	8,031 / 2,448	NGS
Morrow	Black Mountain	5,936 ft / 1,809	PB
Marion	Mount Jefferson (North Ridge)	9,005 / 2,744	PB
Multnomah	Buck Peak	4,755 / 1,449	PB
Polk	Laurel Mountain	3,592 / 1,095	NGS
Sherman	Sherman County High Point	3004+ / 915+	PB
Tillamook	Rogers Peak	3,710 / 1,131	PB
Umatilla	Tower Mountain	6,855 / 2,089	NGS
Union	Eagle Cap	9,577 / 2,920	PB
Wallowa	Sacajawea Peak	9,843 / 3,001	PB
Wasco	Olallie Butte (Northeast Slope)	6,284 / 1,915	PB
Washington	South Saddle Mountain	3,465 / 1,056	NGS
Wheeler	Spanish Peak	6,876 / 2,096	NGS
Yamhill	Trask Mountain	3,426 / 1,044	NGS
