= Warner Peak =

Mountain in Oregon, United States

- Location within Oregon

Highest point
- Elevation: 8,012 ft (2,442 m)
- Prominence: 2,117 ft (645 m)
- Parent peak: Drake Peak
- Isolation: 22.11 mi (35.58 km)
- Coordinates: 42°27′35″N 119°44′30″W

Geography
- Location: Lake County, Oregon

Warner Peak is an 8,018-foot (2,444 m) summit, the highest point of the Hart Mountain massif in Lake County, Oregon, United States. It is located about 10 miles (16 km) northeast of Plush.

== See also ==
- List of mountain peaks of Oregon
