= Gearhart Mountain =

Mountain in Oregon, United States

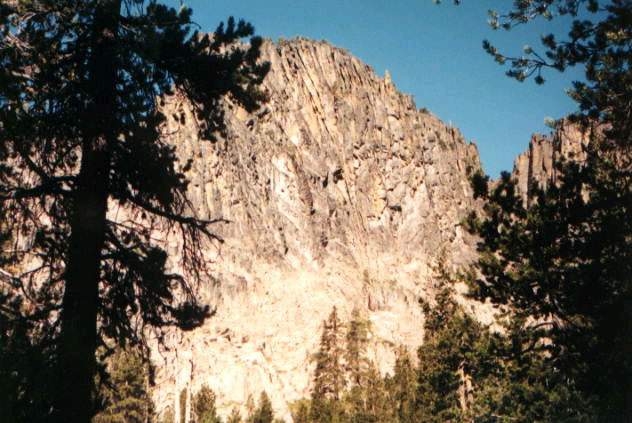
- Gearhart Mountain viewed from wilderness trail

Highest point
- Elevation: 8,364 ft (2,549 m)
- Prominence: 3,430 ft (1,050 m)
- Parent peak: Drake Peak
- Isolation: 40.85 mi (65.74 km)
- Coordinates: 42°29′00″N 120°51′35″W

Geography
- Location within Oregon
- Location: Lake County and Klamath County, Oregon

Geology
- Rock age: Miocene
- Mountain type(s): Stratovolcano, shield volcano
- Last eruption: Miocene

Gearhart Mountain is a 8,364-foot-high (2,549 m) mountain in Lake County and Klamath County, Oregon, in the United States. It is located in the Gearhart Mountain Wilderness of the Fremont–Winema National Forest, northeast of the Sprague River valley and the town of Bly.

== Geology ==
Gearhart Mountain is one of the larger volcanoes in Lake County. It is a Miocene shield volcano and stratovolcano that has been eroded and become extinct.

== See also ==
- List of mountain peaks of Oregon
