= Vinegar Hill =

Vinegar Hill may refer to:

== Elevations ==
- Vinegar Hill (Enniscorthy), a hill above Enniscorthy, County Wexford, Ireland
- Vinegar Hill (New York), a mountain in Greene County
- Vinegar Hill (Oregon), in the Greenhorn Mountains
- Vinegar Hill, a mountain in Beaverhead County, Montana

== Settlements ==
- Vinegar Hill, Brooklyn, a neighborhood in New York City
- Vinegar Hill, New Zealand, a locality and campsite in Manawatu-Wanganui
- Vinegar Hill, Ontario, Canada
- Vinegar Hill, Queensland, Australia
- Vinegar Hill Historic District, Bloomington, Indiana
- Vinegar Hill (Charlottesville, Virginia), a neighborhood
- Vinegar Hill Township, Jo Daviess County, Illinois
- Vinegarhill, a former location in Glasgow, Scotland
- Vinegar Hill, a locality near Magor, Monmouthshire, Wales

== Other uses ==
- Battle of Vinegar Hill, an engagement during the Irish Rebellion of 1798
- Castle Hill convict rebellion of 1804 in Australia, sometimes referred to as the second Battle of Vinegar Hill
- Vinegar Hill (novel), a 1994 novel by A. Manette Ansay
  - Vinegar Hill (film), a 2005 TV movie based on the novel, starring Mary-Louise Parker
