= Gearhart Mountain Wilderness =

Protected natural area in the U.S. state of Oregon

- IUCN category Ib (wilderness area)
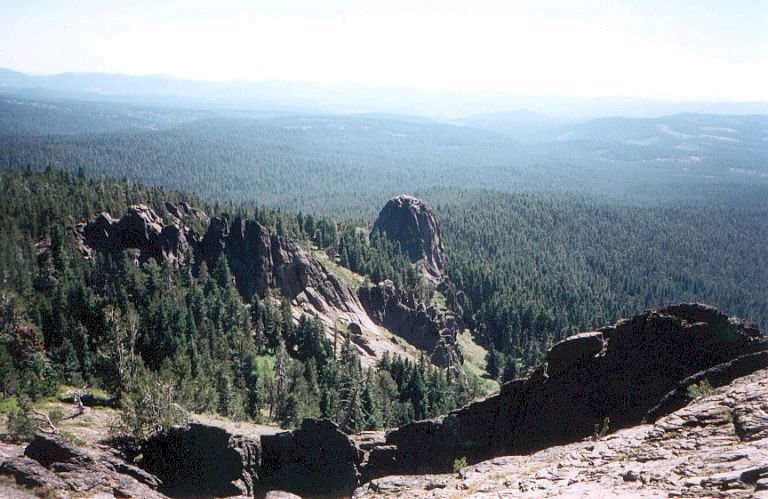
- The Gearhart Mountain Wilderness

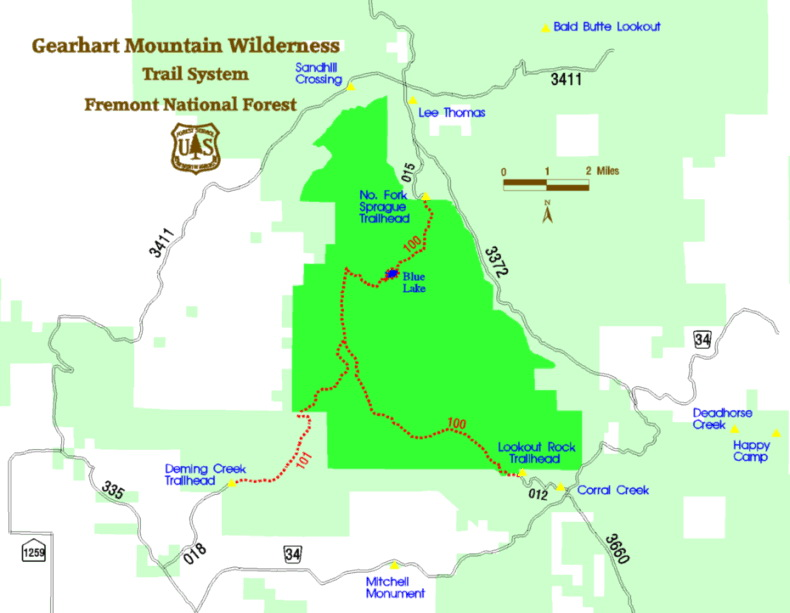
- A map of the wilderness area
- Location: Lake / Klamath counties, Oregon, United States
- Nearest city: Bly, Oregon
- Coordinates: 42°30′46″N 120°51′44″W
- Area: 22,823 acres (9,236 ha)
- Established: 1943
- Governing body: U.S. Forest Service

Gearhart Mountain Wilderness is a wilderness area located within the Fremont–Winema National Forest in Lake and Klamath counties in south-central Oregon. This area was established in 1943 as a Wild Area and designated as wilderness with the Wilderness Act of 1964. In 1984, an additional 4,144 acres (1,677 ha) were added for a total of 22,823 acres (9,236 ha). The wilderness is entirely within the Bly Ranger District.

Gearhart Mountain was named for James P. Gearhart and William H. Gearhart, two brothers who raised and traded cattle in the area from about 1873 to 1882.

== Topography ==
The Gearhart Mountain Wilderness is in the desert/coastal transition zone of south-central Oregon, on the borders of Lake and Klamath counties. At 8,364 feet (2,549 m), Gearhart Mountain is the highest point in this wilderness of high, mountain meadows, cirques, and glacial valleys. Views from the top of Gearhart Mountain range from Steens Mountain to the east, the Cascade peaks to the west, Lassen Peak in California to the south, and the Three Sisters in the north. The headwaters of numerous small streams lie at the base of many of the cliffs and ridges.

== Vegetation ==
The Gearhart Mountain Wilderness is part of a continuous, dry, pine forest covering the transition zone. Differences in species are primarily dependent on water availability. The lower slopes tend to be dominated by white fir with a mix of ponderosa pine and lodgepole pines, while the higher elevations are covered with pure stands of lodgepole and whitebark pine. Minor inclusions of sugar pine and incense-cedar can also be found in scattered locations. The meadows scattered throughout the wilderness are characterized by lush, green ground cover, stands of aspen, and a multitude of wildflowers. Riparian zones support tag alder, willow, and a large diversity of understory flora. The Gearhart Mountain Wilderness does have some stands of old-growth forest. However, in recent years, a large area of the forest on Gearhart Mountain and surrounding areas have succumbed to the mountain pine beetle, and large dead stands of lodgepole pine can be seen.

== Wildlife ==
A variety of wildlife can be found in the Gearhart Mountain Wilderness. These include deer, coyote, elk, black bear, golden-mantled ground squirrel, and mountain lion, and a wide variety of birds, such as several kinds of woodpecker, mountain chickadees, finches, canada and steller's jays, dark-eyed juncos, common ravens, brown creepers, golden-crowned kinglets, red-breasted nuthatches, cassin's vireos, yellow-rumped and hermit warblers, pacific-slope and dusky flycatchers, sooty grouse, clark's nutcrackers, and red-tailed hawks. Bull trout inhabit headwater stream reaches with rainbow and brook trout inhabiting the lower reaches of some of the area streams; Blue Lake is stocked yearly with rainbow trout.

== Recreation ==
Popular recreational activities in the Gearhart Mountain Wilderness include hiking, hunting, camping, swimming, fishing, wildlife watching, and horseback riding. Approximately 20 miles (32 km) of established trails cross the wilderness. There are three main trails, which begin at the wilderness edge and converge just north of the summit of Gearhart Mountain: Deming Creek Trail in the southwest, Lookout Rock Trail in the southeast, and North Fork Sprague Trail from the north.

== See also ==
- List of Oregon Wildernesses
- List of U.S. Wilderness Areas
- List of old growth forests
