= Lookout Mountain (Grant County, Oregon) =

Mountain in Oregon, United States

- Location within Oregon

Highest point
- Elevation: 8,018 ft (2,444 m)
- Prominence: 2,112 ft (644 m)
- Parent peak: Graham Mountain
- Isolation: 6.16 mi (9.91 km)
- Coordinates: 44°17′20″N 118°29′43″W

Geography
- Location: Grant County, Oregon

Lookout Mountain is an 8,018-foot (2,444 m) summit of the Strawberry Range in Grant County, Oregon in the United States. It is located in the Malheur National Forest, about 15 miles (24 km) southeast of Prairie City.

== See also ==
- List of mountain peaks of Oregon
