= Needle Point (Oregon) =

Mountain summit in Union County, Oregon, United States

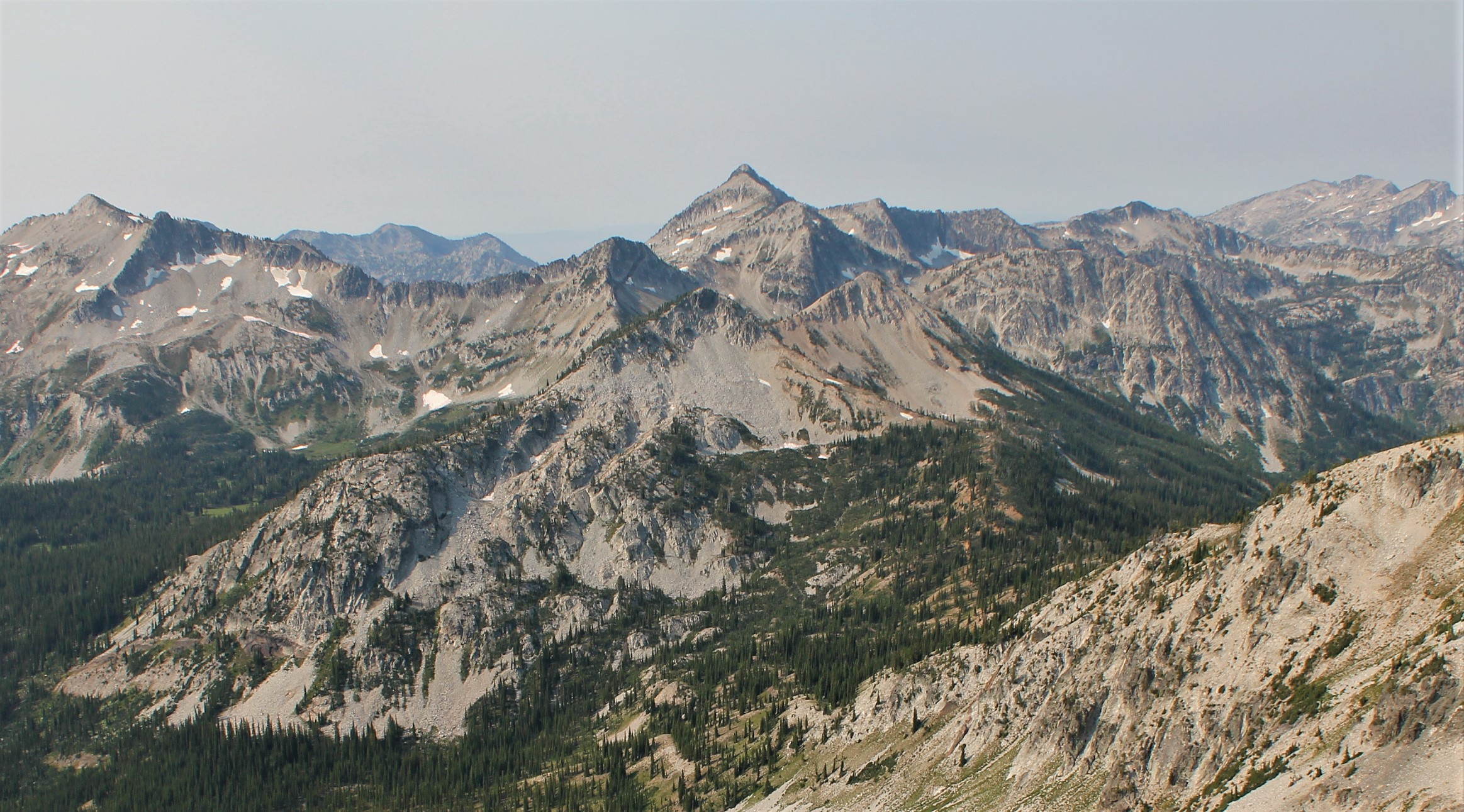
- Northeast aspect, centered at top

Highest point
- Elevation: 9,018 ft (2,749 m)
- Prominence: 1,458 ft (444 m)
- Parent peak: Eagle Cap (9,577 ft)
- Isolation: 3.47 mi (5.58 km)
- Coordinates: 45°07′39″N 117°21′08″W

Geography
- Location within Oregon Location within the United States
- Location: Eagle Cap Wilderness
- Country: United States of America
- State: Oregon
- County: Union
- Parent range: Wallowa Mountains
- Topo map: USGS Eagle Cap

Needle Point is a mountain summit located in Union County, Oregon, US.

== Description ==
Needle Point is located in the Wallowa Mountains and is set within the Eagle Cap Wilderness, on land managed by Wallowa–Whitman National Forest. The remote 9,018-foot elevation (2,749 m) peak ranks as the 50th-highest mountain in Oregon. The peak is situated 3.5 miles southwest of line parent Eagle Cap. Precipitation runoff from the mountain drains north to Minam River via Pop Creek, and south into headwaters of Eagle Creek. Topographic relief is significant as the summit rises 2,600 feet (790 meters) above Eagle Creek in one mile. This landform's toponym has been officially adopted by the United States Board on Geographic Names.

== Climate ==
Based on the Köppen climate classification, Needle Point is located in a subarctic climate zone characterized by long, usually very cold winters, and mild summers. Winter temperatures can drop below −10 °F with wind chill factors below −20 °F. Most precipitation in the area is caused by orographic lift. Thunderstorms are common in the summer.

== See also ==
- List of mountain peaks of Oregon
