= Toby Riddle =

Native American Modoc woman (c. 1848 – 1920)

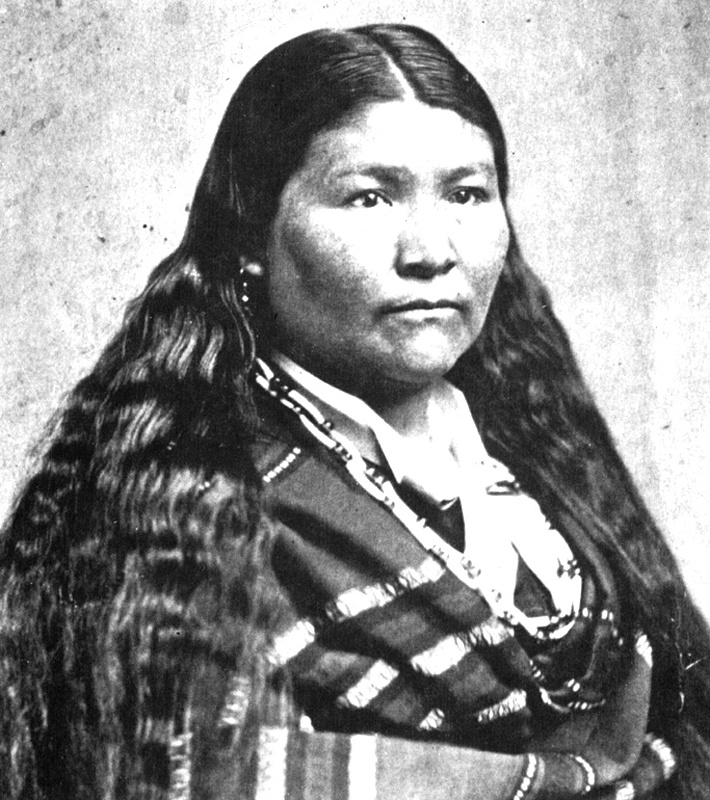

Modoc leader

Personal details
- Born: Nannookdoowah ('strange child') c. 1848
- Died: February 17, 1920
- Spouse: Frank Riddle
- Relations: Kintpuash (second cousin)
- Children: Jeff C. Riddle
- Known for: Interpreter in negotiations between the Modoc tribe and the United States Army during the Modoc War

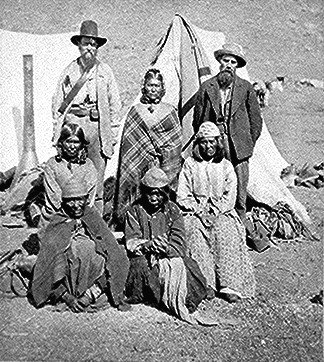
Left to right, standing: US Indian agent, Winema (Toby) and her husband Frank Riddle; other Modoc women in front, 1873

Toby "Winema" Riddle (born Nannookdoowah; c. 1848 – February 17, 1920) was a Modoc woman who served as an interpreter in negotiations between the Native American Modoc tribe and the United States Army during the Modoc War (also called the Lava Beds War). She warned the peace commission of a possible Modoc attack, and she saved the life of the chairman Alfred B. Meacham when the 1873 attack took place.

She and her family toured with Meacham after the war, starring in his lecture-play "Tragedy of the Lava Beds", to inform American people about the war. Meacham later published a book about Winema, which he dedicated to her. In 1891 Toby Riddle was one of the few Native American women to be awarded a military pension by the United States Congress, for her heroic actions during the peace negotiations in 1873. (Her first name also appears spelled as "Tobey" in historical records.)

== Early life and education ==
She was born Nannookdoowah, which means "strange child," as she was born with red-tinted hair. In later years she would be taken to Yreka by her father where she would clean houses and hotels. In her time in Yreka, due to the complexity of her name, the settlers there began to refer to her as "Toby" a common racial slur associated with African American slaves. She would continue to be referred to in American circles as Toby until the conclusion of the Modoc War.

At the conclusion of the Modoc war, Alfred B. Meacham began referring to her as Winema or "Woman Chief" for her role in saving his life during the Peace Commission meeting where General Canby was killed. Nanookdoowah was a cousin of Kintpuash (also known as Captain Jack), the leader of the Modoc tribe at the time of the Modoc War.

== Marriage and family ==
Toby married Frank Riddle, a white settler who had emigrated from Kentucky to California during the California Gold Rush. Riddle rode with the notorious Ben Wright after a failed run as a gold miner. Riddle purchased Nannookdoowah from her father for a complement of horses when she was 13 years of age. They settled near her family in the Lost River area. At age 14, Nannookdoowah gave birth to her only child, Charka ("the handsome one"). Later, Frank Riddle insisted they change his name to Jefferson C. Davis Riddle, in honor of the Army general Jefferson C. Davis who oversaw the end of the Modoc War.

== Interpreters ==
Winema Riddle was one of several Modoc who learned English, and her husband Frank had learned her language. They both served as interpreters before and during negotiations related to the creation of the Klamath Reservation.

They served as interpreters again to the peace commission appointed in 1873 to settle the Modoc War. During the 1873 negotiations, as an American agent Toby Riddle carried messages between General Edward Canby and Kintpuash. After taking a message the Stronghold encouraging surrender, Winema was mocked and run out of the Modoc camp as a traitor. Subsequently, she warned the peace commission, that an attack from the Modoc was imminent.

There are conflicting records on how seriously Canby the warnings of attack. Though the talks were touted as unarmed, Canby wore both his side arm and saber to the talks, and Meacham give conflicting accounts on whether or not other members of the peace commission were armed. Testifying to congress that "we shot back as we fled." implying that he did in fact come armed. Though Canby and Thomas were killed by Modoc, all other members of the Peace Commission escaped. Toby Riddle, abandoned by her husband Frank, stayed near the fight and was credited with saving Alfred B. Meacham from being scalped and killed.

Afterward the US Army, commanded by General Jefferson C. Davis, finally captured Captain Jack and other Modoc leaders. They were tried and convicted before a US military court, and Captain Jack and three others were executed. 153 members of the band were removed as prisoners of war to Indian Territory in present-day Oklahoma. Some other Modoc, including the Riddle family, returned to the Klamath Reservation.

Meacham continued to champion Native American rights. He wrote a lecture-play "Tragedy of the Lava Beds", starring Winema, Frank, and their son Jeff, and toured with them and Klamath representatives across the country for the next two years. They reached New York before returning to make their home in Oregon. Meacham said that Wi-ne-ma was popular with audiences, as she had worked for peace between the peoples. He also published a book about Winema in 1876 and dedicated it to her:

This book is written with the avowed purpose of doing honor to the heroic Wi-ne-ma who at the peril of her life sought to save the ill fated peace commission to the Modoc Indians in 1873. The woman to whom the writer is indebted, under God, for saving his life.

Meacham wrote, the name of

Winema has taken its place beside those of Sara Winnimucca and Sacajawea in the annals of the early west. The personal daring of these Indian Women and the roles they played as negotiators between their people and the palefaces have lifted them above considerations of race into the ranks of the great women of all time.

Because of her heroic role in trying to save the peace commissioners during the 1873 talks, Meacham petitioned Congress to award Riddle a military pension. In 1891 the US Congress authorized a military pension for Toby Riddle of $25 per month, which she received until her death in 1920. Toby and Frank's son Jeff C. Riddle wrote his own account of the Modoc War, to give the Indian perspective, which he published in 1914.

Toby attended the Centennial Exposition of 1876 in Philadelphia, and the Panama–Pacific International Exposition in San Francisco in 1915. In later years, Riddle lived at Yainax Butte, Oregon, on the Klamath Reservation, until her death during the influenza pandemic in 1920. Many of the Riddle descendants continue to live in the area of the Klamath Reservation.

== Legacy and honors ==
- Winema Riddle was one of the few Native American women to be honored by the US Congress authorizing a military pension for her because of her heroism.
- Several regional landmarks are named "Winema" in her honor, including the Winema National Forest.
