= Alfred B. Meacham =

American Methodist minister, reformer, author and historian

Alfred Benjamin Meacham
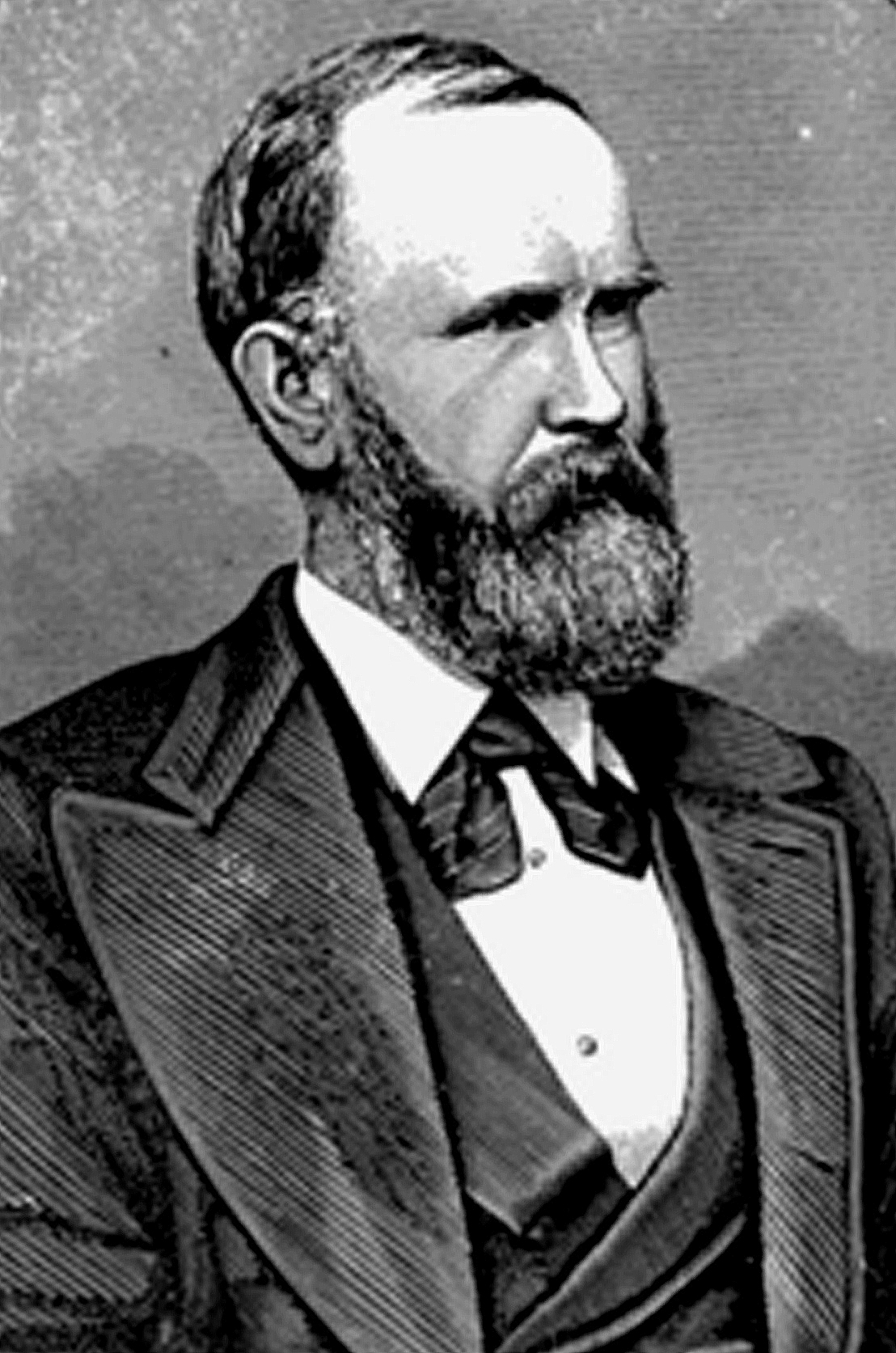
- Alfred B. Meacham
- Born: 29 April 1826; Orange County, Indiana, United States
- Died: 16 February 1882 (aged 55); Washington, D.C., United States
- Occupations: American Methodist minister, Indian agent, author, reformer, Indian Rights activist
- Spouse: Orpha Caroline Ferree
- Children: Clara Belle Meacham, George Ferree Meacham, Elinor "Nellie" Frances Meacham

Alfred Benjamin Meacham (1826–1882) was an American Methodist minister, reformer, author and historian, who served as the U.S. Superintendent of Indian Affairs for Oregon (1869–1872). He became a proponent of American Indian interests in the Northwest, including Northern California. Appointed in 1873 as chairman of the Modoc Peace Commission, he was severely wounded during a surprise attack on April 11 by warriors, but saved from death by Toby Riddle (Winema), a Modoc interpreter.

Meacham continued to work for justice for American Indians. He wrote a lecture-play about the Modoc War, and made a national tour with Modoc and Klamath representatives in 1874–1875. He helped represent American Indian tribes to Washington officials, and testified about relocation issues to Congress. In 1880 he served on the Ute Commission. Meacham published two books about the war. The reformer Wendell Phillips wrote the introduction to the first book, and Meacham dedicated the second and named it for Winema Riddle.

== Early life and education ==
Meacham was born on April 29, 1826, in Orange County, Indiana, where his parents Anderson Meacham and Lucinda Wasson had moved from North Carolina because of their objection to slavery. When he was still a child, the family moved further west to Iowa, where he came to know people of the Sauk and Meskwaki tribes. In Indiana and Iowa he was educated in the common schools.

In 1844, he worked with others hired to assist with the Sauk and Meskwaki removal 100 miles to the west across the Mississippi River, and saw their grief. He realized they would never voluntarily have left "the graves of their fathers."

== Marriage and family ==
Meacham married Orpha Caroline Ferree (1827–1888) in Brighton, Iowa, on October 28, 1852. She had also been born in Indiana. He had returned from working in California to marry her. They traveled together back to the West Coast by way of New Orleans and the Isthmus of Panama. They had three children together: Clara B., b. 1855, who married Dr. J. N. Prather of Iowa; George F., b. 1856, who married Lucia M. Mills of Seattle, Washington, where he moved as an adult; and Nellie Francis, b. 1859, who married Charley Troup (died of tuberculosis) and later Colonel J. W. Redington of Walla Walla, Washington.

== Career ==
As a young man, Meacham went to California in 1850 trying to find gold during the gold rush. After his marriage in Iowa, he returned with his wife Orpha to California, where they lived in Solano County for a time.

In 1863 they went to Washington Territory, east of the Cascade Mountains in eastern Washington, near Walla Walla in the Blue Mountains. He worked at mining and farming. This area was in present-day northeast Oregon. The future Umatilla Indian Reservation was established near present-day Meacham.

Meacham became a prominent figure in Oregon politics; its delegation supported him for Superintendent of Indian Affairs in Oregon in 1866. At the time, Andrew Johnson was president, and his administration learned that Meacham did not support him. His nomination to office was not supported.

He supported Ulysses S. Grant in the presidential election of 1868. Under Grant's Peace Policy (also called the Quaker Policy) to appoint clergy rather than military to administer U.S. Indian affairs, Meacham was appointed in 1869 as U.S. Superintendent of Indian Affairs for Oregon. He was instrumental in trying to bring peace to the Klamath Reservation, where the Modoc had been relocated. They complained of harassment by their traditional enemies, the Klamath.

A Modoc band left the reservation to return to Northern California and their traditional territory. Meacham recognized their problems with the Klamath and recommended to the Commission of Indian Affairs (CIA) that a sub-agency be set up for them at the southern border at Yainax. The Department of Interior never acted on his recommendation, and the problems increased.

Many settlers continued to complain about the Modoc, who did more raiding during the winter because the U.S. government did not provide them with adequate supplies. In early 1872, during the crisis, T.B. Odeneal was appointed as U.S. Superintendent of Indian Affairs in Oregon, replacing Meacham. He "knew almost nothing of the background of the situation and had never met Jack or the Modocs" but was charged with "getting the Modocs to leave Lost River." In turn, Odeneal appointed a new U.S. Indian agent, who was also unfamiliar with the parties and conditions. They turned to military solutions, trying to force the Modoc back to Oregon, and the Modoc War started in 1872.

In the spring of 1873, Meacham was drawn back into the conflict when he was appointed as chairman of the Modoc Peace Commission to try to end the Modoc War. The government believed his knowledge of Captain Jack would be useful, but Meacham refused to participate unless assured that Odeneal would not be on the commission. He was distressed that the issues with the Modoc had resulted in war. Although severely injured in 1873 when Modoc warriors attacked the peace commissioners, Meacham was saved from being killed by Winema (Toby) Riddle, a bilingual Modoc woman who served as a U.S. interpreter. She yelled that soldiers were coming and interrupted the warriors, who fled. Meacham recovered and continued to work to improve conditions for the Modoc and other American Indians.,

== Working for Indian justice ==
Meacham wrote a lecture-play, The Tragedy of the Lava Beds, about the war. He arranged a national speaking tour for Winema and her husband Frank Riddle (who took their son Charka with them), as well as other Modoc and Klamath tribal representatives. He wanted to inform Americans about the issues related to the Modoc War and Indian relocation in general. In 1874, Meacham and the delegation spoke before a group organized by the social activist and reformer Wendell Phillips. In 1875, the delegation addressed Alfred Henry Love's Universal Peace Union in Philadelphia and a meeting of Peter Cooper's U.S. Indian Commission in New York City.

In 1879, Meacham brought Chief Joseph and other Nez Perce to Washington, D.C., to speak to government officials. During the administration of Rutherford B. Hayes, Meacham served on the 1880 Ute Commission with George W. Manypenny, a former Commissioner of Indian Affairs, and the railroad executive Otto Mears to plan and oversee the relocation of the Colorado Ute tribe, led by Chief Ouray, to a new reservation in Utah.

In addition to public lectures, Meacham reported on Native American issues by publishing a journal called The Council Fire and Arbitrator, with Dr. Thomas Bland in 1878. He also wrote two books dealing with the Modoc War: Wigwam and Warpath; or, The Royal Chief in Chains, a history of the War, was published in 1875 with an introduction by Wendell Phillips. The former abolitionist wrote,

To show the folly of our method, examine the south of the Great Lakes, and you will find in every 30 miles from Plymouth to Omaha the scene of an Indian massacre. And since 1789 we have spent about one thousand million of dollars in dealing with the Indian. Meanwhile, under British rule, on the north side of these same lakes, there has been no Indian outbreak, worth naming for a hundred years, and hardly one hundred thousand dollars have been spent directly on the Indians of Canada. What is the solution to this astounding riddle? This, and none other. England gathers her Indian tribes as ordinary citizens, within the girth of her usual laws.... With us martial law, or no law at all, is their portion; no civil rights, no right to property that a white man is bound to respect...

Meacham published Wi-ne-ma (The Woman-Chief) and Her People in 1876 and dedicated it to Toby Riddle, who had saved his life.

This book is written with the avowed purpose of doing honor to the heroic Wi-ne-ma who at the peril of her life sought to save the ill fated peace commission to the Modoc Indians in 1873. The woman to whom the writer is indebted, under God, for saving his life.

Meacham petitioned Congress for years to award a military pension to Winema Riddle for her heroism; in 1891 Congress finally approved the pension, one of the few enacted for a woman and a Native American.

== Lecture-play ==
- Tragedy of the Lava Beds (1874)

== Books ==
- Wendell Phillips, "Introduction", Wigwam and Warpath; or, The Royal Chief in Chains, Boston: John P. Dale & Co., (1875), at Internet Archive, full online text
- Wi-ne-ma (The Woman-Chief) and Her People, Hartford: American Publishing Company, 1876, at Internet Archive, full online text
