= Elkhorn Creek =

Elkhorn Creek or Elk Horn Creek may refer to:

- Elkhorn Creek (Whitewater River tributary), a stream in Indiana and Ohio
- Elk Horn Creek, a stream in Iowa
- Elkhorn Creek (Kentucky), a stream in Franklin County
- Elkhorn Creek (McDonald County, Missouri), a stream
- Elkhorn Creek (Nodaway River tributary), a stream in Missouri
- Elkhorn Creek (West Fork Cuivre River tributary), a stream in Missouri
- Elkhorn Creek (Marion County, Oregon), a stream
- Elkhorn Creek (Banister River tributary), a stream in Halifax and Pittsylvania Counties, Virginia
- Elkhorn Creek (Tug Fork tributary), a stream in West Virginia
