= Greenhorn, Oregon =

- City
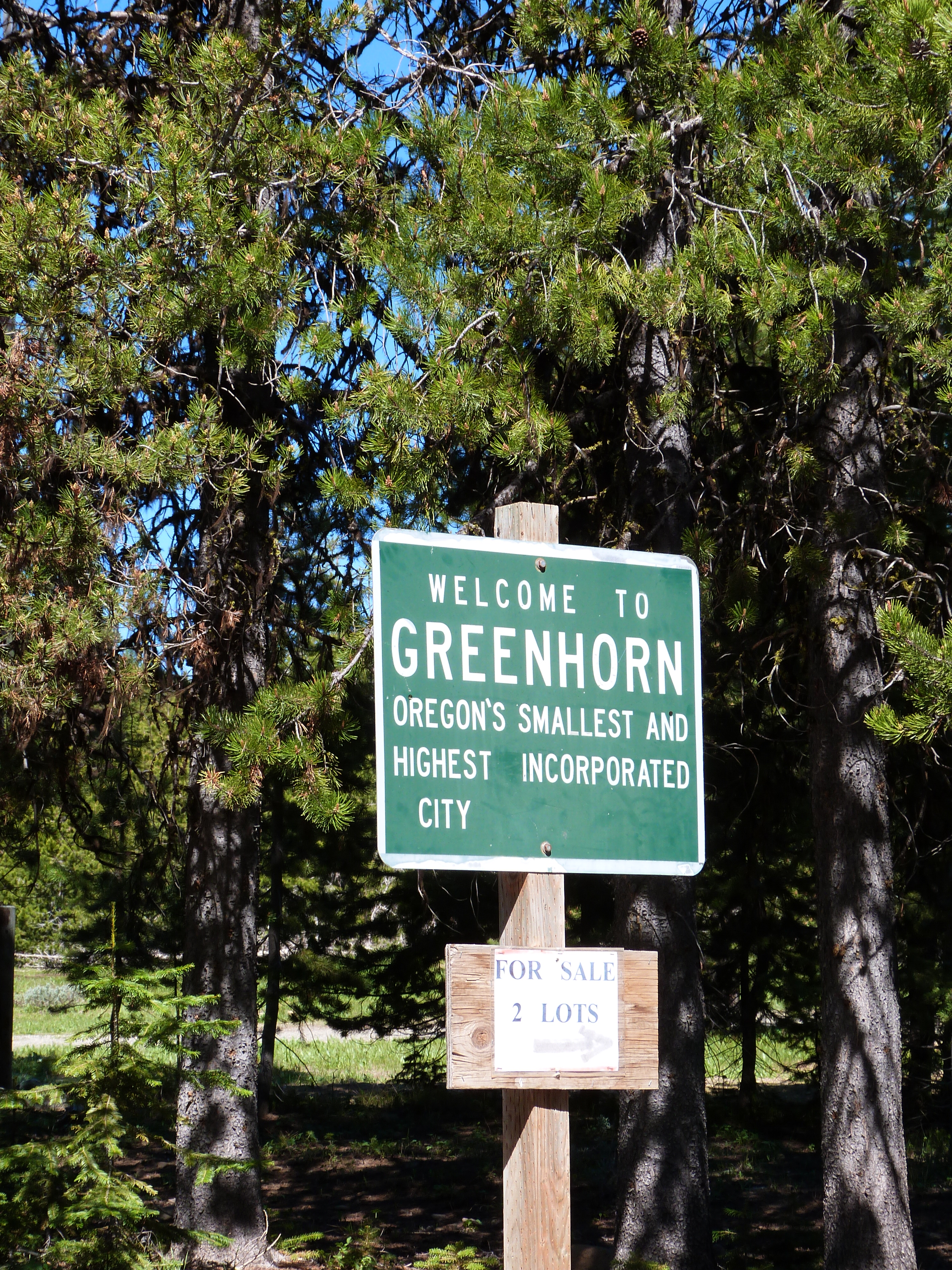

- Location in Oregon
- Coordinates: 44°42′31″N 118°29′48″W
- Country: United States
- State: Oregon
- Counties: Baker, Grant
- Incorporated: 1903

Government
  - Mayor: Dennis Koellermeier

Area
  - Total: 0.085 sq mi (0.22 km^{2})
  - Land: 0.085 sq mi (0.22 km^{2})
  - Water: 0 sq mi (0.00 km^{2})
- Elevation: 6,296 ft (1,919 m)

Population (2020)
  - Total: 3
  - Density: 34.9/sq mi (13.47/km^{2})
- Time zone: UTC-8 (Pacific)
  - Summer (DST): UTC-7 (Pacific)
- ZIP code: 97877
- Area codes: 458 and 541
- FIPS code: 41-31050
- GNIS feature ID: 2410658

Greenhorn is a nearly unpopulated city in Baker and Grant counties in the U.S. state of Oregon. It straddles the Blue Mountain ridge, so that it is located in both Grant County and Baker County. As most of the city is situated in Baker County, and the early residents considered Baker City to be more convenient, for administrative purposes it is considered to be in Baker County.

As of the 2000 census, the city had a total population of 0, with 7 housing units. As of the 2010 census, the population was 0, with 10 housing units. The population had increased to 3 by 2020.

== History ==
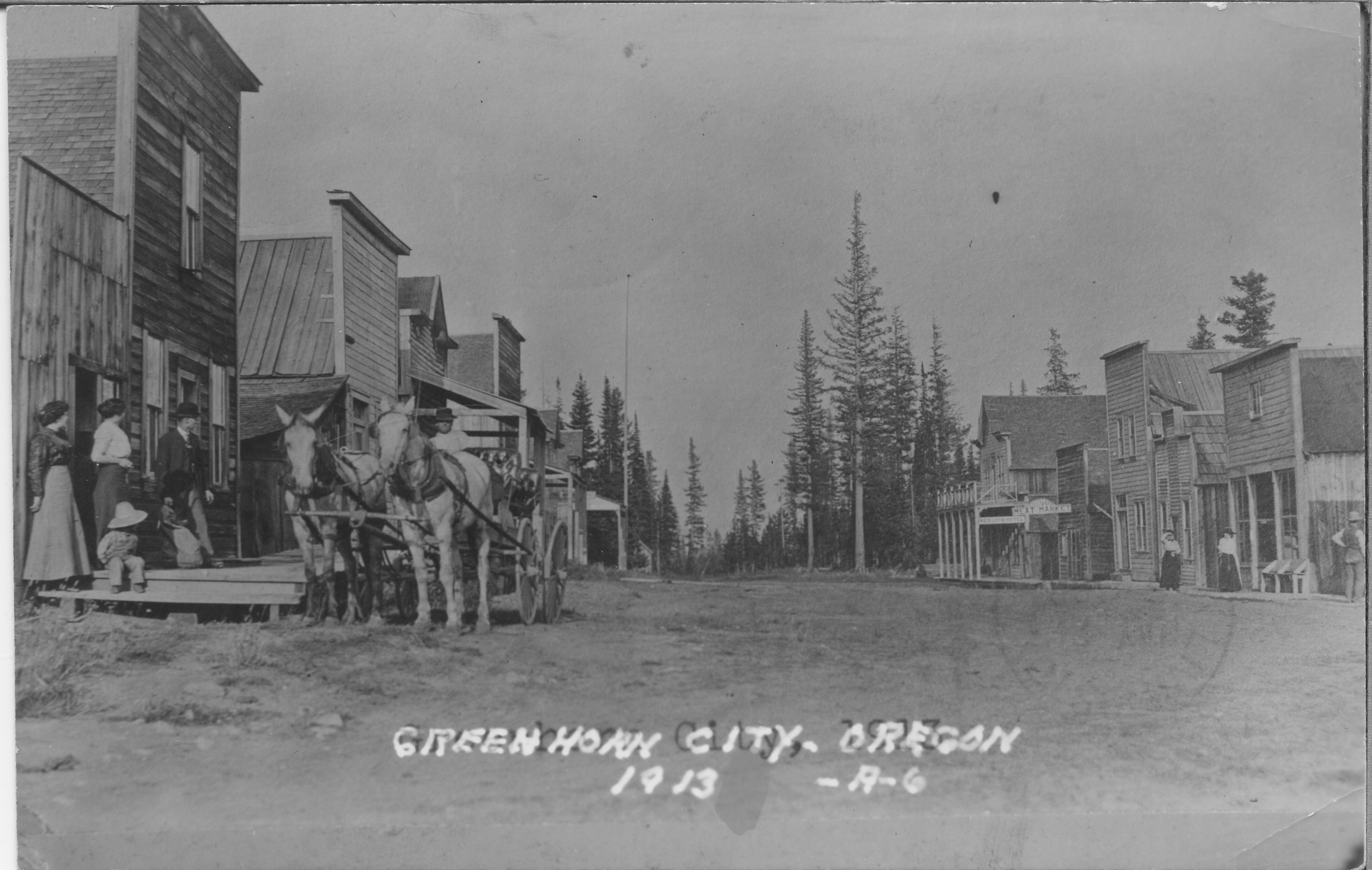
Greenhorn in 1913

Greenhorn was first populated in the 1860s as miners prospected for gold in the area. It was platted in 1904, though it lost two-thirds of its population between 1900 and 1910. The mining district was composed first of placer mines, but soon many lode gold mines developed. The city was incorporated in 1903 and had a population of 28 in 1910. It continued as a viable community until 1942 when gold mining was made illegal by Federal Public Law 208 during World War II.

In later years, the old Greenhorn Jail (dating to around 1910) was removed to Canyon City under suspicious circumstances. A court case ensued for its return, but because the city straddles the Blue Mountain ridge, the district attorneys of Baker County and Grant County could not even agree in which court house it should be held. The case was eventually heard by the Circuit Court for Grant County in Canyon City, Oregon. The jail remains in Canyon City, Oregon.

== Geography ==
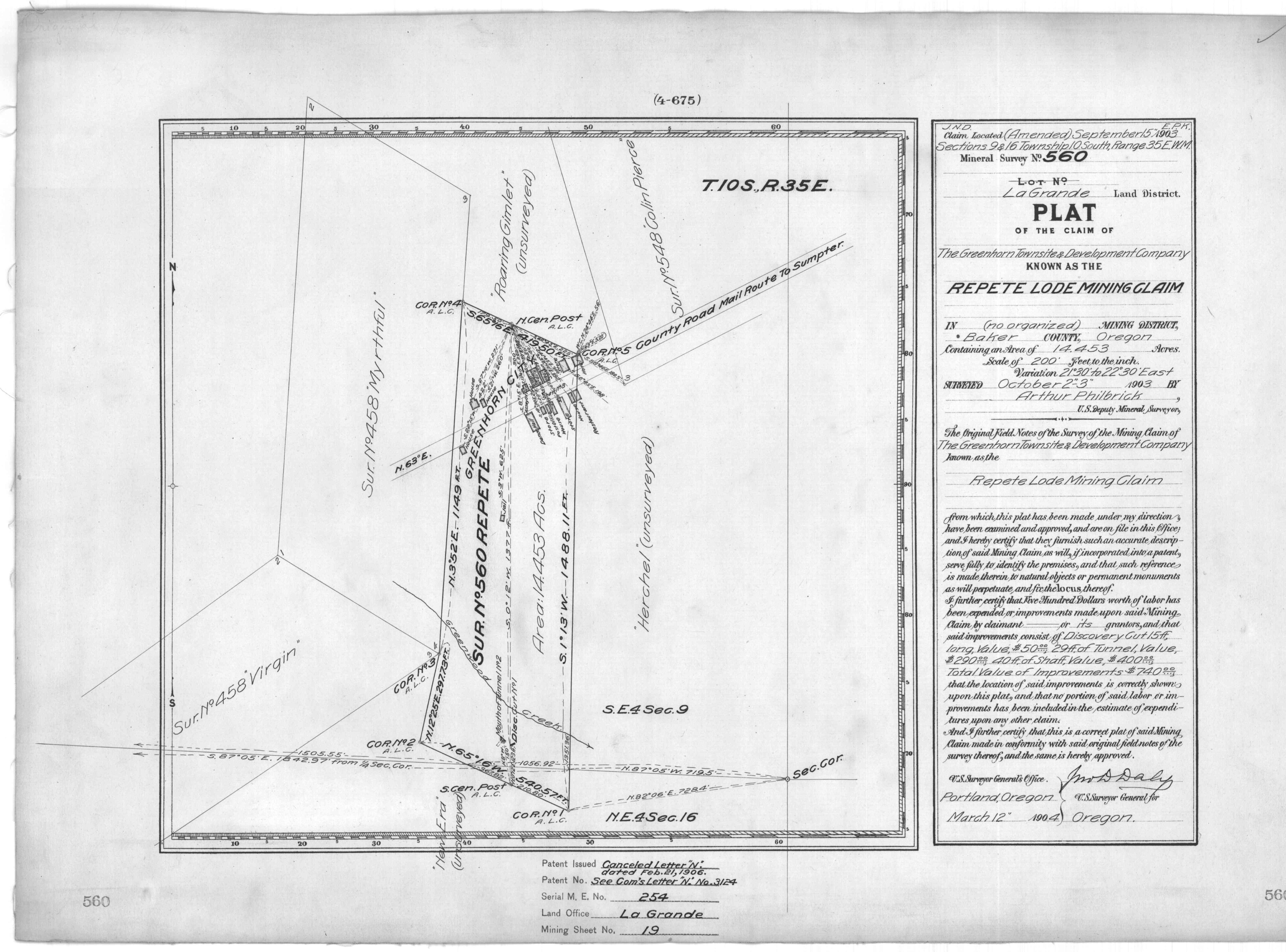
1903 town site plat

According to the United States Census Bureau, the city has a total area of 0.1 square miles (0.26 km^{2}), all land.

The city is in the Greenhorn Mountains, a small range within the broader Blue Mountains, and is surrounded by the Malheur National Forest and Wallowa–Whitman National Forest.

At 6,296 feet (1,919 m) above sea level, Greenhorn is the highest incorporated city in Oregon. It is also unique in that the city was established on land that was originally patented from the United States for the purpose of platting the city (rather than being homesteaded by individuals). (See Town of Greenhorn v. Baker County, 596 F2D 349.)

== Demographics ==
Historical population
Census	Pop.	Note	%±
2020	3		—
U.S. Decennial Census

As of 2013, the Baker City Herald reported that Greenhorn had two "year-round" residents. The Herald reported at that time that the community had about 13 cabins and 20 part-time residents.

=== 2020 census ===
As of the 2020 census, Greenhorn had a population of 3. The median age was 31.5 years. 33.3% of residents were under the age of 18 and 33.3% of residents were 65 years of age or older. For every 100 females there were 50.0 males, and for every 100 females age 18 and over there were 0.0 males age 18 and over.

0.0% of residents lived in urban areas, while 100.0% lived in rural areas.

Greenhorn had 1 household, and it included children under the age of 18. The household was a married couple. There were no households headed by a single male or single female householder. There were no one-person households, including anyone living alone who was 65 years of age or older.

There were 3 housing units, and 2 were vacant (66.7%). The single occupied housing unit was owner-occupied. There were no renter-occupied units. The homeowner vacancy rate was 0.0% and the rental vacancy rate was 0.0%.

Racial composition as of the 2020 census
Race	Number	Percent
White	1	33.3%
Black or African American	0	0.0%
American Indian and Alaska Native	0	0.0%
Asian	1	33.3%
Native Hawaiian and Other Pacific Islander	0	0.0%
Some other race	0	0.0%
Two or more races	1	33.3%
Hispanic or Latino (of any race)	3	100.0%

=== 2010 census ===
As of the census of 2010, there were no people living in the city.

=== 2000 census ===
As of the census of 2000, there were no people living in the city.

== Government ==
As of 2015, Zack Koellermeier and Brad Poyser of Oregon City, Nathan Wright of La Grande, and Keith Rofinot of Tigard serve on the city council. Mayor Dale McLouth lives in Molalla.

== See also ==
- List of ghost towns in Oregon
