= Vinegar Hill (Oregon) =

- Location within Oregon

Highest point
- Elevation: 8,131 ft (2,478 m)
- Isolation: 14.37 mi (23.13 km)
- Coordinates: 44°42′50″N 118°33′40″W

Geography
- Location: Grant County, Oregon

Vinegar Hill is an 8,131-foot (2,478 m) summit of the Greenhorn Mountains in Grant County, Oregon in the United States. It is located in the North Fork John Day Wilderness of the Umatilla National Forest.

== See also ==
- List of mountain peaks of Oregon
