= Elkhorn Peak =

Mountain in Oregon, US

- Location within Oregon

Highest point
- Elevation: 9,238 ft (2,816 m)
- Prominence: 1,860 ft (570 m)
- Isolation: 3.27 mi (5.26 km)
- Coordinates: 45°13′20″N 117°23′38″W

Geography
- Location: Wallowa County, Oregon

Elkhorn Peak is an 9,238-foot (2,816 m) summit of the Wallowa Mountains in Wallowa County, Oregon in the United States. It is located in the Eagle Cap Wilderness of the Wallowa National Forest.

== See also ==
- List of mountain peaks of Oregon
