= Elkhorn Creek (Whitewater River tributary) =

Stream in Indiana and Ohio, U.S.

Coordinates: 39°45′50″N 84°56′13″W

Elkhorn Creek is a stream in Wayne County, Indiana and Preble County, Ohio, in the United States. It is a tributary of the East Fork Whitewater River.

Elkhorn Creek was so named because it was thought its course resembled antlers.

== See also ==
- List of rivers of Indiana
- List of rivers of Ohio
