= Elkhorn Township =

Elkhorn Township may refer to the following townships in the United States:

- Elkhorn Township, Brown County, Illinois
- Elkhorn Township, Webster County, Iowa
- Elkhorn Township, Cuming County, Nebraska
- Elkhorn Township, Dodge County, Nebraska
