= Yainax Butte =

Mountain in Oregon, United States

- Location within Oregon

Highest point
- Prominence: 7,230 ft (2,200 m)
- Coordinates: 42°19′34″N 121°16′09″W

Geography
- Location: Klamath Reservation, Oregon, U.S.

Yainax Butte is a mountain located just south of the Klamath Reservation, in Oregon. Yainax is a Klamath language word meaning "little hill".

Notable residents include Toby Riddle, who lived at Yainax Butte in her later years.

== Name history ==
The butte has been known by various names such as Modoc Mountain, Bald Mountain, and Yonna Butte. The name Yainax Butte was originally applied to a smaller mountain some 12 miles (19 km) northwest, which is now known as Council Butte. Because of common usage, the US Board on Geographic Names officially changed the name to Yainax Butte in 1927.
