= Cottonwood Mountain =

Mountain range in Oregon, United States

- Location within Oregon

Highest point
- Elevation: 1,974 m (6,476 ft)

Geography
- Country: United States
- State: Oregon
- District: Malheur County
- Range coordinates: 44°10′6.569″N 117°39′43.689″W
- Topo map: USGS Brady Creek

Cottonwood Mountain is a mountain range in Malheur County, Oregon.
