= Brandy Peak =

Mountain in Oregon, United States

- Location within Oregon

Highest point
- Elevation: 5,302 ft (1,616 m)
- Prominence: 3,618 ft (1,103 m)
- Parent peak: Kerby Peak
- Isolation: 33.65 mi (54.15 km)
- Coordinates: 42°35′51″N 123°52′50″W

Geography
- Location: Curry County, Oregon

Brandy Peak (also called Squirrel Mountain or Squirrel Peak) is an 5,302-foot (1,616 m) summit in the Klamath Mountains of Curry County, Oregon in the United States. It is located in the Siskiyou National Forest, about 10 miles (16 km) east of Illahe.

== See also ==
- List of mountain peaks of Oregon
