= Laurel Mountain (Oregon) =

Peak in Oregon, United States

- Location within Oregon Location within the United States

Highest point
- Elevation: 3,592 ft (1,095 m) NAVD 88
- Prominence: 2,829 ft (862 m)
- Listing: Oregon county high points
- Coordinates: 44°55′24″N 123°34′24″W

Geography
- Location: Polk County, Oregon, U.S.
- Parent range: Central Oregon Coast Range
- Topo map: USGS Laurel Mountain

Laurel Mountain is the fourth highest peak in Oregon's Central Coast Range with an elevation of 3,592 feet (1,095 m). The peak is located in Polk County west of the city of Dallas. In 1997 it was labeled the wettest place in Oregon, and in 1996 it set an all-time calendar year rainfall record for the contiguous United States with 204.04 inches (5,182.6 mm).

== Climate ==
Laurel Mountain has a hyperhumid maritime climate, on the border between Mediterranean (Csb), oceanic (Cfb) and subpolar oceanic (Cfc/Csc). Rainfall is extremely heavy between October and April, and even in the dry months of July and August fog is very frequent and prevents soils and vegetation from drying out appreciably. In November 2006 the mountain received over 49.59 inches (1,259.6 mm) of rain – six days were lost due to gauge overflows – and in the record wet December 1996 throughout the Pacific Northwest 49.57 inches (1,259.1 mm).

Despite winter temperatures being above freezing on an average 72 of 89 afternoons – and minima above 32 °F (0 °C) on 31 mornings during a typical winter – precipitation is so heavy that snow cover in an average January reaches 9 inches (0.23 m), whilst the record seasonal snowfall is 323.50 inches (8.22 m) between July 1998 and June 1999. Since 1978 extreme temperatures have ranged from −11 °F (−23.9 °C) on December 24, 1983, to 94 °F (34.4 °C) on July 22 of 2006, though in the thirty-five years of record only fourteen minima below 0 °F (−17.8 °C) have been recorded.

Climate data for Laurel Mountain, Oregon (1991–2020 normals, extremes 1978–2017)
Month	Jan	Feb	Mar	Apr	May	Jun	Jul	Aug	Sep	Oct	Nov	Dec	Year
Record high °F (°C)	78 (26)	70 (21)	70 (21)	78 (26)	87 (31)	90 (32)	94 (34)	92 (33)	90 (32)	85 (29)	73 (23)	68 (20)	94 (34)
Mean maximum °F (°C)	56.5 (13.6)	56.5 (13.6)	57.6 (14.2)	64.7 (18.2)	74.1 (23.4)	77.3 (25.2)	83.8 (28.8)	84.4 (29.1)	81.5 (27.5)	72.7 (22.6)	60.7 (15.9)	55.4 (13.0)	87.0 (30.6)
Mean daily maximum °F (°C)	43.1 (6.2)	42.6 (5.9)	43.9 (6.6)	48.1 (8.9)	56.3 (13.5)	61.2 (16.2)	70.5 (21.4)	72.1 (22.3)	66.8 (19.3)	56.1 (13.4)	46.6 (8.1)	41.6 (5.3)	54.1 (12.3)
Daily mean °F (°C)	37.3 (2.9)	36.7 (2.6)	37.4 (3.0)	40.2 (4.6)	47.5 (8.6)	52.2 (11.2)	60.2 (15.7)	61.6 (16.4)	57.2 (14.0)	48.3 (9.1)	40.3 (4.6)	36.0 (2.2)	46.2 (7.9)
Mean daily minimum °F (°C)	31.5 (−0.3)	30.8 (−0.7)	30.9 (−0.6)	32.3 (0.2)	38.6 (3.7)	43.2 (6.2)	49.9 (9.9)	51.1 (10.6)	47.7 (8.7)	40.5 (4.7)	34.0 (1.1)	30.5 (−0.8)	38.4 (3.6)
Mean minimum °F (°C)	19.0 (−7.2)	20.0 (−6.7)	23.9 (−4.5)	25.6 (−3.6)	29.6 (−1.3)	34.3 (1.3)	40.2 (4.6)	41.3 (5.2)	37.4 (3.0)	30.0 (−1.1)	23.3 (−4.8)	18.7 (−7.4)	12.0 (−11.1)
Record low °F (°C)	−1 (−18)	−8 (−22)	16 (−9)	21 (−6)	26 (−3)	30 (−1)	36 (2)	36 (2)	32 (0)	18 (−8)	8 (−13)	−11 (−24)	−11 (−24)
Average precipitation inches (mm)	21.91 (557)	15.30 (389)	16.72 (425)	10.17 (258)	5.29 (134)	2.84 (72)	0.56 (14)	1.28 (33)	3.99 (101)	10.80 (274)	19.75 (502)	23.27 (591)	131.88 (3,350)
Average snowfall inches (cm)	22.0 (56)	23.6 (60)	22.1 (56)	16.8 (43)	2.4 (6.1)	0.0 (0.0)	0.0 (0.0)	0.0 (0.0)	0.0 (0.0)	0.6 (1.5)	10.8 (27)	23.8 (60)	122.1 (309.6)
Average extreme snow depth inches (cm)	23.0 (58)	24.2 (61)	24.2 (61)	18.1 (46)	6.3 (16)	0.0 (0.0)	0.0 (0.0)	0.0 (0.0)	0.0 (0.0)	0.4 (1.0)	7.7 (20)	17.9 (45)	36.5 (93)
Average precipitation days (≥ 0.01 inch)	19.8	15.5	18.5	17.3	12.0	8.2	2.7	3.1	6.0	13.0	17.6	18.8	152.5
Average snowy days (≥ 0.1 in)	5.0	5.6	7.2	5.9	1.2	0.0	0.0	0.0	0.0	0.4	3.6	7.0	35.9
Source 1: NOAA
Source 2: WRCC (snowfall)
