= Elkhorn Lake =

Lake in the state of Minnesota, United States

- Location within Minnesota
- Location: Kandiyohi County, Minnesota, U.S. state
- Coordinates: 45°12′41″N 94°56′37″W

Elkhorn Lake is a lake in Kandiyohi County, in the U.S. state of Minnesota.

Elkhorn Lake was named for a large set of antlers found near the lake in the 1850s.

== See also ==
- List of lakes in Minnesota
