= Elkhorn Park, Lexington =

Elkhorn Park
- Neighborhood of Lexington, Kentucky
- Interactive map of Elkhorn Park
- Coordinates: 38.072°N 84.471°W
- Country: United States
- State: Kentucky
- County: Fayette
- City: Lexington

Area
  - Total: 0.23 sq mi (0.60 km^{2})

Population (2000)
  - Total: 359
  - Density: 1,705/sq mi (658.3/km^{2})
- Time zone: UTC-5 (Eastern (EST))
  - Summer (DST): UTC-4 (EDT)
- ZIP code: 40505
- Area code: 859

Elkhorn Park is a neighborhood in northern Lexington, Kentucky, United States. Its boundaries are Dover Road to the north, North Broadway to the east, New Circle Road to the south, and Russell Cave Road to the west.

== Neighborhood statistics ==
- Area: 0.230 square miles (0.60 km^{2})
- Population: 395
- Population density: 1,716 people per square mile
- Median household income: $55,204
