= Paulina Mountains =

Mountain range in Oregon, United States

- Location within Oregon

Highest point
- Elevation: 2,429 m (7,969 ft)

Geography
- Country: United States
- State: Oregon
- District: Deschutes County
- Range coordinates: 43°41′21.438″N 121°15′17.076″W
- Topo map: USGS Paulina Peak

The Paulina Mountains are a mountain range in Deschutes County, Oregon. There are 97 named mountains in the Paulina Mountains, the tallest and most famous one being Paulina Peak, which sits at 7,969 feet in elevation."Paulina Peak serves as the highest point of the Newberry Volcano, a large active stratovolcano that sits just 35 miles east of the crest of the Cascade Range. These summits are actually the remnants of an old crater called the Newberry Crater.

The Newberry Volcano covers an area the size of Rhode Island and has erupted repeatedly over the past 400,000 years. Although the volcano hasn't erupted recently, its unique composition and numerous volcanic vents make it prone to very explosive and destructive eruptions.

== Hiking Trails ==
The Paulina Mountains contains 50,000 acres of lakes, lava flows, geological features, and has cinder cones.

Paulina Peak offers sweeping views of the Newberry Caldera, the south and west flanks of the Newberry Volcano, the nearby Cascades, and the Fort Rock Basin. Paulina Peak can be accessed via a scenic road or a 6.1-mile out and back trail.

The Newberry Caldera is where most visitors go to experience scenic hiking trails and is the largest developed area in within the national monument. Paulina and East Lake offer ample opportunities for boating, kayaking, or fishing. There are also twelve different trails that range from .25 miles to 21 miles long. Several of these trails offer informative, interpretive signs, picnic areas, and even hot springs for tourists to enjoy. In the winter, this region becomes a popular destination for snow activities such as skiing, snowmobiling, and snowshoeing.

The Crater Rim Trail circumnavigates the Newberry Volcano Rim and allows hikers to hike along the rim and drop down to get up close to the lake. In addition, there are a few trails that lead from the Crater Rim Trail to both Paulina Peak and North Paulina Peak.

The Lava River Cave is a trail that allows visitors to explore a mile-long lava tube. The trek takes around 1.5 hours to complete and descends to flat boardwalks and stairways leading through the features of the tube.

== Major Cities and Resorts ==
=== East Lake Resort ===
Known as the “Unique Oregon Experience,” East Lake Resort is a full-service resort that sits 45 miles from southeast Bend on the scenic shores of East Lake. This near the East Lake, which sits at 6,400 feet in elevation, and is known as one of the best fisheries in Oregon, watercraft, like fishing boats and pontoons, are available for rent at the resort. The resort is known for its remoteness and sits at the heart of the Newberry National Volcanic Monument. There are several classic cabins, tent sites, and RV sites available for rent, as well as a pub-style grill and on-site general store.

=== Bend ===
Bend is the largest city near the Paulina Mountains and sits on the eastern edge of the Cascade Range along the Deschutes River. Bend is a popular destination for Oregon explorers looking to partake in a variety of outdoor sports like hiking, mountain biking, fishing, camping, rock climbing, paragliding, and white-water rafting.
