= Elkhorn Township, Cuming County, Nebraska =

Elkhorn Township
- Township
- Location in Cuming County
- Coordinates: 41°52′22″N 096°50′46″W
- Country: United States
- State: Nebraska
- County: Cuming

Area
  - Total: 35.95 sq mi (93.11 km^{2})
  - Land: 35.83 sq mi (92.79 km^{2})
  - Water: 0.13 sq mi (0.33 km^{2}) 0.35%
- Elevation: 1,437 ft (438 m)

Population (2020)
  - Total: 244
  - Density: 6.81/sq mi (2.63/km^{2})
- GNIS feature ID: 0837983

Elkhorn Township is one of sixteen townships in Cuming County, Nebraska, United States. The population was 244 at the 2020 census. A 2021 estimate placed the township's population at 242.

== See also ==
- County government in Nebraska
