= Rogers Peak =

Mountain in Oregon, United States

- Location within Oregon Location within the United States

Highest point
- Elevation: 3,706 ft (1,130 m)
- Prominence: 3,034 ft (925 m)
- Coordinates: 45°39′52″N 123°32′54″W

Geography
- Location: Tillamook County, Oregon, U.S.
- Parent range: Northern Oregon Coast Range
- Topo map: USGS Rogers Peak

Rogers Peak is the highest mountain in Tillamook County, Oregon. Located in the Tillamook State Forest, the peak is also the highest peak in the Northern Oregon Coast Range, which is the northern section of the Oregon Coast Range.

== Geology ==
The origins of these mountains began approximately 40 million years ago during the Eocene age. During this time period, sandstone and siltstone formed in the area. Additionally, igneous rocks and basalt flows combined with basaltic sandstone to create many of the mountainous formations. Other sedimentary rock in the area formed more recently, around 20 million years ago. It is hypothesized that portions of the area were islands during parts of the Eocene era. The entire coast range sits on a convergent tectonic margin interacting with the Juan de Fuca Plate that is subducting beneath North America tectonic plate. The range is part of a broad, plunging structural arch of sedimentary and Tertiary volcanic strata that is being uplifted. Other portions of the mountains consist of marine sedimentary rock. The basalt in the area comes from basalt flows that covered much of Oregon that originated from fissures in the central portion of the state. It was during the middle Miocene period that the range was uplifted in the broad, northeast-plunging arch.

== Flora and fauna ==
Forested parts of the mountain include Sitka spruce, western redcedar, Douglas-fir, and western hemlock. Other plant life native to the mountain are Coptis laciniata, salmonberry, salal, sword fern, Oregon grape, bracken fern, and others. Invertebrates include millipedes, collembolans, spiders, beetles, and various centipedes. Animals that inhabit the area are weasels, chipmunks. black bears, snowshoe hares and deer. Birds include chickadees, kinglets, woodpeckers, jays, brown creepers, and red crossbills.

== Location ==
Rogers Peak is approximately 8 miles (13 km) north of Lees Camp on Oregon Route 6 with access via North Fork Road. Hiking the mountain is about a 3.5 miles (5.6 km) round-trip with an elevation gain of about 1,100 feet (340 m). The mountain, located on private timber land, is near the Oregon Coast.

== Name history ==
In 1964 the mountain officially became Rogers Peak. Previously, it had also been referred to as Blue Lake Peak and Nels Rogers Peak. The mountain was named for Nelson S. Rogers, who was the Oregon State Forester from 1940 to 1949. He was a prominent figure in the rehabilitation of the Tillamook Burn.
