= Greenhorn Mountains (Oregon) =

Mountain range in Oregon, United States

- Location within Oregon

Highest point
- Elevation: 8,133 ft (2,479 m)

Geography
- Country: United States
- State: Oregon
- Counties: Grant, Baker
- Range coordinates: 44°42′50″N 118°33′42″W
- Topo map: USGS Vinegar Hill

The Greenhorn Mountains are a small mountain range in Grant and Baker counties in the U.S. state of Oregon. They are part of the Blue Mountains.

== See also ==
- Greenhorn, Oregon
