= Hart Mountain =

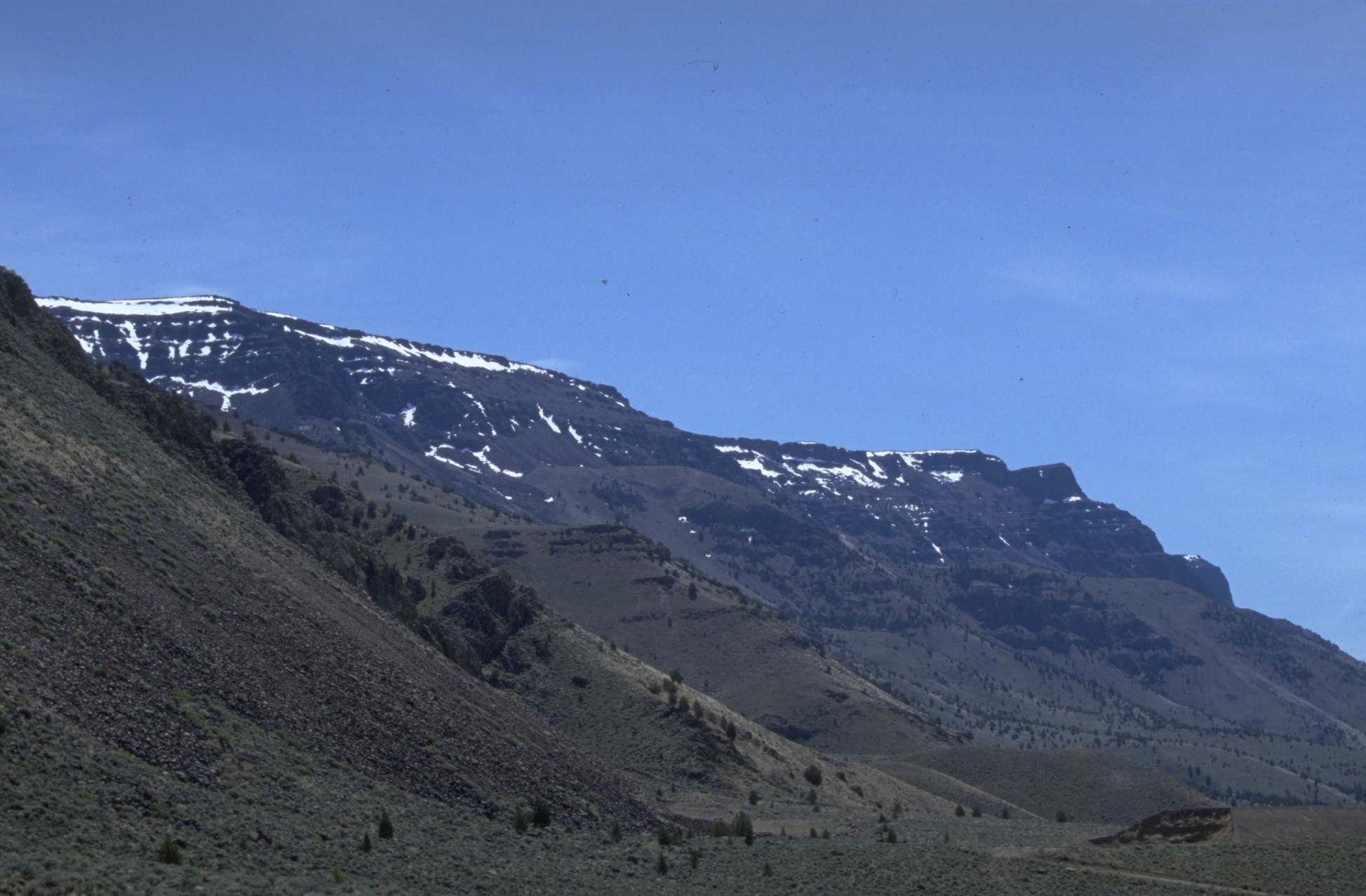
- West face of Hart Mountain

Highest point
- Peak: Warner Peak
- Elevation: 8,024 ft (2,446 m) NAVD 88
- Prominence: 2,117 ft (645 m)
- Coordinates: 42°27′35″N 119°44′29″W

Geography
- Location within Oregon
- Location: Lake County, Oregon, U.S.
- Parent range: Hart Mountain
- Topo map(s): USGS Warner Peak and USGS Hart Lake

Hart Mountain is a fault-block mountain, in Lake County, Oregon, U.S. It lies about 30 miles (48 km) to the east of Lakeview.

It is sometimes confused with a mountain range, but is more properly described as a mountain. The two highest peaks are Warner Peak and Hart Peak. Warner Peak is the highest point on the mountain, at 8,024 feet (2,446 m). Hart Peak is 7,724 feet (2,354 m) and is located at 42°24′49″N 119°48′03″W.

Hart Mountain is named for the heart-shaped brand used by the pioneer ranchers Henry C. Wilson and his son-in-law C.G. Alexander. Their ranch was located in the Warner Valley at the base of Hart Mountain.

The top of the mountain is part of the Hart Mountain National Antelope Refuge, with pronghorn antelope and bighorn sheep. At the western base of the mountain lies the Warner Wetlands ACEC, a reserve managed by the Bureau of Land Management and home to waterfowl and other wildlife. A trail leads half a mile into the wetlands to a hide.

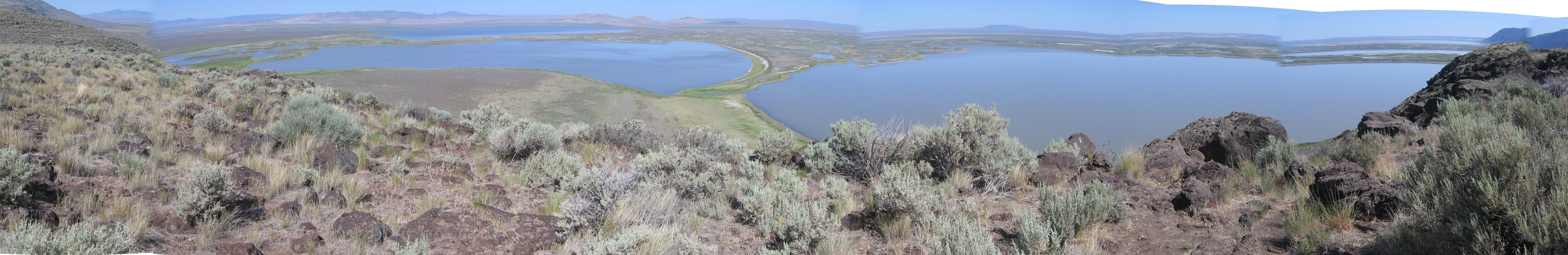
View from Hart Mountain
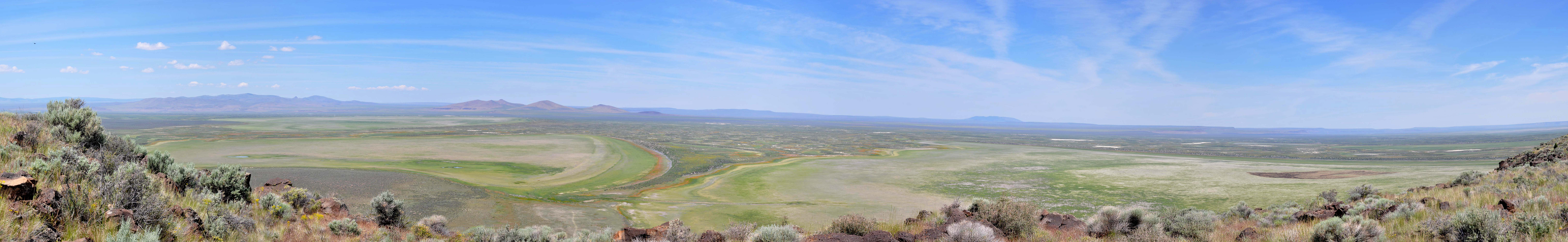
The same view during low water in June 2015. Upper Campbell Lake is to the left, Campbell Lake to the right
