= Drake Peak =

Mountain in Oregon, United States

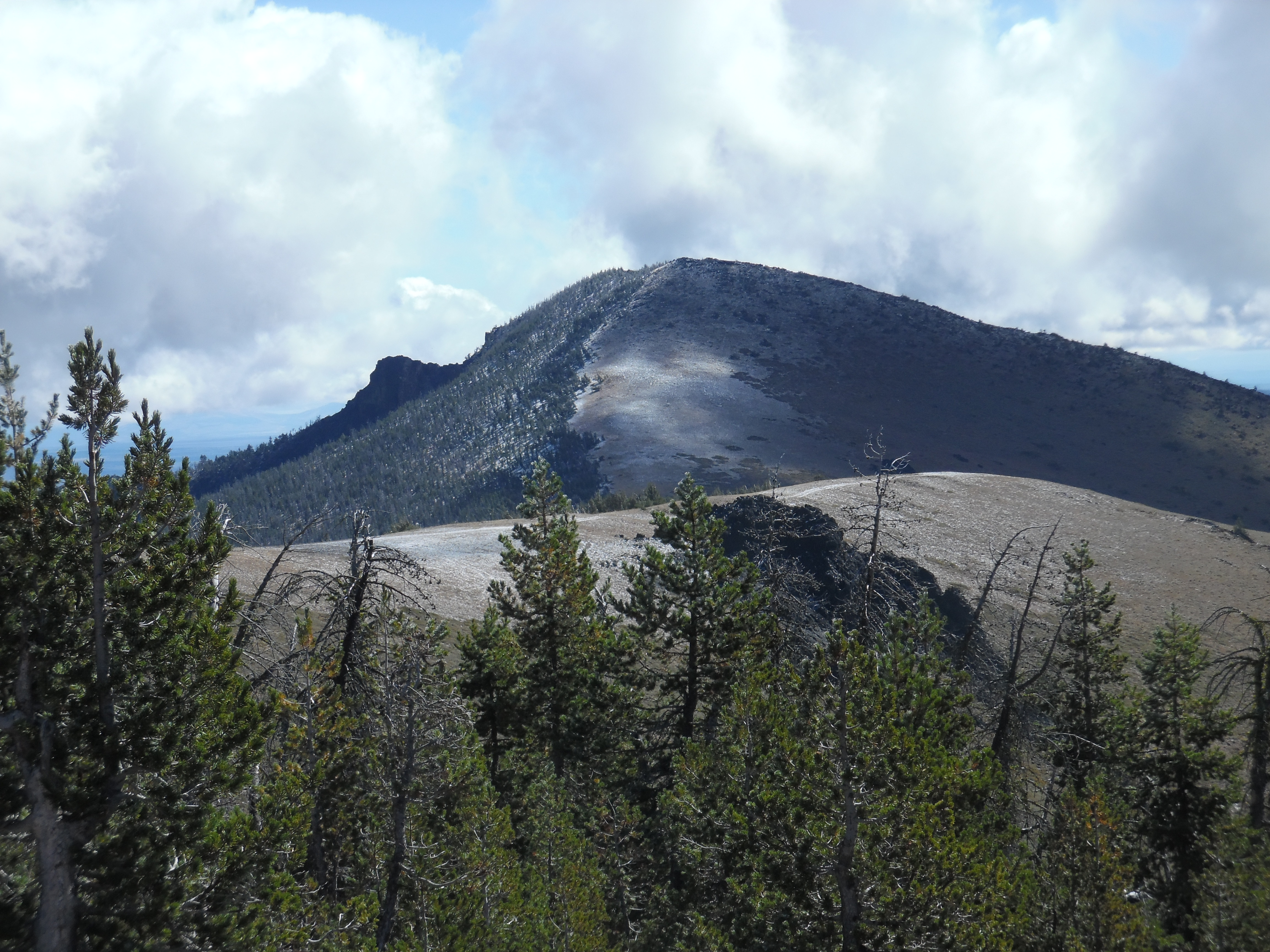
- Drake Peak viewed from Light Peak

Highest point
- Elevation: 8,399 ft (2,560 m)
- Prominence: 2,547 ft (776 m)
- Isolation: 17.34 mi (27.91 km)
- Listing: Mountain peaks of Oregon
- Coordinates: 42°18′01″N 120°07′25″W

Naming
- Etymology: John M. Drake

Geography
- Location within Oregon
- Location: Lake County, Oregon

Geology
- Mountain type: Volcanic complex
- Rock type: Rhyolite
- Volcanic arc: Warner Mountains
- Last eruption: Miocene

Drake Peak is an 8,399-foot (2,560 m) summit of the Warner Mountains in Lake County, Oregon in the United States. It is located in the Fremont National Forest. The mountain is named in honor of Lieutenant Colonel John M. Drake, a Union Army officer who served in both the 1st Oregon Cavalry and the 1st Oregon Infantry regiments during the American Civil War.

== Geology ==
Drake Peak is an rhyolitic volcanic complex. Approximately 6,000 vertical feet of andesite and basalt flows from the late Eocene period form the foundation of the mountain. That structure is covered by basaltic andesite, tuff, and flood basalts from the late Eocene and early Miocene with a dome of rhyolite capping the mountain structure. It last erupted in the Miocene period.

== Lookout ==
The Drake Peak lookout is located about a mile west of Drake Peak on neighboring Light Peak, at an elevation of 8,222-foot (2,506 m) above sea level. The lookout is a L-4 Aladdin ground cabin, built in 1948. Visitors can drive to the lookout. From there, they can hike across the saddle between the two peaks and then climb to the top of Drake Peak.

== Environment ==
The north slope of Drake Peak is covered by a ponderosa pine forest while low sagebrush dominates the rockier southern slope. Some areas also have quaking aspen and several fir species. Local wild flowers include bitterroot, aster, goldenweed, and penstemon.

The habitats around Drake Peak supports a variety of large mammal species including mule deer, Rocky Mountain elk, pronghorn, American black bear, bobcats, and mountain lions. Common birds in the sky around Drake Peak include prairie falcons, golden eagles, and bald eagles.
