= Anthony Lakes =

Anthony Lakes may refer to:

- Anthony Lakes (Oregon), a group of about 15 lakes and marshes in northeastern Oregon
- Anthony Lakes (ski area), in eastern Oregon
