= Little Malheur River =

- Location of the mouth of the Little Malheur River in Oregon

Location
- Country: United States
- State: Oregon
- County: Baker, Grant, Malheur, and Harney

Physical characteristics
- Source: Bullrun Rock
  - location: Monument Rock Wilderness, Wallowa–Whitman National Forest, Baker County, Blue Mountains
  - coordinates: 44°20′02″N 118°19′47″W
  - elevation: 7,138 ft (2,176 m)
- Mouth: North Fork Malheur River
  - location: Horse Flat, Harney County
  - coordinates: 44°01′08″N 118°15′32″W
  - elevation: 3,678 ft (1,121 m)
- Length: 31 mi (50 km)
- Basin size: 135 sq mi (350 km^{2})
- Discharge
  - average: 18 cu ft/s (0.51 m^{3}/s)

The Little Malheur River is a 31-mile (50 km) tributary of the North Fork Malheur River in the eastern part of the U.S. state of Oregon. Beginning on the flanks of Bullrun Rock in the Monument Rock Wilderness of the Blue Mountains, the river flows generally south through parts of two national forests, Wallowa–Whitman and Malheur to meet the North Fork at Horse Flat, north of Juntura. Despite its short length, it flows through parts of four counties, listed from source to mouth: Baker, Grant, Malheur, and Harney.

In 2002, fire burned much of the forest along the canyon of the upper river. The Little Malheur Trail, maintained by the United States Forest Service, follows the river for about 7 miles (11 km) through the wildfire area.

== See also ==
- List of rivers of Oregon
