= Anthony Lakes (Oregon) =

- North Powder Lakes
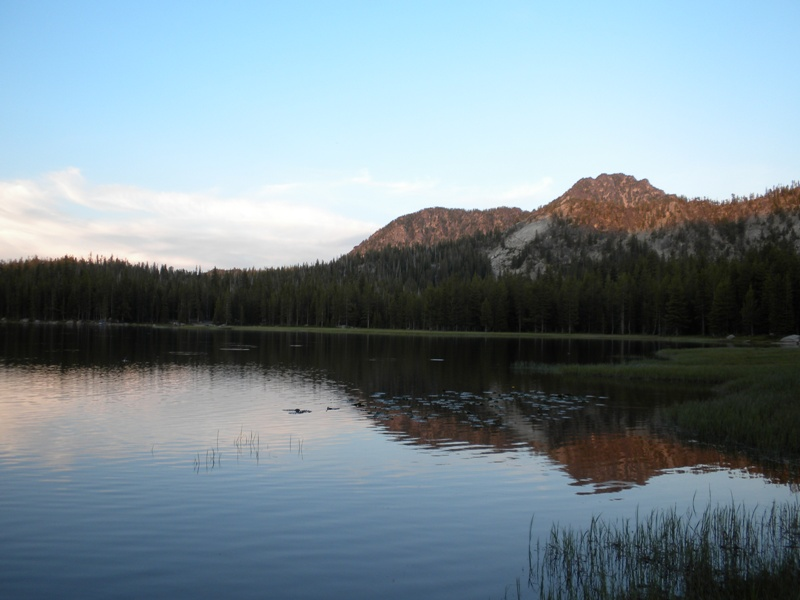
- Anthony Lakes in 2009

- Location within Oregon Location within the United States
- Interactive map of Anthony Lakes
- Location: Blue Mountains; North Powder, Oregon
- Coordinates: 44.959025°N 118.232997°W
- Type: Subalpine lakes and marshes
- Primary inflows: Snowmelt
- Basin countries: United States
- Surface area: 19 acres (7.7 ha)
- Average depth: 30 feet (9.1 m)
- Surface elevation: 7,136 feet (2,175 m)
- Sections/sub-basins: Grande Ronde Lake, Mud Lake, Floodwater Flats, Anthony Lake, Lilypad Lake, and Hoffer Lakes
- References: U.S. Geological Survey Geographic Names Information System: Anthony Lakes

Anthony Lakes (also North Powder Lakes) are a group of about 15 subalpine lakes and marshes in the Blue Mountains of northeastern Oregon, U.S.

The group contains Grande Ronde Lake, Mud Lake, Floodwater Flats, Anthony Lake, Lilypad Lake, Hoffer Lakes, and several unnamed marshes and shallow lakes.

== See also ==
- Anthony Lakes (ski area)
