= Rock Creek Lake =

Lake in the U.S. state of Oregon

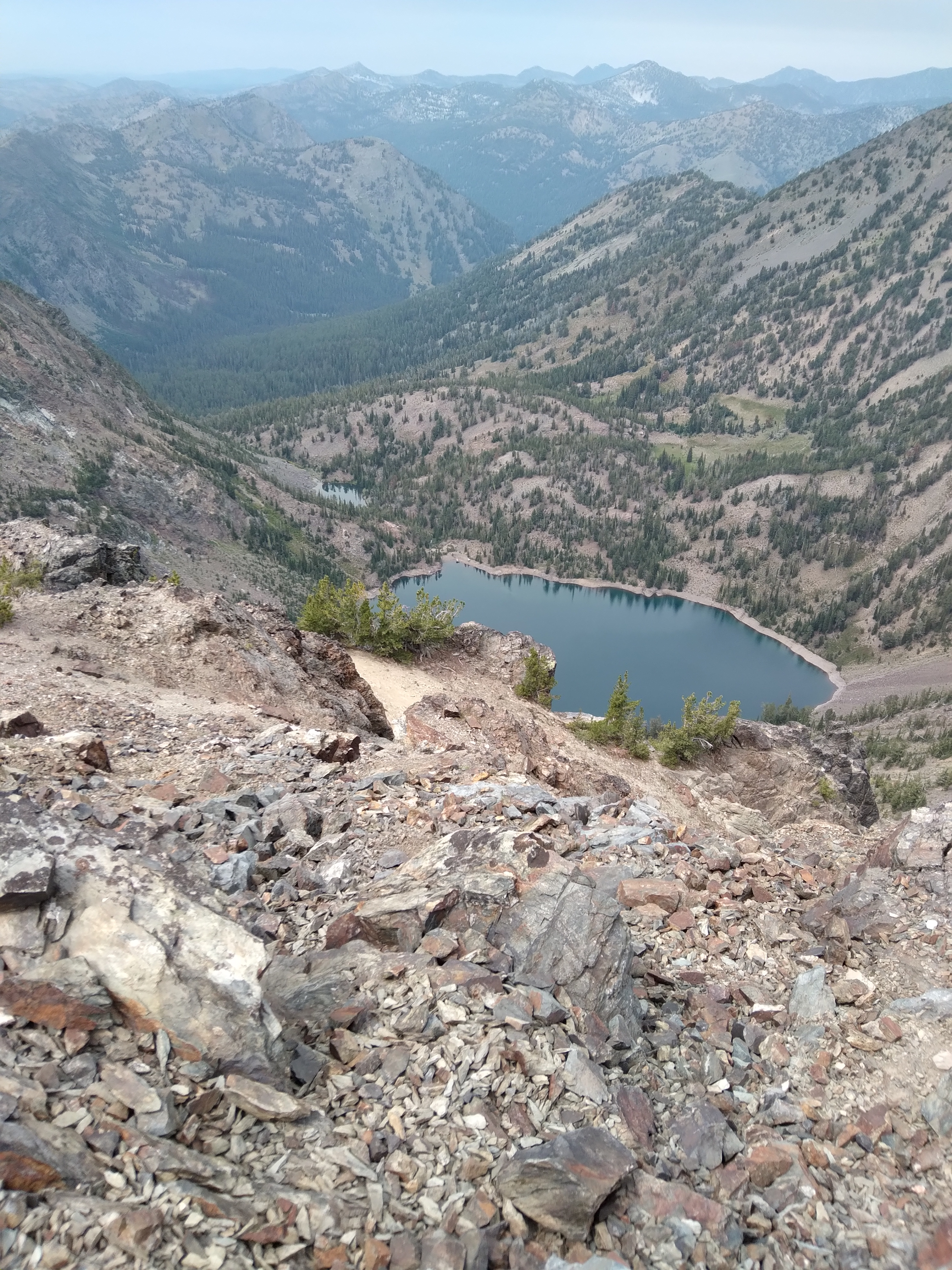
- Rock Creek Lake from Rock Creek Butte summit.

- Location of Rock Creek Lake in Oregon, USA. Rock Creek Lake (the United States)
- Location: Elkhorn Mountains, Baker County, Oregon
- Coordinates: 44.808158°N 118.086854°W
- Type: Glacial Cirque Tarn
- Primary inflows: Precipitation, basin drainage
- Primary outflows: Lake Creek
- Basin countries: United States
- Surface area: 35 acres (14 ha)
- Average depth: 104 ft (32 m)
- Surface elevation: 7,600 ft (2,300 m)

Rock Creek Lake is an alpine lake along the Elkhorn Crest trail in the southern end of the Elkhorn Mountains in Baker County, eastern Oregon. It is located on the northern slope of Rock Creek Butte, the highest point in the Elkhorn Mountains range. While the lake is located on a glacial cirque, it is part of the West Fork Rock Creek drainage basin.

Other alpine lakes are found a short distance from Rock Creek Lake. Sharing a neighboring cirque is Bucket Lake, to the south over the southern skirt of Rock Creek Butte is Twin Lakes and to the east is Goodrich Lake over the Elkhorn Crest trail. Rock Creek Lake empties into a second smaller lake which later produces Rock Creek and small waterfalls along its course to join the North Fork Rock Creek.

== Geology ==
Rock Creek Lake lays within the Rock Creek Glacier, which originated from a cirques at the base of the butte. The glacier meltwater flowed northwest in the direction of the cirque and then veered northeast producing a confluence with the North Fork of Rock Creek. A second flow came from Willow Creek Glacier that intersected the Rock Creek Glacier. The northern slope of the cirque has been mined for chrysotiles and asbestos.

== Ecology ==
The major biomes are the lake itself, which is an aquatic biome, and the surrounding region, which is classified as temperate coniferous forest. It is nested within the Blue Mountains ecoregion, the largest in the state of Oregon. The Elkhorn Crest trail is east of the lake. The lake has several species of fish, including Bass, Bluegill, Crappie, and Sauger. Opposite of Rock Creek Lake is Pine Creek Reservoir which has a Uranium occurrence, part of the Rock Creek Mining District.

== Mountain goats ==
The hills that surround Rock Creek lake are a frequented location by mountain goats. A census in 2019 yielded 100 goats in the Twin Lakes basin, approximately a third of the goats in the Elkhorn mountain range. The population was established after 21 goats were released between 1983 and 1986 along the Pine Creek drainage, a short distance north of Rock Creek Lakes. These individuals had been purposefully trapped in Idaho, Olympic National Park in Washington and Misty Fjords National Monument in Alaska for transplant in the Elkhorn Mountains.

== See also ==
- List of lakes of Oregon
