= Vinegar Hill-Indian Rock Scenic Area =

Scenic area in Oregon, United States

Coordinates: 44.73°N 118.63°W

The Vinegar Hill-Indian Rock Scenic Area is a high-elevation scenic area in the northeast portion of the Malheur National Forest in the state of Oregon. It provides vistas of the North Fork John Day Wilderness, the Middle and North Fork drainages of the John Day River, and the peaks of the Strawberry Mountain Wilderness to the south. Many species of alpine wildflower found west of the Rocky Mountains grow in the area. Big game species and upland game birds are common. The area's rich geologic past means a variety of rock formations including basalt, rhyolite, granite, and shales can be seen here. The area has a history of mining, and active and decaying remains of mines can be seen. Motor vehicles are prohibited, except during winter when snowmobiles are allowed.

A portion of the Vinegar Hill-Indian Rock Scenic Area lies within the Desolation Watershed.
