= Strawberry Range =

Mountain range in Oregon, United States

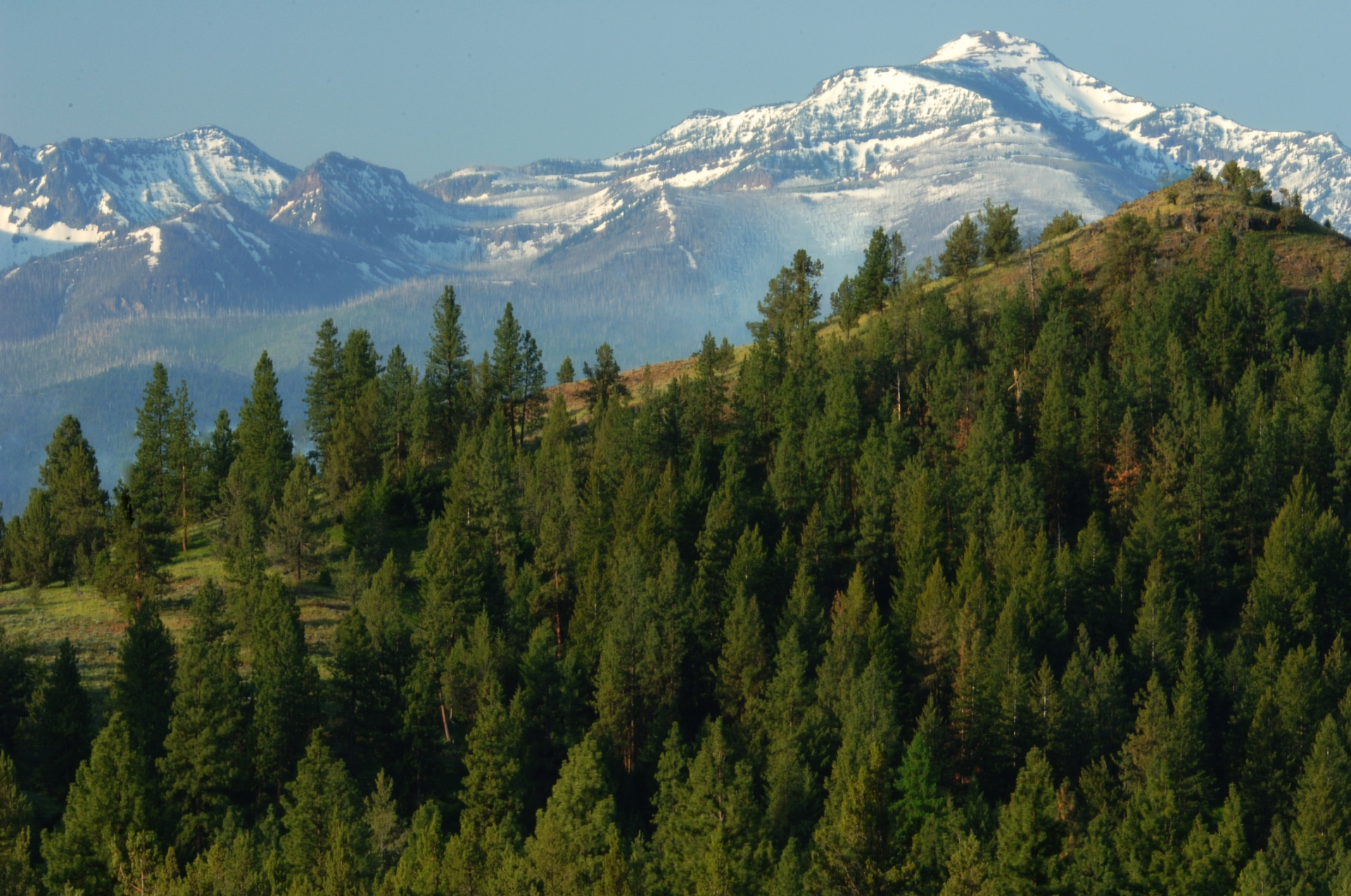

Highest point
- Peak: Strawberry Mountain
- Elevation: 2,750 m (9,020 ft)
- Coordinates: 44°18′45″N 118°43′00″W

Geography
- Location within Oregon
- Country: United States
- State: Oregon
- County: Grant County
- Range coordinates: 44°18′29.577″N 118°35′3.789″W
- Topo map: USGS Roberts Creek

The Strawberry Range, also known as the Strawberry Mountains, is a mountain range in the U.S. state of Oregon. It is east of John Day, within Malheur National Forest. The highest peak, Strawberry Mountain, is the most prominent feature of the Strawberry Mountain Wilderness and the 30th highest point in Oregon.

The Strawberry Range is part of the larger Blue Mountains range, and contains the Strawberry Mountain Wilderness. Pioneers named Strawberry Mountain after observing prolific wild strawberries growing in a nearby valley.

The area has extremely diverse ecological composition, which includes five of seven major life zones in North America. Indigenous populations of Rocky Mountain Elk exist as well as mule deer, antelope, black bear, cougar, California bighorn sheep, ruffed and blue grouse, pileated woodpecker, sharp-shinned hawk, bald eagle, pine marten, mink, beaver. There are 378 animal and 22 fish species present.

Mountain goats are seen at the higher elevations of the Palisades ridge as of Aug 7, 2016. A hunting tag for mountain goats on the Strawberry Mountain was issued for the first time in 2014 by the Oregon Department of Fish and Wildlife.

== Recreation ==
Normal hiking season is July to November, though snow may be encountered at any time of the year at higher elevations. Strawberry Camp, 1.3 miles (2.1 km) downstream from the Strawberry Lake along Strawberry Creek, is connected to the lake by a hiking trail. The trail continues upstream 1.2 miles (1.9 km) from the lake to 40-foot (12 m) Strawberry Falls and then another 0.6 miles (1.0 km) to Little Strawberry Lake. Another trail leads from Strawberry Falls 6.3 miles (10.1 km) to the peak of Strawberry Mountain.

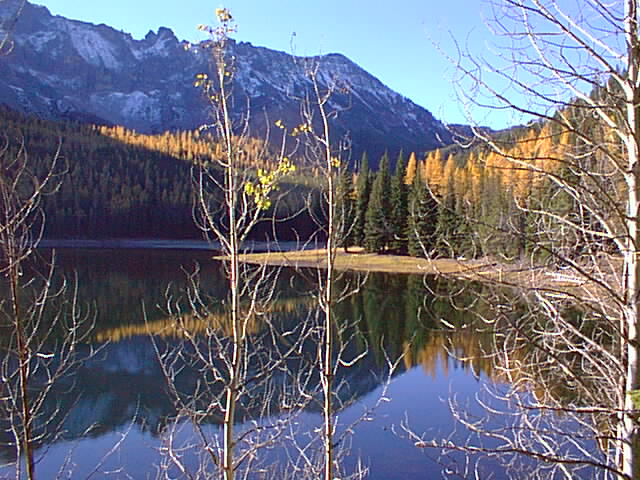
Strawberry Lake
