= Monument Rocks =

Monument Rocks may refer to:

== Places ==
=== Antarctica ===
- Monument Rocks (Antarctica), a group of rocks lying of the coast of the Antarctic Peninsula.

=== United States ===
- Monument Rocks (Kansas), a series of large chalk formations in Gove County, Kansas.
- Monument Rock Wilderness, a wilderness area within the Blue Mountains of eastern Oregon.
