= Twin Lakes (Baker County, Oregon) =

Lake in the U.S. state of Oregon

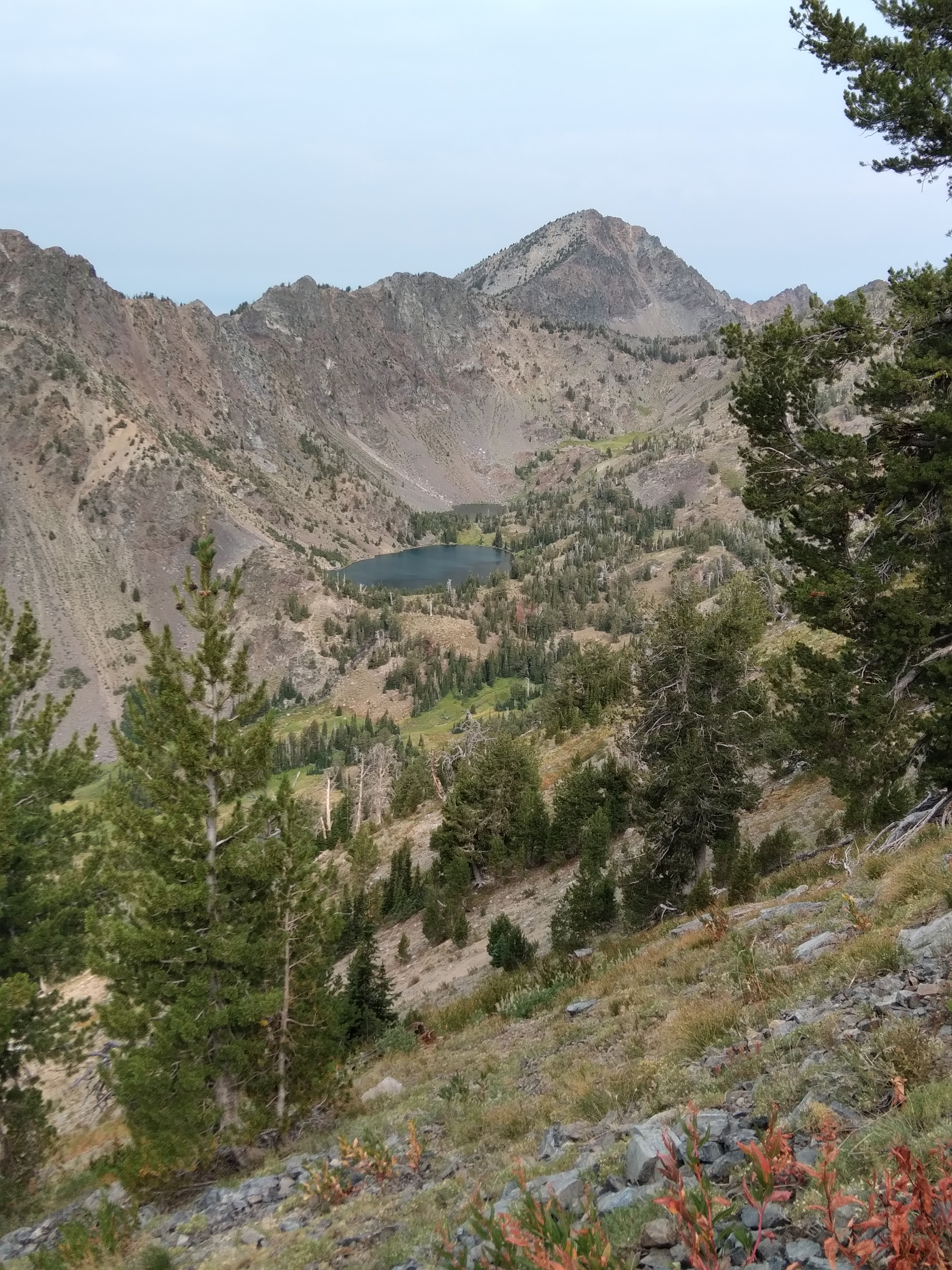
- Twin Lakes from Elkhorn Range trail with Rock Creek Butte in the background.

- Location of Twin Lakes in Oregon, USA. Twin Lakes (the United States)
- Location: Elkhorn Mountains, Baker County, Oregon
- Coordinates: 44.808158°N 118.086854°W
- Type: Glacial Cirque Tarn
- Primary inflows: Precipitation, basin drainage
- Primary outflows: Lake Creek
- Basin countries: United States
- Surface area: 9 acres (3.6 ha)
- Average depth: 40 ft (12 m)
- Surface elevation: 7,665 ft (2,336 m)

Twin Lakes is the name of a set of two alpine lakes along the Elkhorn Crest trail in the southern end of the Elkhorn Mountains in Baker County, eastern Oregon. It is a popular area for hikers, camping, fishing and sightseers seeking to see mountain goats that frequent the western hillside of the lake. Hiking to Twin Lakes is approximately 4 miles from Marble Pass. The highest point in the range is Rock Creek Butte, located on the northern ridge above the lakes.

Other alpine lakes are found a short distance from Twin Lakes. To the north over the northern skirt of Rock Creek Butte is Rock Creek Lake and Bucket Lake and to the east is Goodrich Lake over the Elkhorn Crest trail.

== Ecology ==
Twin Lakes is surrounded by an open forest with scattered old growth spruce and Douglas-fir trees. It is surrounded by open hillside meadows with wildflowers in the summer. Resident osprey and bluebirds nest in the area around Twin Lakes. Mountain goats are often seen in their haunts on the ridge west of the Twin Lakes basin.

=== Mountain Goats ===
The Twin Lakes basin is a frequented location by mountain goats. A census in 2019 yielded 100 goats in the Twin Lakes basin, approximately a third of the goats in the Elkhorn mountain range. The population was established after 21 goats were released between 1983 and 1986 along the Pine Creek drainage, a short distance north of the Twin Lakes. These individuals had been purposefully trapped in Idaho, Washington and Alaska. Goats are now trapped by wildlife management within the Elkhorn Mountains for transplant to other regions of Oregon, including the neighboring Wallowa Mountains, Hells Canyon.

== Geology ==
Twin Lakes lay within the Lake Creek Glacier which was fed by two cirques and is a location of unknown age. The glacier generated ice water flowed southeast from the ridge and then veered south at the cirque. The glacial deposits that remained are primarily unconsolidated and unsorted accumulations of boulders, cobbles and gravel rocks. The Elkhorn Ridge Argillite surrounds the cirques and is primarily composed of deformed sedimentary rock, primarily dark-colored siliceous argillite.

== Activities ==
Twin Lakes is located along Elkhorn Crest trail, the highest trail in the Blue Mountains. Twin lakes is a frequent stop for hunters, day hikers, backpackers, mountain bikers and horseback riders that travel along Elkhorn Crest trail. There are no facilities or amenities located around the lakes. Camping areas exist along the large flat meadow just above the eastern shore of the lakes as well as between the two lakes that also provide for grazing for horses.

== See also ==
- List of lakes of Oregon
