= Strawberry Lake (Oregon) =

Lake in the U.S. state of Oregon

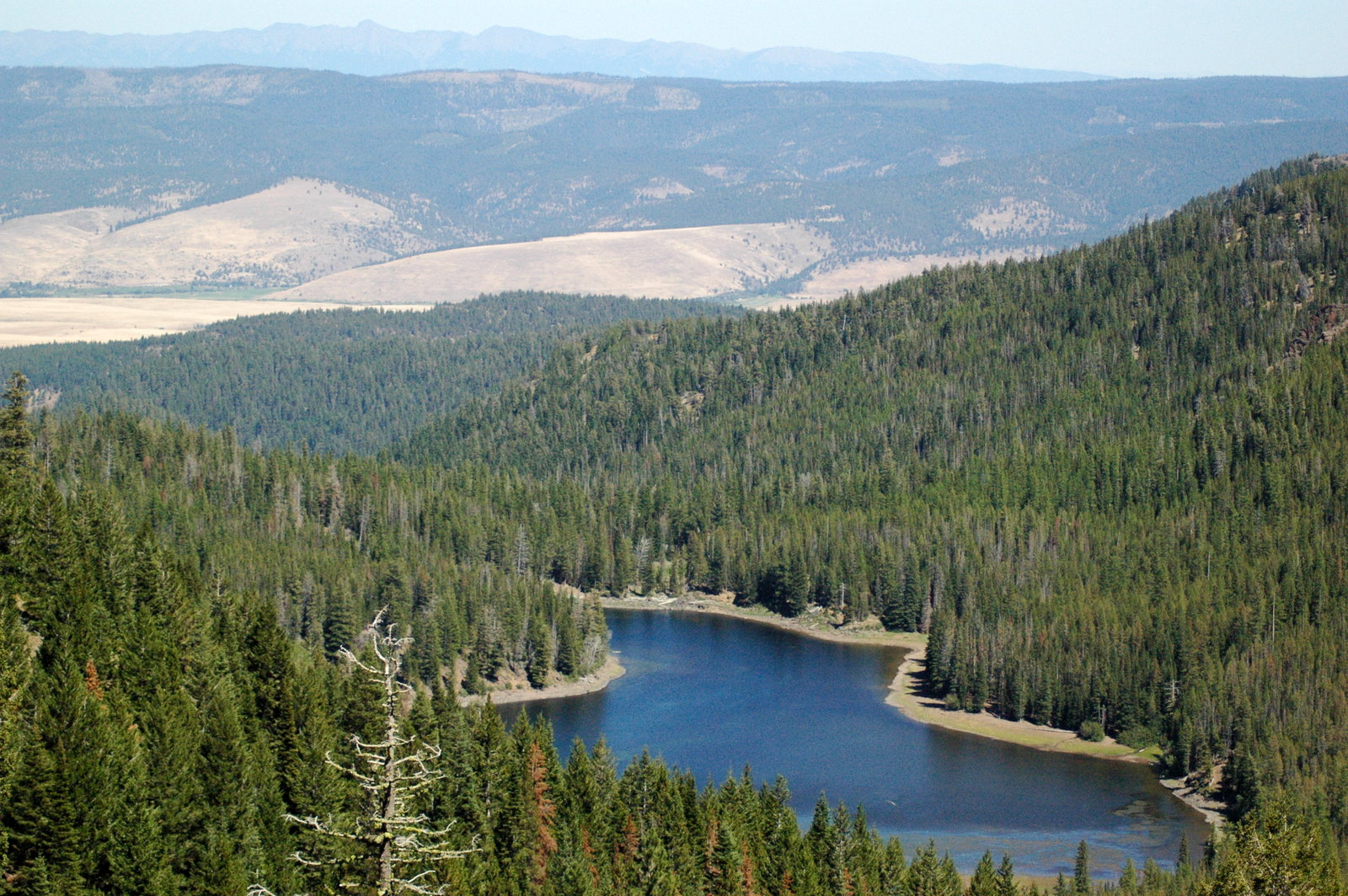
- View from the mountain

- Location within Oregon Location within the United States
- Location: Grant County, Oregon
- Coordinates: 44°18′25″N 118°41′00″W
- Type: Natural, permanent, oligotrophic
- Primary inflows: Strawberry Creek
- Primary outflows: Strawberry Creek
- Catchment area: 3.5 square miles (9.1 km^{2})
- Basin countries: United States
- Surface area: 36 acres (15 ha)
- Average depth: 9 feet (2.7 m)
- Max. depth: 27 feet (8.2 m)
- Water volume: 300 acre-feet (370,000 m^{3})
- Residence time: 1 month
- Shore length^{1}: 1.2 miles (1.9 km)
- Surface elevation: 6,266 feet (1,910 m)
- Settlements: Prairie City
- ^{1} Shore length is not a well-defined measure.

Strawberry Lake is a natural high-elevation body of water in the Strawberry Mountain Wilderness in the U.S. state of Oregon. Located in the Malheur National Forest about 10 miles (16 km) south of Prairie City in Grant County, the shallow lake covers about 36 acres (150,000 m^{2}) surrounded by forest. Recreational activities in the lake basin include hiking, backpacking, skiing, and fishing.

== Geology and geography ==
Stratovolcanoes erupting about 14.7 million years ago in the Miocene covered about 500 square miles (1,300 km^{2}) of what later became Grant County with andesite lavas and mudflows. The Strawberry Mountains are eroded remnants of the mountains created by those volcanoes and by intrusions of igneous rock.

Strawberry Lake is the largest of the small glacial lakes found in the Strawberry Mountain Wilderness. The surface of the lake is more than 6,000 feet (1,800 m) above sea level. Occupying part of a valley carved by ice in the Pleistocene, the lake formed behind a landslide dam across Strawberry Creek. Water from the lake does not flow over the dam except in high water but seeps through the landslide to re-form the creek several hundred yards (meters) downstream.

Strawberry Lake has an average depth of 9 feet (2.7 m) and a maximum depth of 27 feet (8.2 m). The length of its shoreline is about 1.2 miles (1.9 km). Despite water-quality problems stemming from recreational activity in the lake's drainage basin, the water remains transparent enough that the lake bottom is visible from the surface even at the lake's deepest point.

== History ==
Nathan W. Fisk homesteaded in the area in 1870 and named local features Strawberry Butte (now Strawberry Mountain) and Strawberry Creek for the abundance of wild strawberries in the area, and the name spread to encompass Strawberry Valley and Strawberry Lake.

== Recreation ==
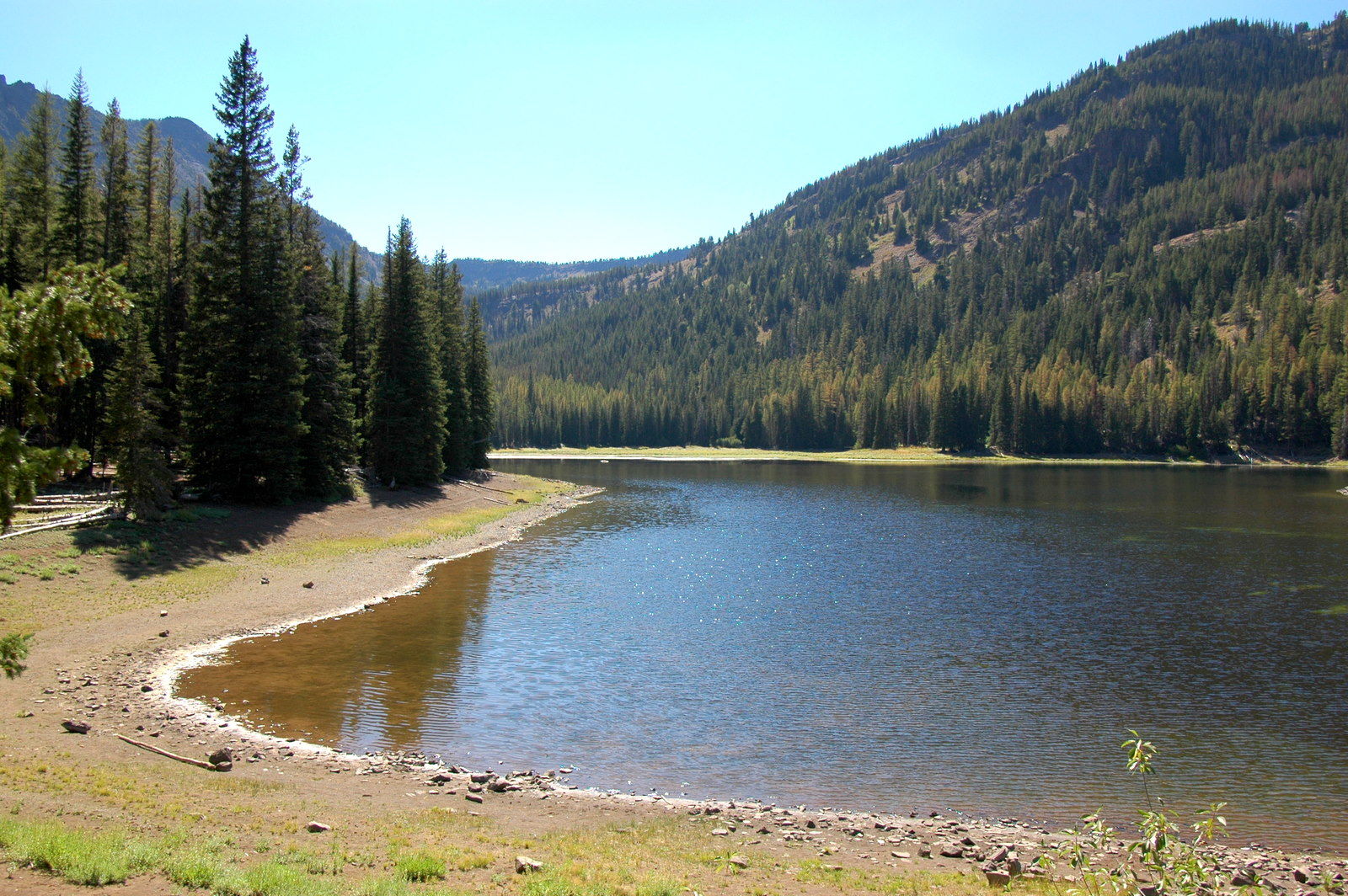
View from the edge of the lake

Hiking, backpacking, and camping are among the recreational activities available near the lake. Strawberry Camp, 1.3 miles (2.1 km) downstream from the lake along Strawberry Creek, is connected to the lake by a hiking trail. The trail continues upstream 1.2 miles (1.9 km) from the lake to 40-foot (12 m) Strawberry Falls and then another 0.6 miles (1.0 km) to Little Strawberry Lake. Another trail leads from Strawberry Falls 6.3 miles (10.1 km) to the peak of Strawberry Mountain.

Winter sports enthusiasts visit the lake in winter even though the access road, County Road 60, from Prairie City to the edge of this part of the wilderness is unplowed and blocked by snow 2 to 4 miles (3 to 6 km) downstream from Strawberry Camp. The lake, frozen Strawberry Falls, and Little Strawberry Lake can be reached by cross-country skiers and snowshoers.

Fishing in the lake is allowed all year, though snow makes access difficult in winter. Many brook trout inhabit the lake as well as some rainbow trout, with fish present due to being stocked.

== See also ==
- List of lakes in Oregon

== Works cited ==
- Bishop, Ellen Morris (2003). In Search of Ancient Oregon: A Geological and Natural History. Portland, Oregon: Timber Press. ISBN 978-0-88192-789-4
- Sullivan, William L. (2009). Atlas of Oregon Wilderness. Eugene, Oregon: Navillus Press. ISBN 0-9815701-2-7
