= Elkhorn Mountains (Oregon) =

Mountain range in Oregon, United States

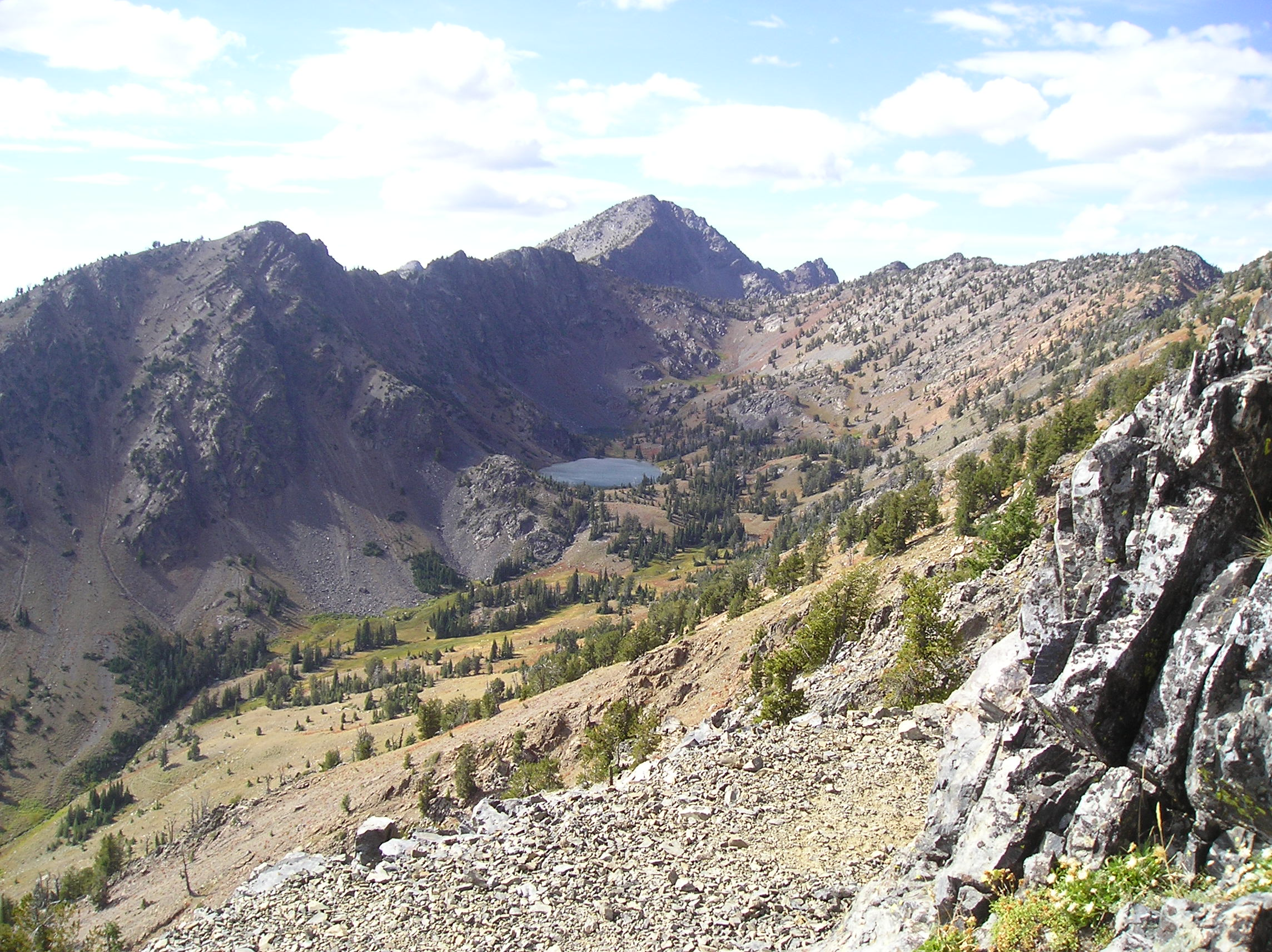
- Twin Lakes and Rock Creek Butte in the background

Highest point
- Peak: Rock Creek Butte, Baker County
- Elevation: 9,106 ft (2,776 m)
- Coordinates: 44°49′00″N 118°06′13″W

Geography
- Location within the United States Location within Oregon
- Country: United States
- State: Oregon
- Counties: Baker, Grant, and Union
- Range coordinates: 44°52′20″N 118°11′34″W
- Topo map: USGS Bourne

The Elkhorn Mountains are a mountain range, part of the Blue Mountains in the northwest United States. Located in northeastern Oregon west of Baker City, the highest point in the range is Rock Creek Butte at 9,106 feet (2,776 m) above sea level.

The range's name was suggested by William H. Taubeneck, emeritus professor of geology at Oregon State University. The Oregon Geographic Names Board initially approved the name of "Elkhorn Range," but a subsequent decision followed Taubeneck's request.

== Recreation ==
Most of the range lies within the Wallowa–Whitman National Forest. Portions of the northern reaches of the Elkhorns are included in a section of the North Fork John Day Wilderness.

=== Hiking ===
The Elkhorn Crest National Recreation Trail runs 23 miles along the spine of the range, from Anthony Lakes in the north to Marble Pass in the south. The northern section of the trail runs in and out of the North Fork John Day Wilderness, between Angell Peak and the junction with the Peavy Trail. Numerous other trails climb to the crest from lower trailheads, accessing lakes and forests that sit beneath the high peaks.

=== Skiing ===
Anthony Lakes ski area is in the range, west of North Powder. The resort offers the highest base elevation of any ski area in Oregon at 7,100 feet and sees an average of 250 inches of snowfall each year.

=== Scenic Driving ===
The Elkhorn Drive Scenic Byway makes a 106-mile loop around the range, starting and ending in Baker City. Traveling counterclockwise, the route follows Oregon Route 7 along the Powder River up to Phillips Lake and then on to the historic gold-mining towns of Sumpter and Granite. The byway arcs north to the North Fork John Day River then heads east to climb to the Anthony Lakes areas before dropping back down into the Baker Valley.

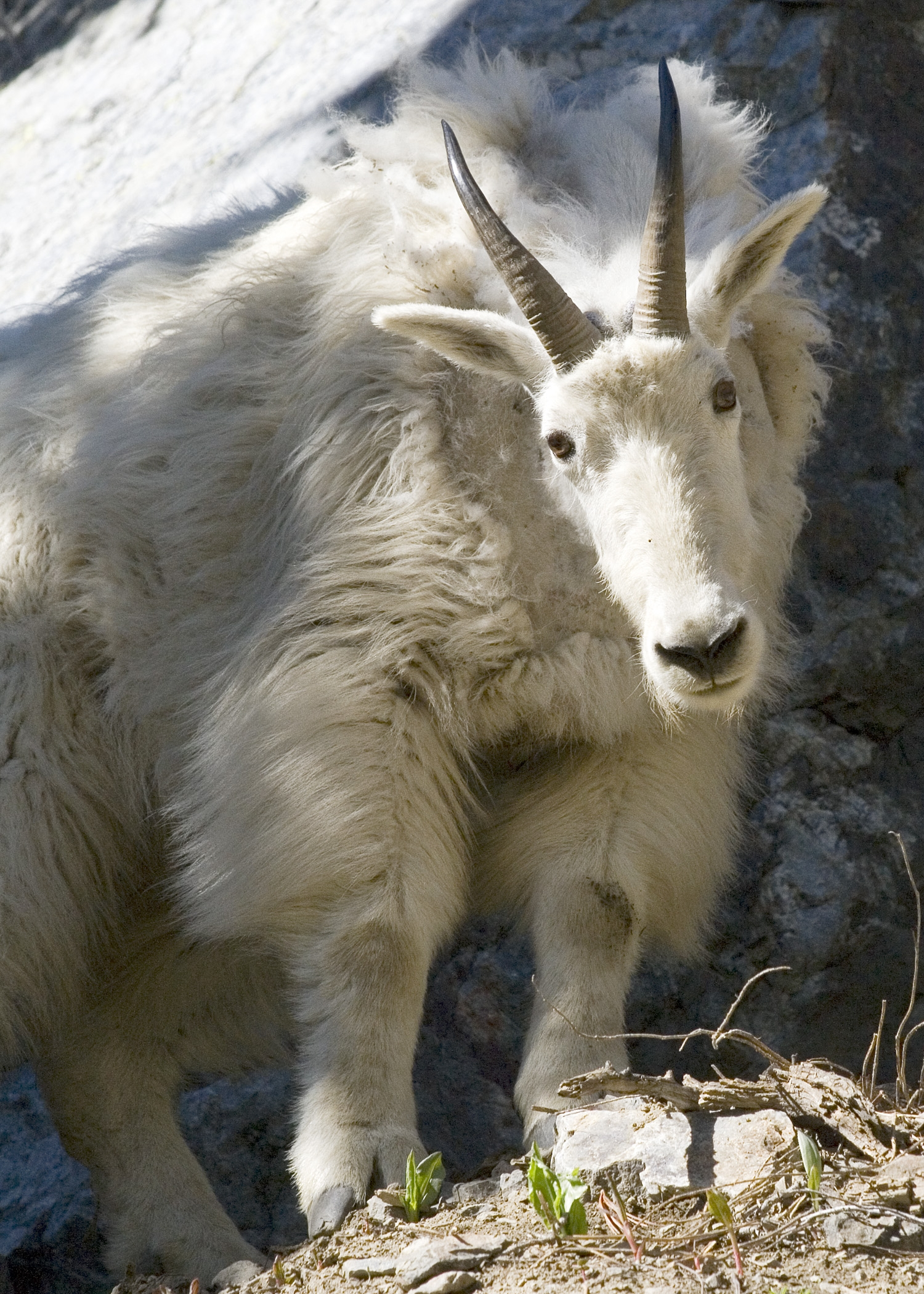
A mountain goat in the Elkhorn Mountains

== See also ==
- List of mountain ranges of Oregon
