= Rock Creek Butte =

Mountain in Oregon, United States

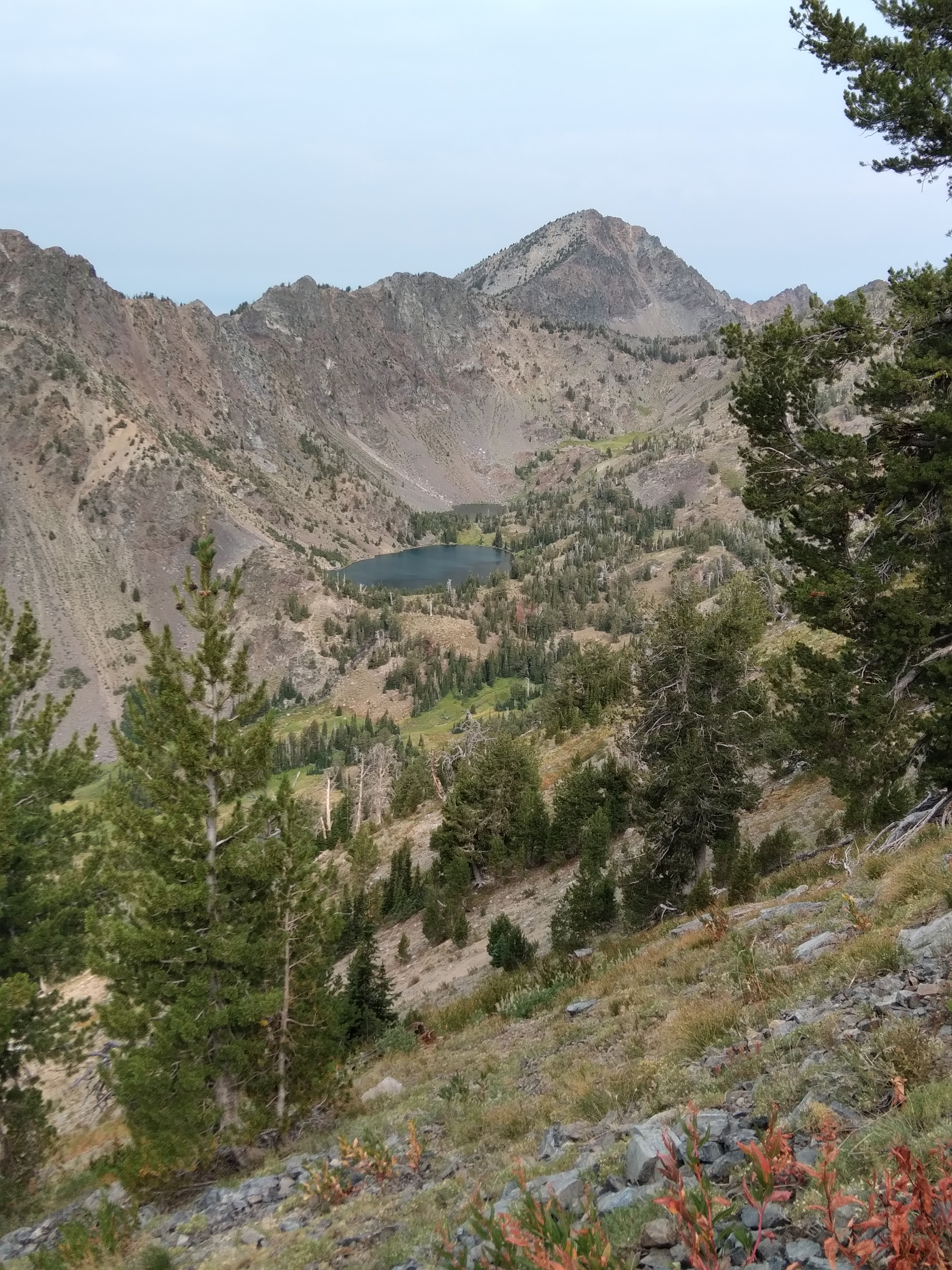
- Rock Creek Butte with Twin Lakes at the cirque

Highest point
- Elevation: 9,106 ft (2,776 m)
- Prominence: 4,466 ft (1,361 m)
- Parent peak: Glacier Mountain
- Isolation: 43.42 mi (69.88 km)
- Coordinates: 44°49′00″N 118°06′13″W

Geography
- Location within Oregon
- Location: Baker County, Oregon

Climbing
- Access: Elkhorn Ridge trail

Rock Creek Butte is a 9,106-foot (2,776 m) summit in Baker County, Oregon, in the United States. It is located in the Wallowa–Whitman National Forest, about 10 miles (16 km) northeast of Sumpter.

Rock Creek Butte is the highest point of the Elkhorn Mountains, and of the greater Blue Mountains, since the Wallowa Mountains are considered separate from the Blue Mountains. At the south slope of the mountain sit two alpine lakes named Twin Lakes while Rock Creek Lake and Bucket Lake lay on the northern slope.

== See also ==
- List of mountain peaks of Oregon
