= Anthony Lakes (ski area) =

Ski area in Oregon, United States

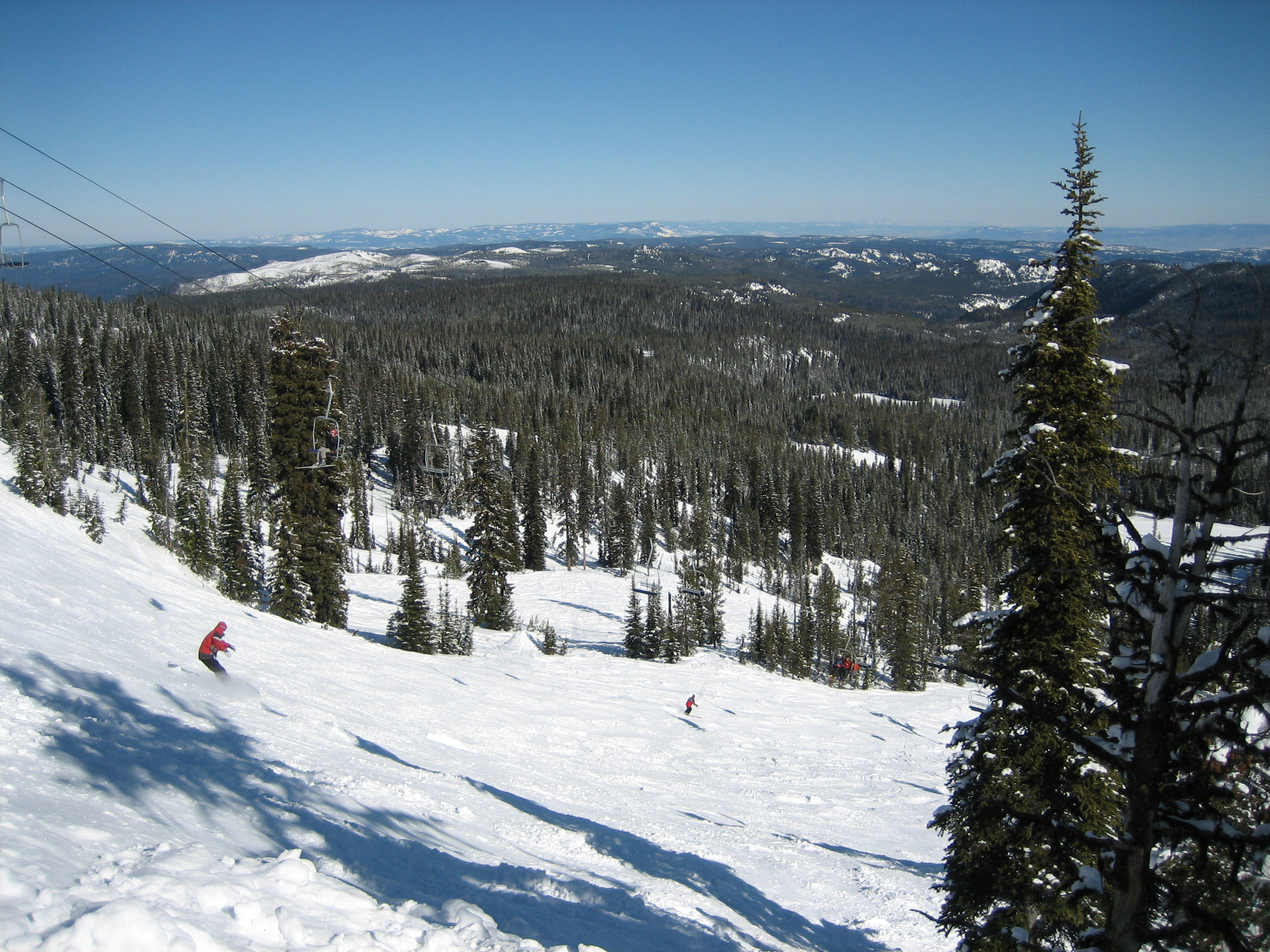
- Anthony Lakes Ski Area in 2008

- Location in the United States Location in Oregon
- Location: Blue Mountains, Baker and Union counties, Oregon, U.S.
- Nearest city: La Grande 45 mi (72 km); Baker City 35 mi (56 km); Boise, (ID) 120 mi (193 km)
- Coordinates: 44.964°N 118.235°W
- Vertical: 900 feet (274 m)
- Top elevation: 8,000 feet (2,438 m)
- Base elevation: 7,100 feet (2,164 m)
- Skiable area: 1,100 acres (4.5 km^{2})
- Trails: 21; 20% easiest 38% more difficult 42% most difficult
- Longest run: 1.5 miles (2.4 km)
- Lift system: 1 triple chair 1 rope tow 1 magic carpet
- Terrain parks: 1
- Snowfall: 300 inches (25 ft; 7.6 m)
- Snowmaking: none
- Night skiing: none
- Website: Anthony Lakes.com

Anthony Lakes is a ski area in the northwest United States, located in northeastern Oregon in the Wallowa–Whitman National Forest west of North Powder. Near the cities of La Grande and Baker City, the resort has one triple chairlift and a vertical drop of 900 feet (274 m). Its summit elevation is 8,000 feet (2,438 m) above sea level and the terrain is mostly of an intermediate and expert level.

The resort also offers snowcat skiing on nearby peaks, and includes a boardercross course as well as a well maintained cross-country (Nordic) ski trails complete with its own Nordic center building. Several backcountry skiing opportunities exist in the nearby area, including Angell Basin.

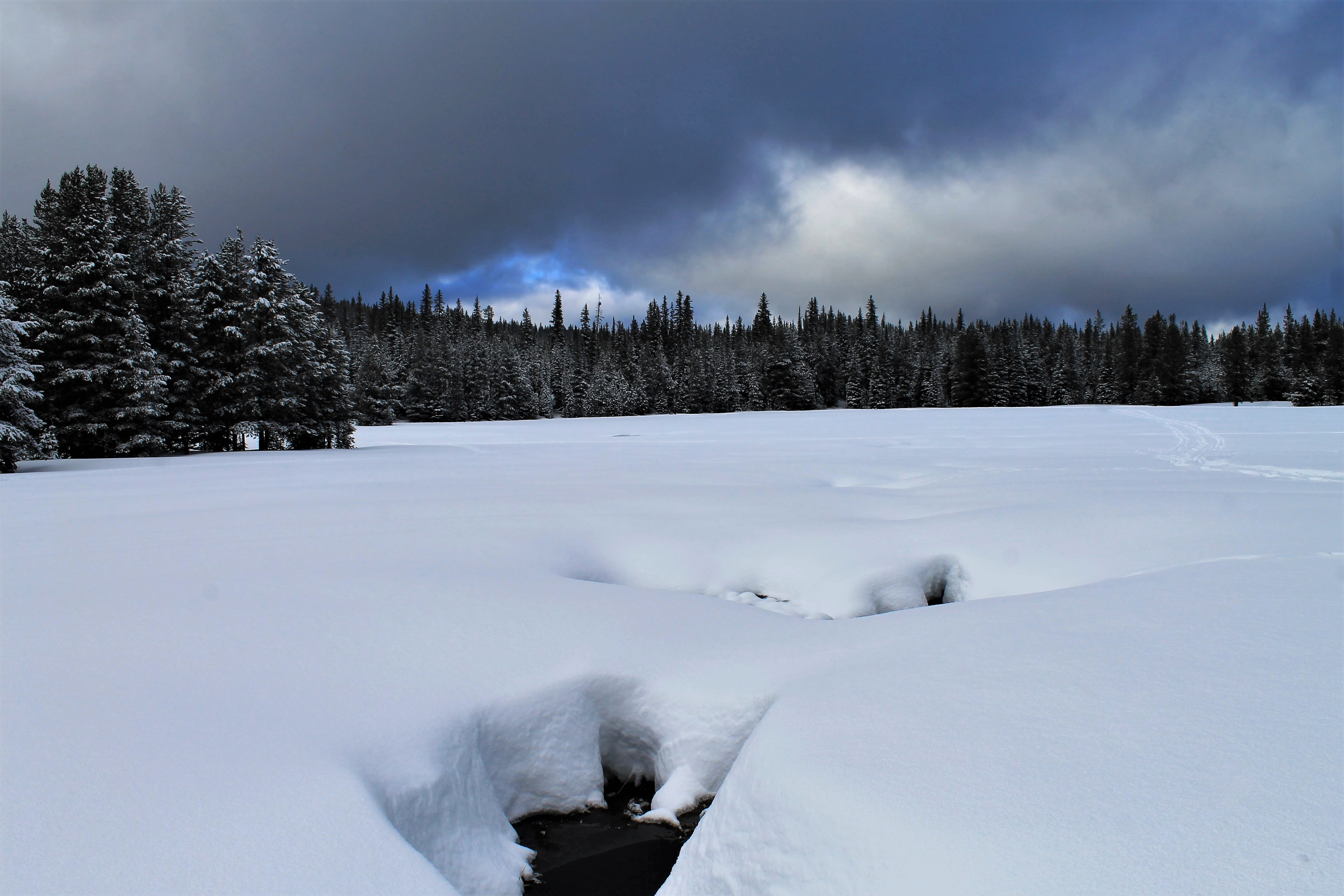
Mud Lake at Anthony Lakes

The ski area resides in the Elkhorn Range of eastern Oregon's Blue Mountains (unrelated to the same named range in southwestern Montana).

== See also ==
- Anthony Lakes (Oregon)
