= Blue Mountain Summit =

Mountain pass in Oregon, US

- Interactive map of Blue Mountain Summit
- Elevation: 5,105 ft (1,556 m)
- Traversed by: US 26

Third Approach
- Location: Baker County, Oregon, United States
- Range: Blue Mountains
- Coordinates: 44°32′53.84″N 118°21′5.43″W

Blue Mountain Summit (el. 5,105 feet (1,556 m)) is a mountain pass in Oregon traversed by U.S. Route 26.
