= Monument Rock Wilderness =

Wilderness area in Oregon, United States

- IUCN category Ib (wilderness area)
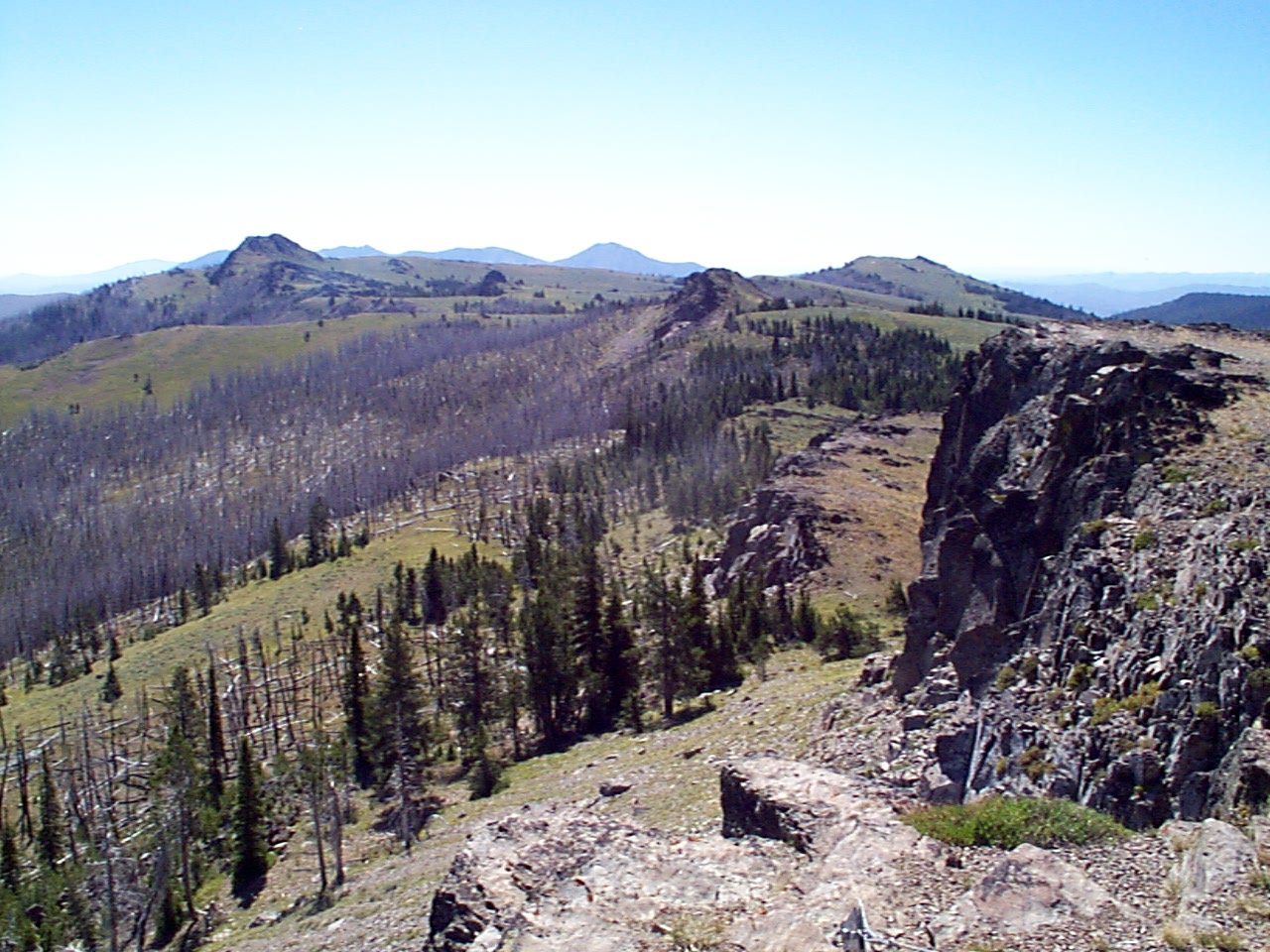
- The landscape of the Monument Rock Wilderness

- Location within the United States
- Location: Baker / Grant counties, Oregon, United States
- Nearest city: Unity, Oregon
- Coordinates: 44°18′35″N 118°18′00″W
- Area: 19,650 acres (7,950 ha)
- Established: 1984
- Governing body: United States Forest Service

The Monument Rock Wilderness Area is a wilderness area within the Malheur and Wallowa–Whitman national forests in the Blue Mountains of eastern Oregon. It was designated by the United States Congress in 1984 and comprises 19,650 acres (7,950 ha). There are approximately 15 miles (24 km) of trails maintained in the wilderness.

== Topography ==
Monument Rock Wilderness ranges in elevation from 5,100 feet (1,554 m) on the Little Malheur River to 7,815 feet (2,382 m) atop Table Rock. The area includes the headwaters of the Little Malheur and the upper drainages of the South Fork of the Burnt River.

== Vegetation ==
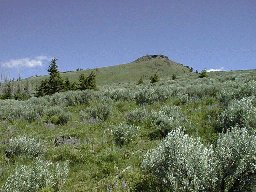
Monument Rock Wilderness

Ponderosa pine, Douglas fir, white fir, lodgepole pine, and quaking aspen cover the moderate slopes of the wilderness, while subalpine fir grow in the higher elevations. Large, grassy meadows also appear throughout the area.

== Wildlife ==
Black bears, deer, elk, and badgers are common in the Monument Rock Wilderness. Seventy species of birds live in the area, including hawks, grouse, and the American dipper. The wilderness is also home to the more elusive wolverine.

== See also ==
- List of Oregon Wildernesses
- List of U.S. Wilderness Areas
- Wilderness Act
