= Malheur National Forest =

National forest in Oregon, United States

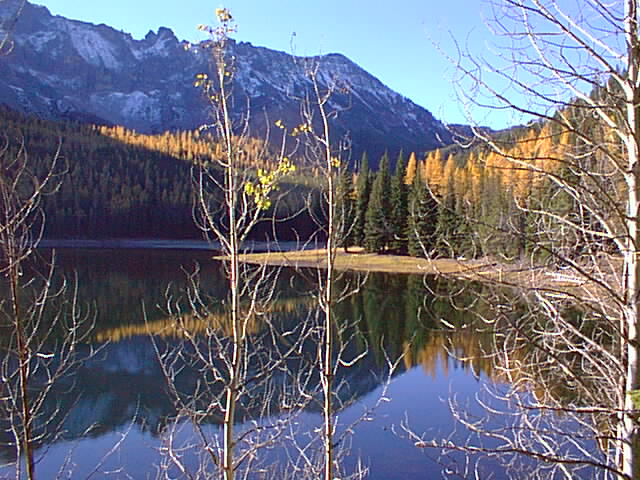
- Strawberry Lake in the Malheur National Forest

- Location within the United States
- Location: Oregon, U.S.
- Nearest city: Canyon City, Oregon
- Coordinates: 44°17′00″N 118°47′04″W
- Area: 1,465,287 acres (5,929.81 km^{2})
- Established: July 1, 1908
- Visitors: 242,000 (in 2006)
- Governing body: U.S. Forest Service
- Website: Malheur National Forest

The Malheur National Forest is a National Forest in the U.S. state of Oregon. It contains more than 1.4 million acres (5,700 km^{2}) in the Blue Mountains of eastern Oregon. The forest consists of high desert grasslands, sage, juniper, pine, fir, and other tree species. Elevations vary from about 4,000 feet (1,200 m) to the 9,038-foot (2,755 m) peak of Strawberry Mountain. The Strawberry Mountains of eastern Oregon extend east to west through the center of the forest. U.S. Route 395 runs south to north through the forest, while U.S. Route 26 runs east to west.

== Overview ==
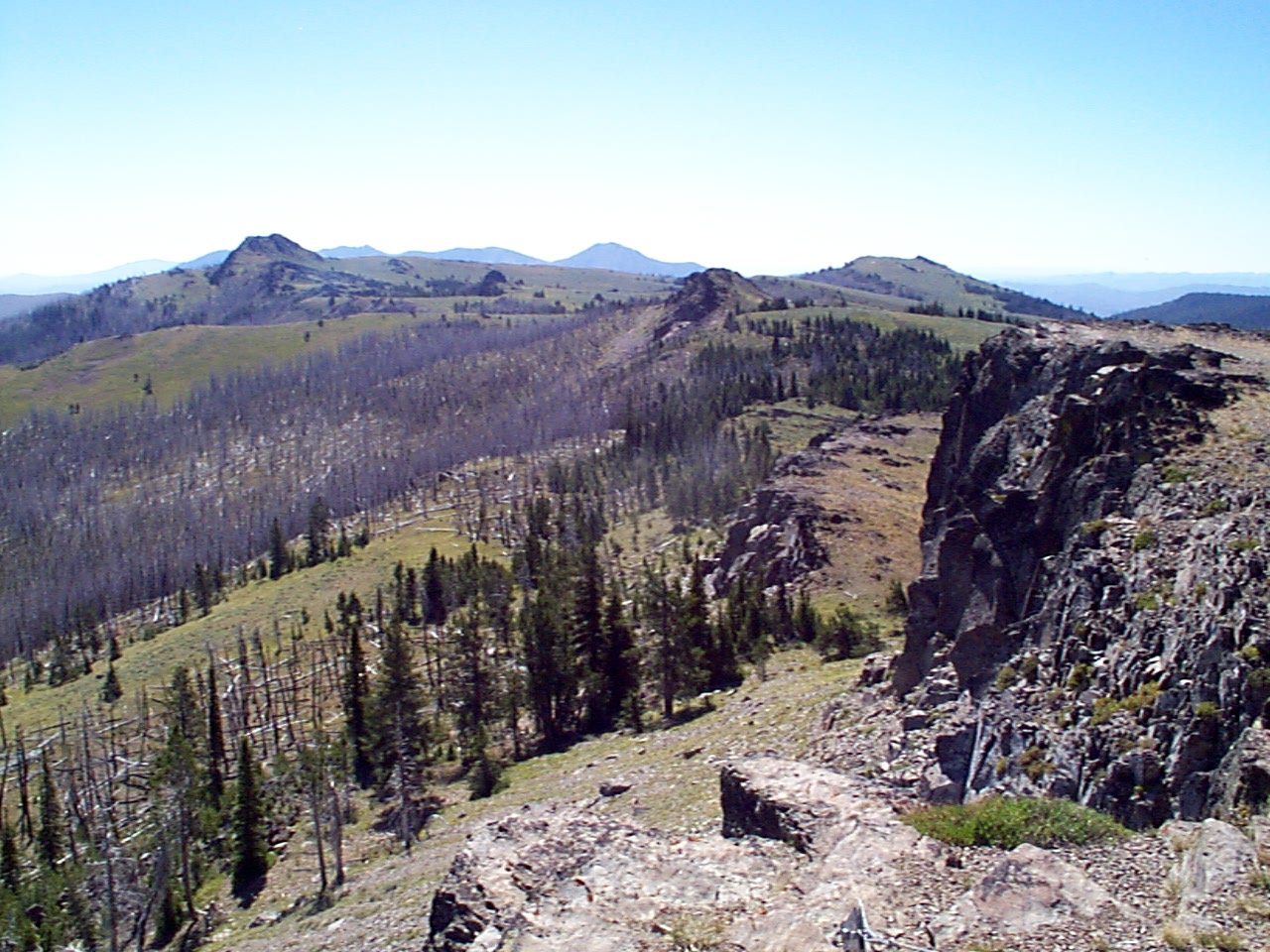
Monument Rock in Malheur NF

The forest was established by President Theodore Roosevelt on June 13, 1908, and is named after the Malheur River, from the French, meaning "misfortune". It is managed by the United States Forest Service for timber extraction, cattle grazing, gold mining and wilderness use. A 1993 Forest Service study estimated the extent of old growth in the forest at 312,000 acres (1,260 km^{2}).

In descending order of land area, the forest is located in parts of Grant, Harney, Baker, and Malheur counties. There are three ranger districts in the forest, with offices in John Day, Prairie City, and Hines.

=== Armillaria—among the largest organisms on earth ===
The Malheur National Forest contains the largest known organism (by area) in the Northern Hemisphere: an Armillaria ostoyae (fungus) that spans 2,200 acres (3.4 mi^{2}; 8.9 km^{2}) and is located high on a ridgeline immediately west of Clear Creek (44.4731°N 118.4816°W).

== Wilderness ==
There are two wilderness areas in the Malheur National Forest.

- Strawberry Mountain Wilderness at 68,700 acres (278 km^{2})
- Monument Rock Wilderness at 19,620 acres (79 km^{2}), located partially within the Wallowa–Whitman National Forest

== Climate ==
The hottest temperature recorded in the Malheur National Forest was 110 °F (43.3 °C) on July 23, 2003, while the coldest temperature recorded was −26 °F (−32.2 °C) on January 22–23, 1962.

Climate data for Malheur Branch Experimental Station, Oregon, 1991–2020 normals, extremes 1942–2022
Month	Jan	Feb	Mar	Apr	May	Jun	Jul	Aug	Sep	Oct	Nov	Dec	Year
Record high °F (°C)	64 (18)	66 (19)	80 (27)	91 (33)	100 (38)	106 (41)	110 (43)	108 (42)	100 (38)	94 (34)	77 (25)	65 (18)	110 (43)
Mean maximum °F (°C)	49.4 (9.7)	57.4 (14.1)	69.3 (20.7)	80.2 (26.8)	89.8 (32.1)	96.3 (35.7)	102.4 (39.1)	100.8 (38.2)	93.6 (34.2)	81.8 (27.7)	64.0 (17.8)	52.4 (11.3)	103.0 (39.4)
Mean daily maximum °F (°C)	37.2 (2.9)	45.1 (7.3)	56.8 (13.8)	64.6 (18.1)	74.1 (23.4)	82.1 (27.8)	92.9 (33.8)	91.5 (33.1)	81.4 (27.4)	66.1 (18.9)	49.0 (9.4)	38.0 (3.3)	64.9 (18.3)
Daily mean °F (°C)	30.4 (−0.9)	35.9 (2.2)	44.6 (7.0)	51.2 (10.7)	60.3 (15.7)	67.6 (19.8)	76.4 (24.7)	74.3 (23.5)	64.5 (18.1)	51.7 (10.9)	38.7 (3.7)	30.6 (−0.8)	52.2 (11.2)
Mean daily minimum °F (°C)	23.5 (−4.7)	26.6 (−3.0)	32.5 (0.3)	37.8 (3.2)	46.6 (8.1)	53.2 (11.8)	59.9 (15.5)	57.1 (13.9)	47.7 (8.7)	37.2 (2.9)	28.5 (−1.9)	23.2 (−4.9)	39.5 (4.2)
Mean minimum °F (°C)	7.7 (−13.5)	14.3 (−9.8)	21.5 (−5.8)	26.0 (−3.3)	33.2 (0.7)	40.9 (4.9)	49.1 (9.5)	46.1 (7.8)	36.2 (2.3)	25.0 (−3.9)	15.3 (−9.3)	9.6 (−12.4)	1.6 (−16.9)
Record low °F (°C)	−26 (−32)	−24 (−31)	5 (−15)	18 (−8)	25 (−4)	30 (−1)	36 (2)	37 (3)	25 (−4)	10 (−12)	−6 (−21)	−21 (−29)	−26 (−32)
Average precipitation inches (mm)	1.44 (37)	0.97 (25)	1.04 (26)	0.91 (23)	1.29 (33)	0.78 (20)	0.24 (6.1)	0.20 (5.1)	0.41 (10)	0.82 (21)	1.00 (25)	1.56 (40)	10.66 (271.2)
Average snowfall inches (cm)	6.1 (15)	2.3 (5.8)	0.5 (1.3)	0.0 (0.0)	0.0 (0.0)	0.0 (0.0)	0.0 (0.0)	0.0 (0.0)	0.0 (0.0)	0.0 (0.0)	1.1 (2.8)	5.4 (14)	15.4 (38.9)
Average precipitation days (≥ 0.01 in)	10.6	8.4	10.7	9.4	8.3	6.4	2.3	2.6	3.4	7.0	10.4	11.3	90.8
Average snowy days (≥ 0.1 in)	3.8	1.9	0.5	0.0	0.0	0.0	0.0	0.0	0.0	0.1	1.0	3.9	11.2
Source 1: NOAA
Source 2: National Weather Service

== See also ==
- Vinegar Hill-Indian Rock Scenic Area, a high-elevation scenic area in the northeast portion of the forest
- Malheur National Wildlife Refuge, a federally protected refuge to the south of the forest
- List of national forests of the United States
