= Strawberry Mountain (Oregon) =

Mountain in Oregon, United States

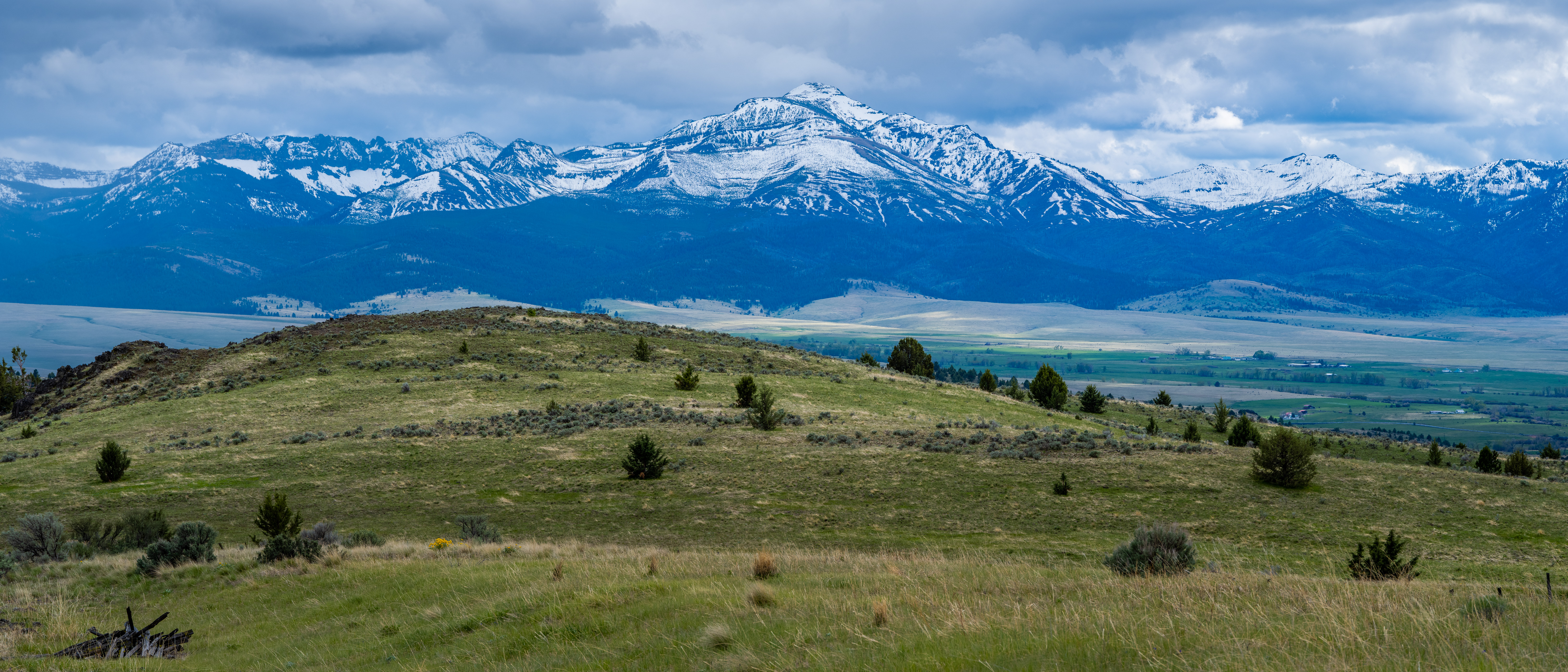
- Strawberry Mountain Peak

Highest point
- Elevation: 9,042 ft (2,756 m) NAVD 88
- Prominence: 4,080 ft (1,244 m)
- Listing: Oregon county high points
- Coordinates: 44°18′44″N 118°43′00″W

Geography
- Location: Grant County, Oregon, United States
- Parent range: Strawberry Mountains
- Topo map: USGS Strawberry Mountain

Geology
- Mountain type: Volcano
- Last eruption: 12.5 million years ago

Strawberry Mountain is the highest peak in the Strawberry Mountains of eastern Oregon in the United States. It is the 30th highest point in Oregon. It is in the Malheur National Forest and is the most prominent feature of the Strawberry Mountain Wilderness.

== History ==
The mountain, and nearby Strawberry Creek, were named by homesteader Nathan Willis Fisk "because there were wild strawberries in abundance there..." It was originally named "Strawberry Butte", but common usage changed it to Strawberry Mountain, which now appears on official maps.

== Geology ==
Strawberry Mountain lies atop a bed of volcanics and marine sediment deposited during the Early Jurassic period. This region was later accreted to the North American Plate. The granite that forms the nearby Aldrich Mountains intruded into that region during the Early Cretaceous period. That event formed gold veins throughout the greater Blue Mountain region. This intrusion was followed by periods of regional volcanism and erosion, representing the last 60 million years.

Basalt deposits from the Columbia River Basalt Group almost entirely surround the base of Strawberry Mountain. The current edifice is made up of andesitic volcanic material erupted locally about 16 to 14 million years ago, a timeframe that overlaps with the most active period of the Columbia River Basalt Group. This material is typically referred to as the Strawberry Volcanics. Despite having a different chemical composition, some evidence shows that the Strawberry Volcanics are related to the Columbia River Basalt Group. About 100 km^{3} (24 mi^{3}) of material is estimated to have erupted.

Other volcanoes are believed to have existed near the Strawberry Volcanics around the same time period they were active. This region is inferred to have had similar topography to the Oregon Cascades today. Compression on the north-south axis occurred after these volcanoes became extinct. Erosion by streams and ice age glaciation exposed the inner workings of this volcano as well as early eruptive material.

Glaciation also widened existing drainages to create U-shaped valleys into the mountains. Some of these valleys hold alpine lakes. Much of the material eroded from Strawberry Mountain now lies as gravel in part of the John Day River Valley and is known as the Rattlesnake Formation. Overlying this gravel is a 100 feet (30 m) thick volcanic ash bed. The fossilized remains of several animals ranging from the Eocene to the Miocene are preserved within the Rattlesnake Formation, including several now-extinct species of horse such as Eohippus and Merychippus.
