= North Powder, Oregon =

- City
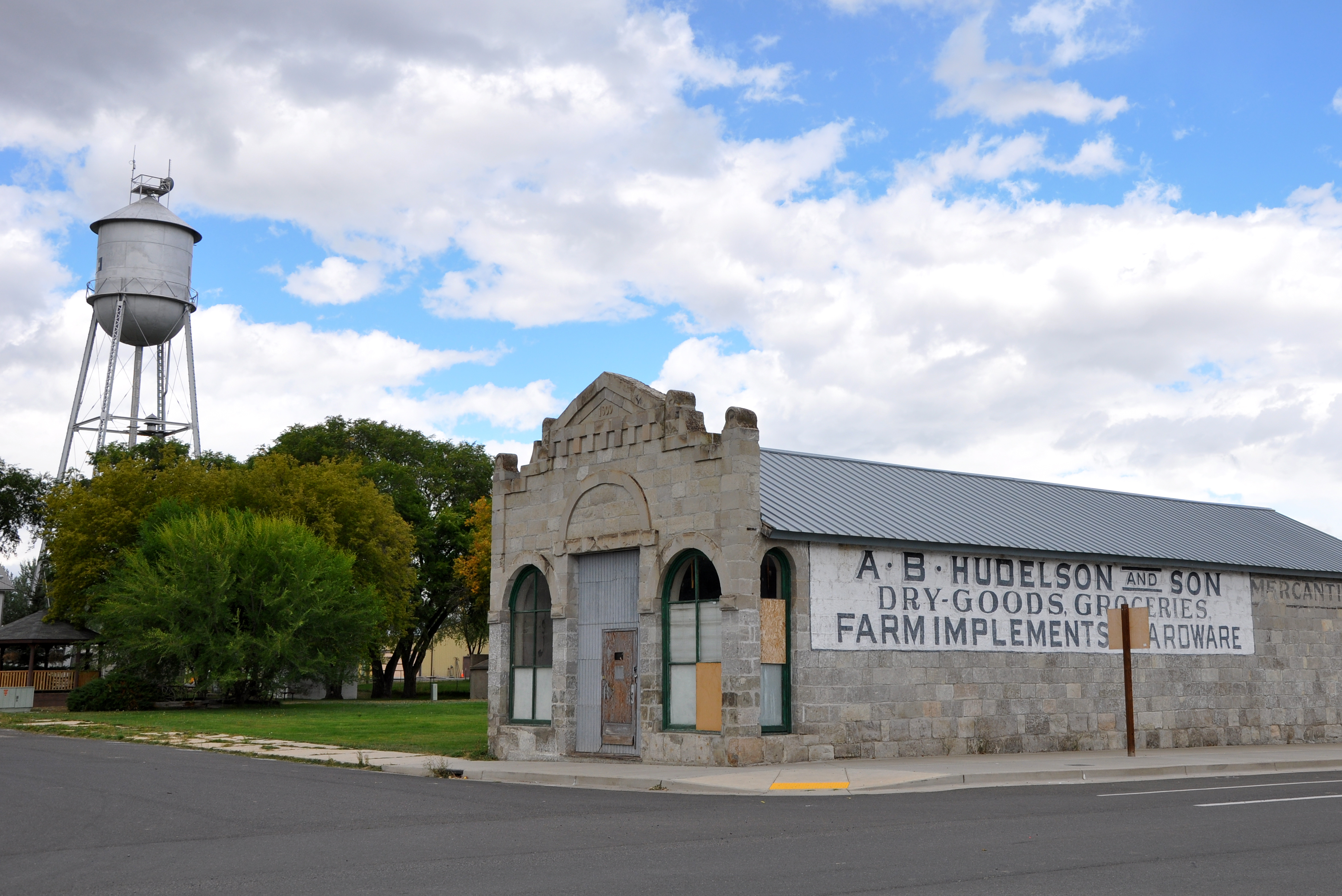
- Building in downtown North Powder

- Location in Oregon
- Coordinates: 45°01′48″N 117°55′13″W
- Country: United States
- State: Oregon
- County: Union
- Incorporated: 1903

Government
  - Mayor: Bonita Hebert

Area
  - Total: 0.63 sq mi (1.63 km^{2})
  - Land: 0.63 sq mi (1.63 km^{2})
  - Water: 0 sq mi (0.00 km^{2})
- Elevation: 3,265 ft (995 m)

Population (2020)
  - Total: 504
  - Density: 803.1/sq mi (310.07/km^{2})
- Time zone: UTC-8 (Pacific)
  - Summer (DST): UTC-7 (Pacific)
- ZIP code: 97867
- Area code: 541
- FIPS code: 41-53300
- GNIS feature ID: 2411277
- Website: northpowderoregon.org

North Powder is a city in Union County, Oregon, United States. As of the 2020 census, North Powder had a population of 504.

== History ==
North Powder was platted in 1885 or 1886 along the Oregon Railroad and Navigation Company rail line, having been a stage stop before then.

David Eccles, a Mormon businessman, created the Hall Brothers Lumber Company in the town once the railway arrived.

North Powder prospered because it had an icehouse that supplied the refrigerator cars of Pacific Fruit Express until the icehouse burned down in the 1930s.

== Geography ==
According to the United States Census Bureau, the city has a total area of 0.64 square miles (1.66 km^{2}), all of it land.

=== Climate ===
This region experiences warm (but not hot) and dry summers, with no average monthly temperatures above 71.6 °F (22.0 °C). According to the Köppen Climate Classification system, North Powder has a warm-summer Mediterranean climate, abbreviated "Csb" on climate maps.

== Demographics ==
Historical population
Census	Pop.	Note	%±
1890	185		—
1910	455		—
1920	613		34.7%
1930	553		−9.8%
1940	376		−32.0%
1950	403		7.2%
1960	399		−1.0%
1970	304		−23.8%
1980	430		41.4%
1990	448		4.2%
2000	489		9.2%
2010	439		−10.2%
2020	504		14.8%
U.S. Decennial Census

=== 2020 census ===
As of the 2020 census, North Powder had a population of 504, the median age was 43.3 years, 27.0% of residents were under the age of 18, 22.4% were 65 years of age or older, and there were 92.4 males for every 100 females and 92.7 males for every 100 females age 18 and over.

As of the 2020 census, 0% of residents lived in urban areas and 100.0% lived in rural areas.

As of the 2020 census, there were 203 households in North Powder, of which 32.0% had children under the age of 18 living in them, 46.8% were married-couple households, 21.7% were households with a male householder and no spouse or partner present, 28.1% were households with a female householder and no spouse or partner present, about 29.6% were made up of individuals, and 14.8% had someone living alone who was 65 years of age or older.

As of the 2020 census, there were 225 housing units, of which 9.8% were vacant, 71.9% of occupied units were owner-occupied, 28.1% were renter-occupied, the homeowner vacancy rate was 0.7%, and the rental vacancy rate was <0.1%.

Racial composition as of the 2020 census
Race	Number	Percent
White	437	86.7%
Black or African American	2	0.4%
American Indian and Alaska Native	1	0.2%
Asian	3	0.6%
Native Hawaiian and Other Pacific Islander	0	0%
Some other race	15	3.0%
Two or more races	46	9.1%
Hispanic or Latino (of any race)	33	6.5%

=== 2010 census ===
As of the census of 2010, there were 439 people, 184 households, and 111 families living in the city. The population density was 685.9 inhabitants per square mile (264.8/km^{2}). There were 214 housing units at an average density of 334.4 per square mile (129.1/km^{2}). The racial makeup of the city was 92.5% White, 0.5% African American, 1.6% Native American, 0.5% Asian, 2.3% from other races, and 2.7% from two or more races. Hispanic or Latino of any race were 8.9% of the population.

There were 184 households, of which 27.2% had children under the age of 18 living with them, 50.5% were married couples living together, 7.6% had a female householder with no husband present, 2.2% had a male householder with no wife present, and 39.7% were non-families. 31.5% of all households were made up of individuals, and 10.9% had someone living alone who was 65 years of age or older. The average household size was 2.39 and the average family size was 3.10.

The median age in the city was 43.1 years. 26.4% of residents were under the age of 18; 3.7% were between the ages of 18 and 24; 21.2% were from 25 to 44; 31.4% were from 45 to 64; and 17.3% were 65 years of age or older. The gender makeup of the city was 48.1% male and 51.9% female.

=== 2000 census ===
As of the census of 2000, there were 489 people, 184 households, and 130 families living in the city. The population density was 797.7 inhabitants per square mile (308.0/km^{2}). There were 209 housing units at an average density of 340.9 per square mile (131.6/km^{2}). The racial makeup of the city was 96.32% White, 0.61% African American, 0.61% Native American, 0.41% Asian, 0.20% Pacific Islander, and 1.84% from two or more races. Hispanic or Latino of any race were 3.07% of the population.

There were 184 households, out of which 32.1% had children under the age of 18 living with them, 56.5% were married couples living together, 9.2% had a female householder with no husband present, and 29.3% were non-families. 25.0% of all households were made up of individuals, and 10.9% had someone living alone who was 65 years of age or older. The average household size was 2.66 and the average family size was 3.11.

In the city, the population was spread out, with 30.3% under the age of 18, 5.1% from 18 to 24, 26.0% from 25 to 44, 22.3% from 45 to 64, and 16.4% who were 65 years of age or older. The median age was 39 years. For every 100 females, there were 97.2 males. For every 100 females age 18 and over, there were 93.8 males.

The median income for a household in the city was $24,167, and the median income for a family was $27,188. Males had a median income of $27,500 versus $19,063 for females. The per capita income for the city was $11,231. About 22.1% of families and 25.9% of the population were below the poverty line, including 39.6% of those under age 18 and 12.1% of those age 65 or over.

== Recreation ==
Anthony Lakes ski area is west of North Powder, in the Elkhorn Mountains and Wallowa–Whitman National Forest.

== Education ==
It is within North Powder School District 8J.

Union County is not in the boundary of any community college district.

== Notable people ==
- Margaret Rayburn, educator, member of the Washington House of Representatives
