= Strawberry Mountain Wilderness =

Wilderness area of the Strawberry Mountain Range in east Oregon

- IUCN category Ib (wilderness area)
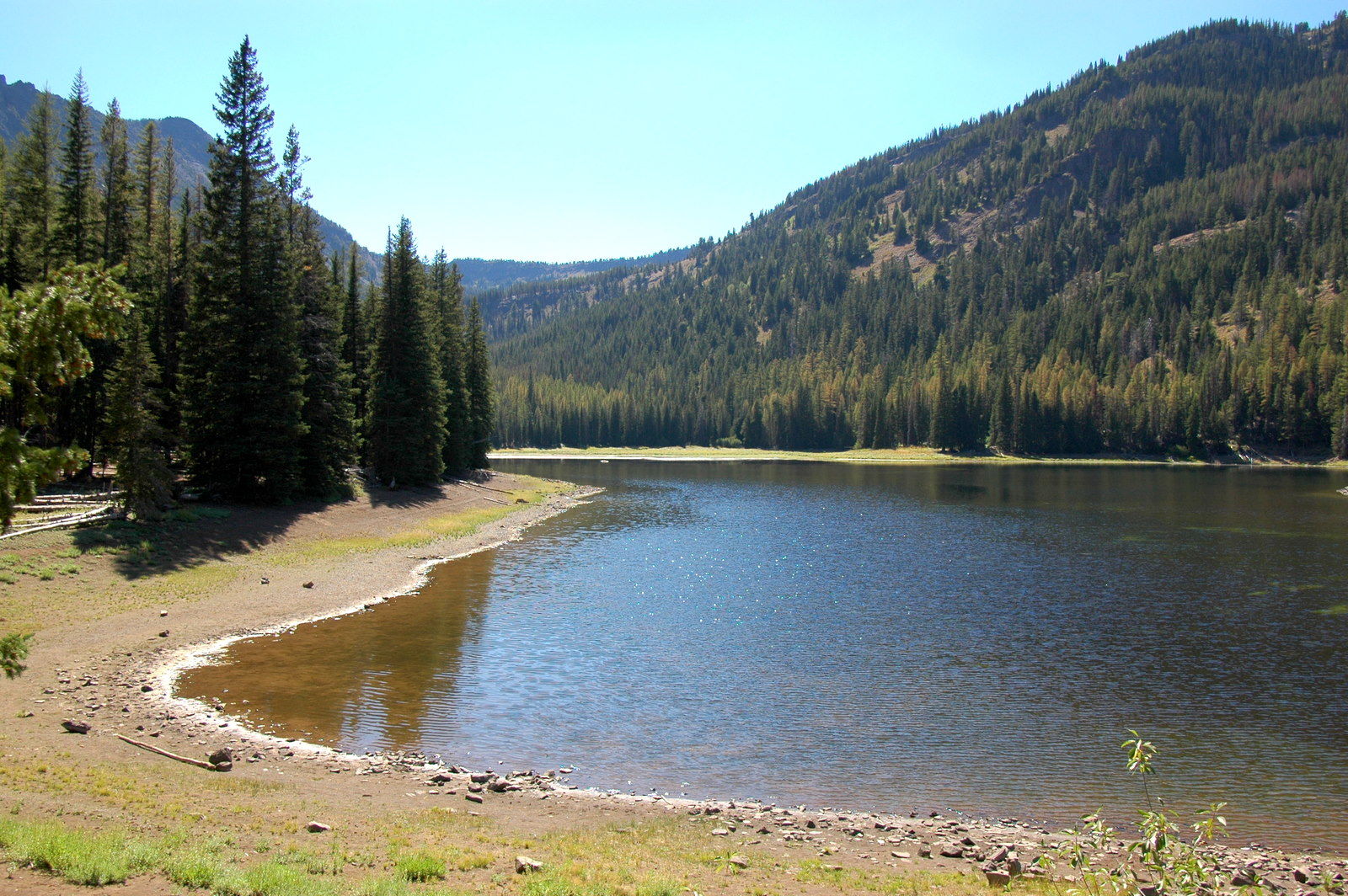
- Strawberry Lake
- Interactive map of Strawberry Mountain Wilderness
- Location: Grant County, Oregon, United States
- Nearest city: Canyon City and Prairie City
- Coordinates: 44°18′10″N 118°47′36″W
- Area: 69,350 acres (28,060 ha)
- Established: 1964
- Governing body: United States Forest Service

Strawberry Mountain Wilderness is a wilderness area of the Strawberry Mountain Range, within Malheur National Forest in the Blue Mountains of east Oregon. The area comprises 69,350 acres (28,060 ha), including mountain peaks and several lakes, and contains more than 125 miles (201 km) of hiking trails. Strawberry Mountain was designated wilderness under the Wilderness Act of 1964, and in 1984 more than doubled in size with the passage of the Oregon Wilderness Act. It is managed by the United States Forest Service.

== Topography ==
Strawberry Mountain Wilderness ranges in elevation from 4,000 feet (1,219 m) to 9,038 feet (2,755 m), at the summit of Strawberry Mountain, and contains five of the seven major life zones in North America. There are seven alpine lakes in the wilderness, including Strawberry Lake, High Lake, and Slide Lake. It also contains the headwaters of numerous streams, including Pine, Indian, Strawberry, Canyon, Bear, Lake, Wall, Roberts, and Big Creek. Strawberry Creek includes the 40-foot (12 m) Strawberry Falls.

== Geology ==
The basement geology of the Strawberry Mountain Wilderness is a Permian-age ophiolite complex consisting of a sequence of ultramafic, mafic, and silicic igneous rocks, interpreted to have formed as deep crustal rocks near an intra-oceanic island arc system. The sequence is distinctive from other Permo-Triassic ophiolite-type complexes in Western North America by its large volume of silicic intrusive and volcanic rocks. By the mid-Triassic, this complex had been heavily fragmented, uplifted, and overlain by Triassic-age oceanic sediments. All of these Permo-Triassic rocks were incorporated onto the western margin of North America by the mid-Cretaceous. Extensive Tertiary-age continental volcanic flows covered the region, and subsequent uplift and erosion has exposed the older basement. More recently, glaciation carved U-shaped valleys and hollowed out beds that today hold seven alpine lakes.

== Vegetation ==
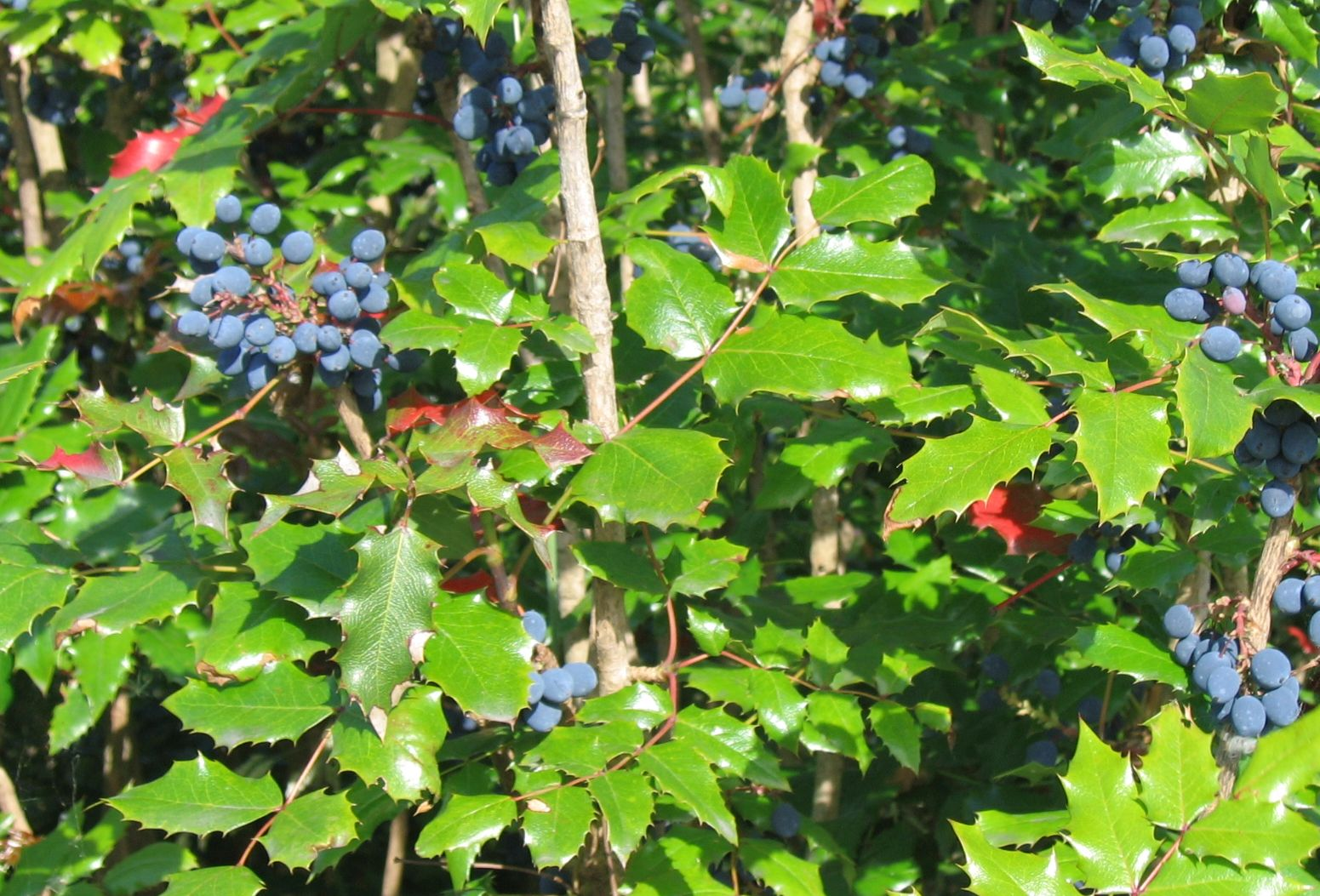
Oregon grape (Mahonia aquifolium)

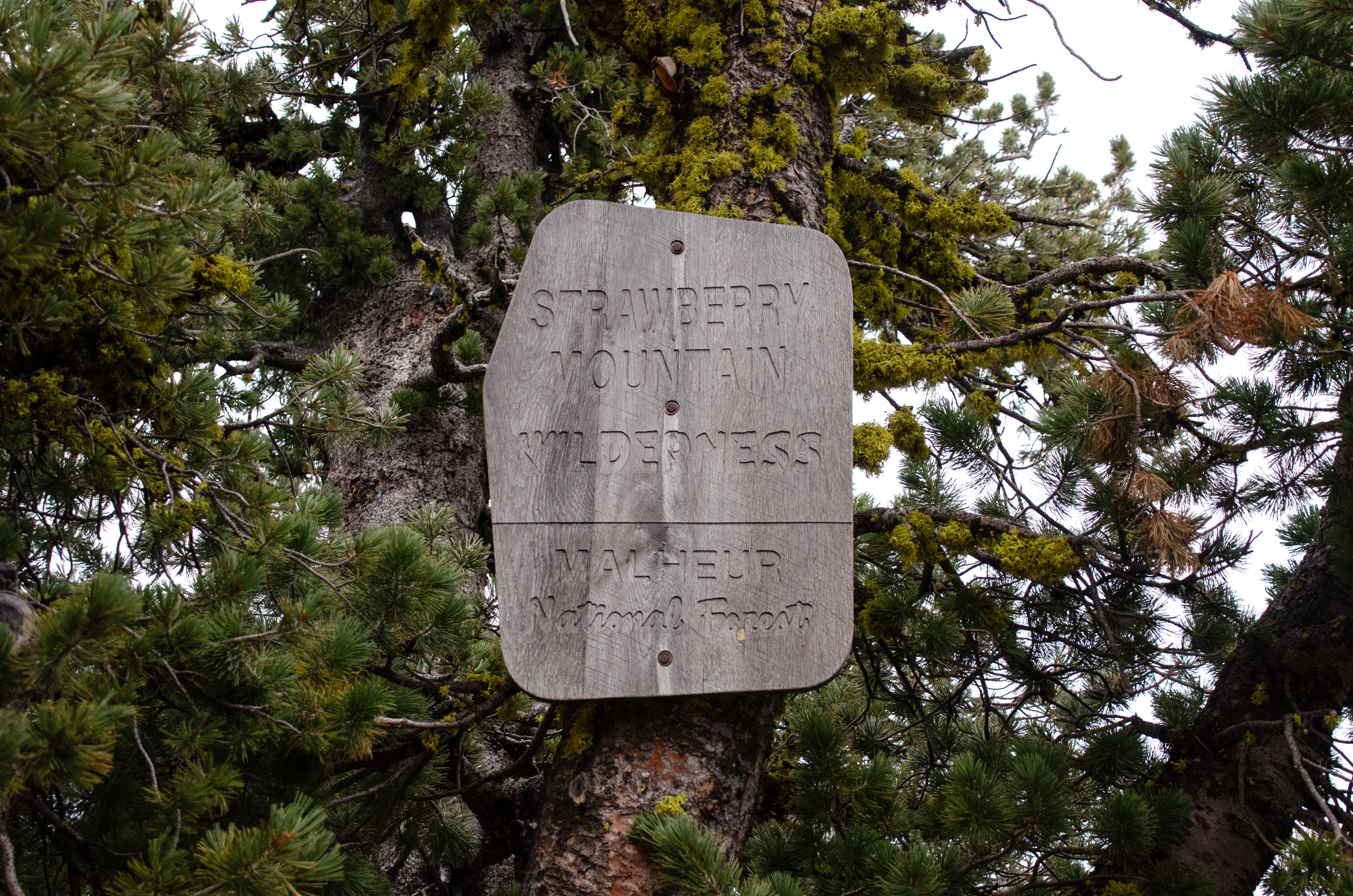
Sign marking the boundary of the Strawberry Mountain Wilderness near Indian Spring Butte

Strawberry Mountain Wilderness contains a large number of larch trees, as well as spruce, fir, and pine forests. Common flowers in the Wilderness include buttercups, mariposa lily, shooting star, paintbrush, wild onion, yarrow, and western Jacob's ladder. Other abundant vegetation includes wild strawberry, grouseberry, thinleaf huckleberry, Oregon grape, swamp gooseberry, thimbleberry, and Sitka alder.

== Wildlife ==
Strawberry Mountain Wilderness is home to at least 378 kinds of animals and 22 species of fish. These include Rocky Mountain elk, mule deer, antelope, black bear, cougar, mountain goat, bighorn sheep, ruffed and blue grouse, pileated woodpecker, sharp-shinned hawk, bald eagle, pine marten, mink, and beaver. Some species of fish in the Middle Fork of the Malheur River include bull trout, Great Basin redband trout, and rainbow trout.

== See also ==
- List of Oregon Wildernesses
- List of U.S. Wilderness Areas
- Malheur River
