= North Fork John Day Wilderness =

Wilderness area in Oregon, United States

- IUCN category Ib (wilderness area)
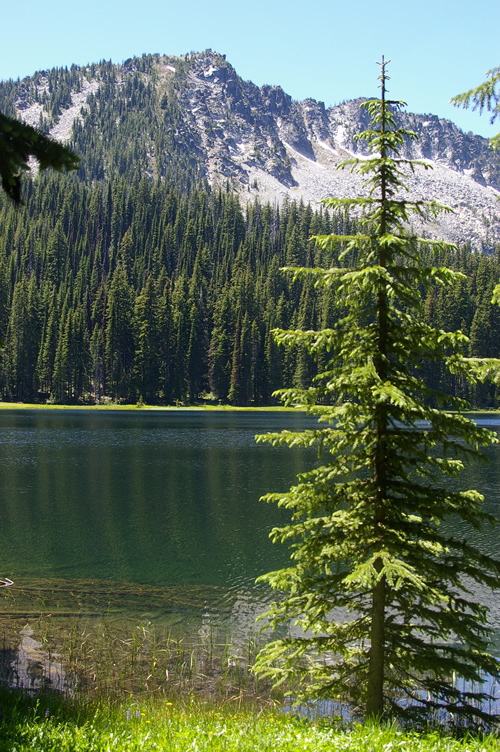
- A lake in the wilderness

- Location within the United States
- Location: Grant / Umatilla counties, Oregon, United States
- Nearest city: Granite, Oregon
- Coordinates: 44°55′01″N 118°35′03″W
- Area: 121,352 acres (49,109 ha)
- Established: 1984
- Governing body: United States Forest Service

The North Fork John Day Wilderness is a wilderness area within the Umatilla and Wallowa–Whitman National Forests in the Blue Mountains of northeastern Oregon.

The wilderness consists of four separate units: the main 85,000-acre (34,000 ha) unit of the North Fork John Day drainage; the Greenhorn Unit to the south; the Tower Mountain Unit to the north; and the Baldy Creek Unit to the east. Approximately 6,000 acres (2,400 ha) of the Vinegar Hill-Indian Rock Scenic Area also lie within the wilderness.

The North Fork John Day Wilderness is located within the larger Elkhorn Fire Management Area, and the area's fire plan allows for the use of Prescribed Natural Fire under certain circumstances.

== Topography ==
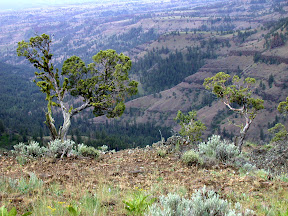
Vegetation in the wilderness

The North Fork John Day Wilderness is composed of rolling benchlands, steep ridges, alpine lake basins, and the granite outcrops of the Greenhorn Mountains at an elevation of 8,100 feet (2,500 m). It encompasses two entire subranges of the Blue Mountains—the Greenhorn Mountains and the ragged Elkhorn Mountains. A continuous vegetative canopy covers most of the land, including dense virgin stands of conifer species like Douglas-fir, white fir, western larch and lodgepole pine. The headwaters of several waterways are located in the wilderness, including Bull Creek, Baldy Creek, and Crawfish Creek, as well as the North Fork John Day River, 39 miles (63 km) of which are designated Wild and Scenic.

== Geology ==
The granite and sedimentary rock that makes up much of the North Fork John Day Wilderness reflect the Blue Mountains' history as a volcanic island archipelago in the Pacific Ocean some 250 million years ago. As the crust of the earth shifted, the archipelago collided with the advancing North American Plate approximately 200 million years ago. Later, bubbles of less dense granitic rock, or batholiths, rose through the sediment to form the granite cores of the Elkhorn and Greenhorn ranges. Columbia River basalt flows buried the region some 15 million years ago, the remains of which can be seen today in the rimrock on the benchlands in the western portion of the wilderness.

== History ==
The North Fork John Day drainage bustled with gold and silver mining operations in the mid-19th century, and traces of the thousands of miners who labored here are still visible. Old mining structures, building foundations, and dredged ditches and trash dumps left behind by the miners are all visible. Many of these features are being left in place to naturally disappear over time, consistent with the Wilderness Act's purpose to have no permanent human works in wilderness areas. The Sumpter Valley Gold Dredge once excavated the riverbeds in the area, and is now restored as a state heritage site in Sumpter.

== Wildlife ==
The North Fork John Day Wilderness is known for its big game and anadromous fish habitat. Dominant wildlife species include Rocky Mountain elk and mule deer. There is currently an elk herd estimated to number beyond 50,000 and a herd of mule deer that reportedly exceeds 150,000. Bull elk here sometimes weigh more than 800 pounds (360 kg) and sport antlers spreading beyond 5 feet (1.5 m). There are over 130 miles (210 km) of perennial streams in the wilderness, 40 miles (64 km) of which provide spawning habitat for chinook salmon and steelhead. Other wildlife in the North Fork John Day Wilderness include mountain goats and black bears.

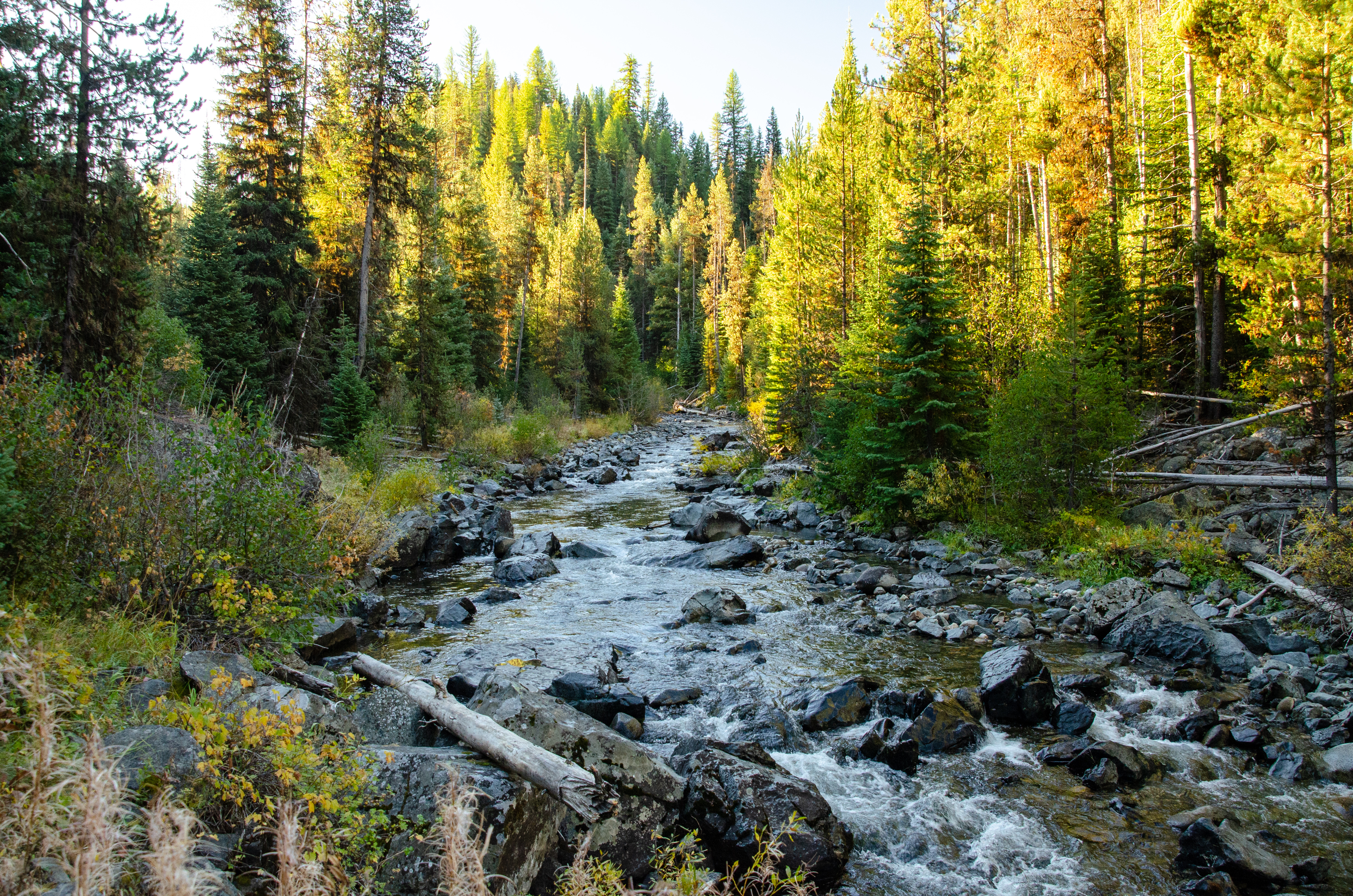
North Fork John Day River

== Recreation ==
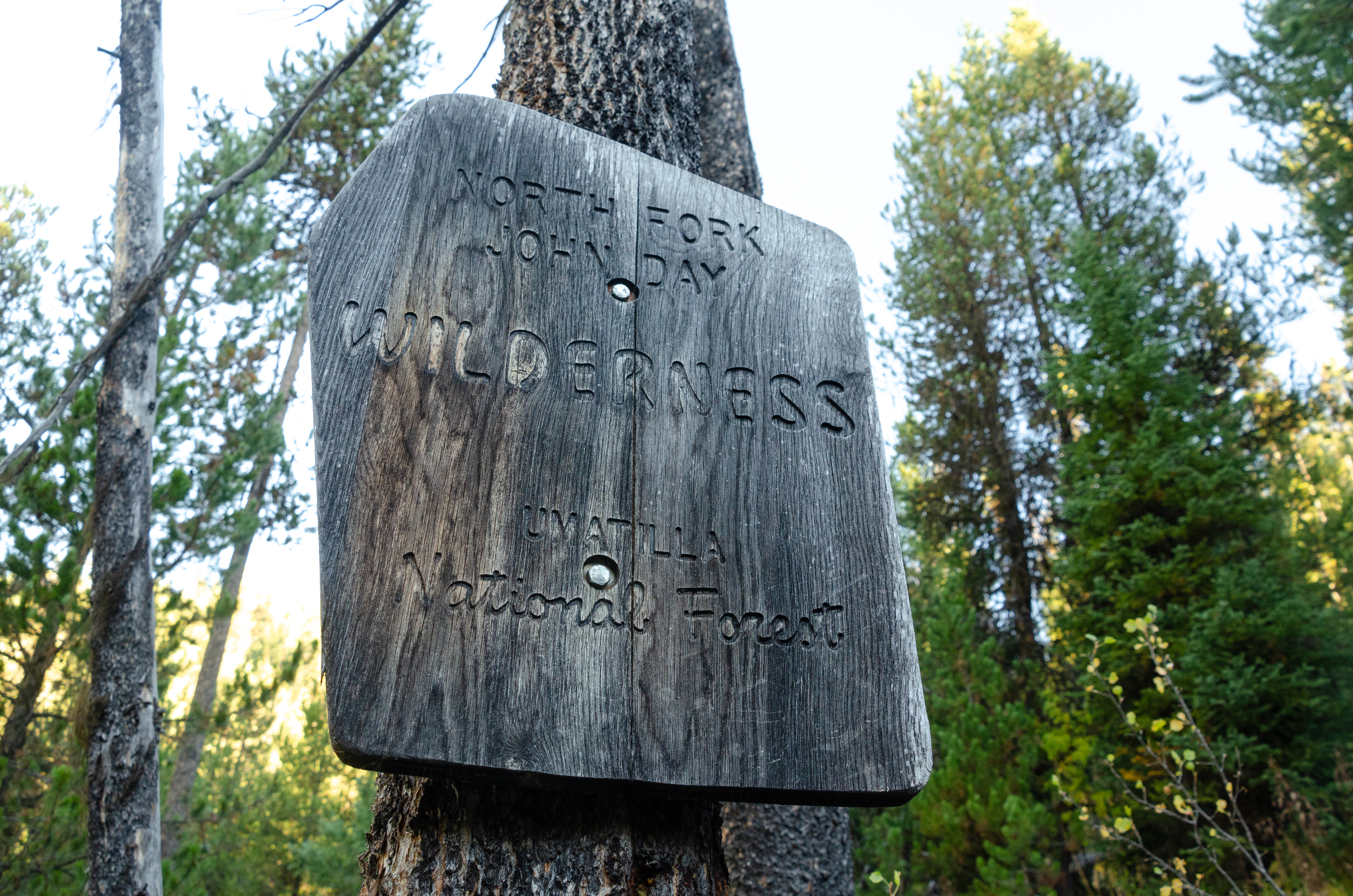
Sign marking the wilderness boundary

Primary recreational activities in the North Fork John Day Wilderness are hiking, camping, horseback riding, hunting, fishing, cross-country skiing, rafting, kayaking, wildlife watching, and rock climbing the granite cliffs of the Elkhorn Mountains. There are roughly 133 miles (214 km) of hiking trails in the wilderness, three of which are National Recreation Trails.

== See also ==
- List of Oregon Wildernesses
- List of U.S. Wilderness Areas
