= Blue Mountains (Pacific Northwest) =

Mountain range in Oregon and Washington, United States

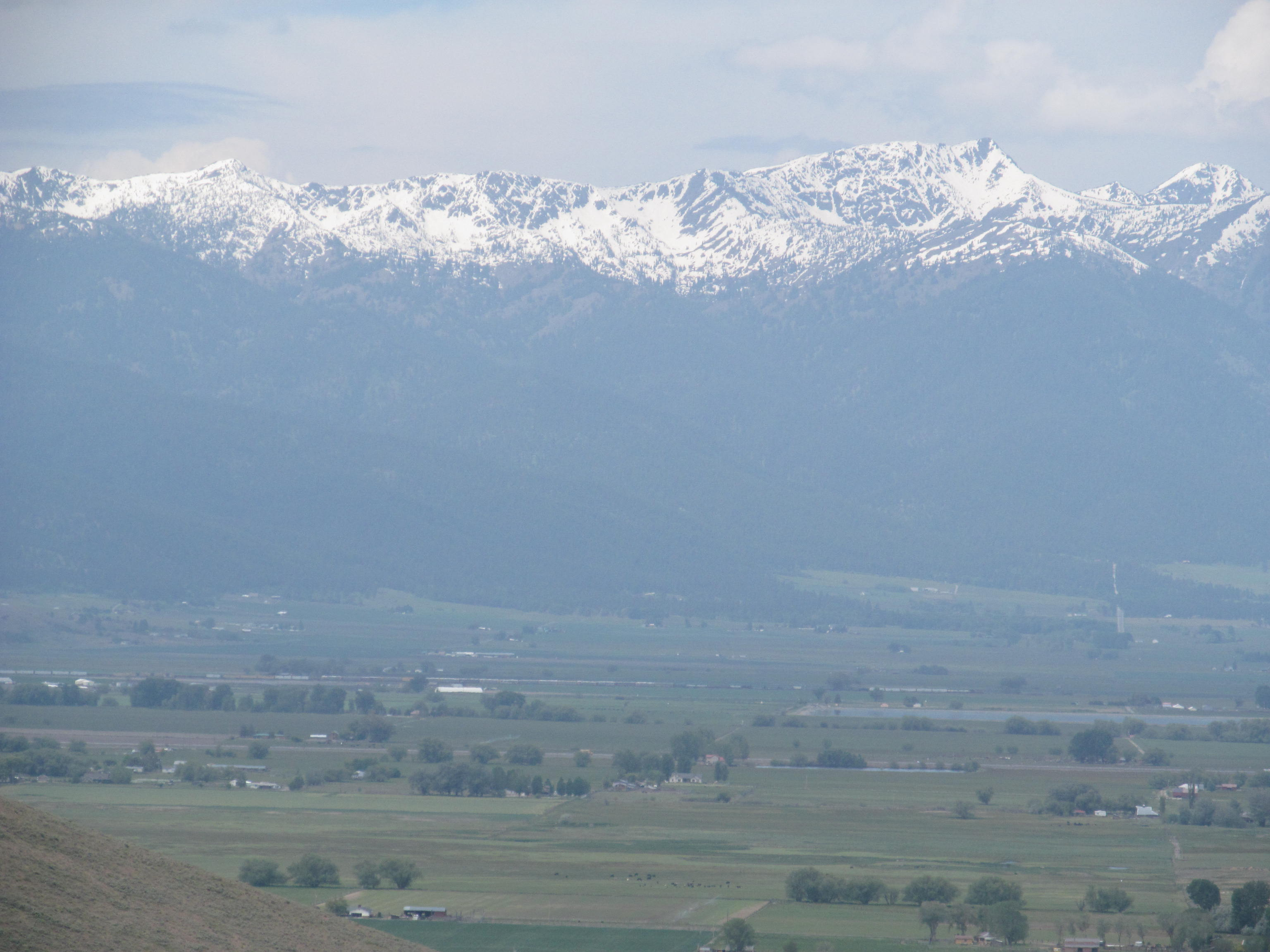
- Baker City, Oregon, with the Blue Mountains in the background, seen from the National Historic Oregon Trail Interpretive Center observatory

Highest point
- Peak: Rock Creek Butte
- Elevation: 9,106 ft (2,776 m)
- Coordinates: 44°49′00″N 118°06′13″W

Dimensions
- Area: 15,000 mi^{2} (39,000 km^{2})

Geography
- Country: United States
- States: Oregon, Washington

The Blue Mountains are a mountain range in the northwestern United States, located largely in northeastern Oregon and stretching into extreme southeastern Washington. The range has an area of about 15,000 square miles (39,000 km^{2}), stretching east and southeast of Pendleton, Oregon, to the Snake River along the Oregon–Idaho border.

The Blue Mountains cover ten counties across two states; they are Union, Umatilla, Grant, Baker, Wallowa and Harney counties in Oregon, and Walla Walla, Columbia, Garfield and Asotin counties in Washington. The Blue Mountains were named after the color of the mountains when seen from a distance and the blue hue imparted by the smoke of forest and range fires set by Indigenous people as management tools in the fall.

The Blue Mountains are unique as the home of the world's largest living organism, a subterranean colonial mycelial mat of the fungus Armillaria ostoyae.

== Geography ==
The Blue Mountains include several mountain ranges, from the Ochoco Mountains and Maury Mountains in the west near Prineville, Oregon, through the Greenhorn Mountains, the Aldrich Mountains, and the Strawberry Range, to the Elkhorn Mountains. The tallest peaks are Rock Creek Butte at 9,106 feet (2,776 m) in the Elkhorn Mountains, and Strawberry Mountain at 9,042 feet (2,756 m) in the Strawberry Range.

Much of the range is included in the Malheur National Forest, Umatilla National Forest, and Wallowa–Whitman National Forest. Several wilderness areas encompass remote parts of the range, including the North Fork Umatilla Wilderness, the North Fork John Day Wilderness, the Strawberry Mountain Wilderness, and the Monument Rock Wilderness, all of which are in Oregon. The Wenaha–Tucannon Wilderness sits astride the Oregon–Washington border. The lands in the Blue Mountains are managed not only by the United States Forest Service and the Bureau of Land Management public agencies, but also by private land owners and the Confederated Tribes of the Umatilla Indian Reservation.

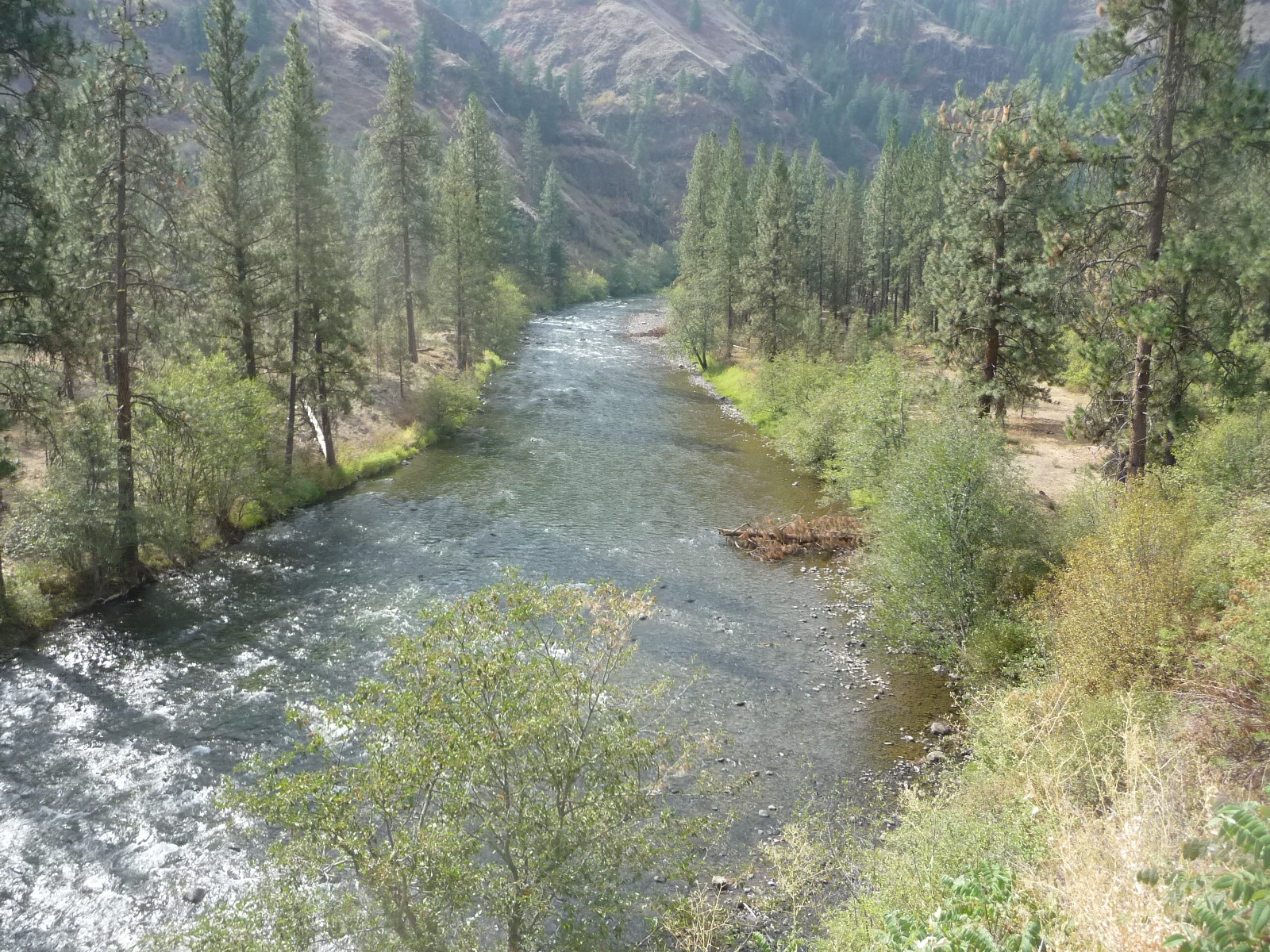
Wenaha River, tributary of the Grande Ronde

The range is drained by several rivers, including the Grande Ronde and Tucannon, tributaries of the Snake, as well as the forks of the John Day, Umatilla and Walla Walla rivers, tributaries of the Columbia. The southernmost portion of the Blue Mountains is drained by the Silvies River, in the endorheic Harney Basin.

== Geology ==
The Blues are uplift mountains and contain some of the oldest rocks in Oregon. Rocks as old as 400 million years protrude through surrounding Columbia River Basalt flows and related volcanics of 16.7 million to about 6 million years ago. Geologically, the oldest rocks of the Blue Mountains (400+ to about 150 million years in age) were created as island arcs in the Pacific Ocean and accreted onto the North American plate. Today, this suture zone runs through Western Idaho (Riggins and McCall). Within these terranes are igneous intrusions, some of which have intruded after accretion.

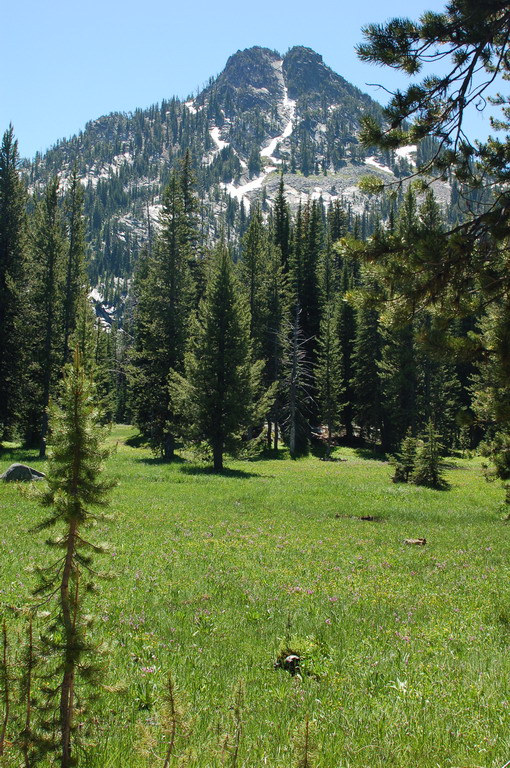
Meadow in the Elkhorn Mountains

The ranges of the Blue Mountains were uplifted by folding upward into the "Blue Mountain Anticline" by tectonic rotation that began about 14 million years ago. More limited faulting and extension in places that include Baker valley and the Grande Ronde valley also contributed to today's topography. The Wallowa Mountains are considered to be part of the Blues by many geologists because their geology includes the same accreted terranes as the Elkhorns, Greenhorns, and Strawberries, although their mechanism of uplift differs somewhat. Similarly, the geology of Hells Canyon and the Seven Devils Mountains is also composed of accreted terranes of a similar nature.

== History ==
=== Habitation by Native Americans ===
The river valleys and lower levels of the range were occupied by indigenous peoples for thousands of years. Historic tribes of the region included the Walla Walla, Cayuse people and Umatilla, now acting together as the Confederated Tribes of the Umatilla Indian Reservation, located mostly in Umatilla County, Oregon. The southern portion of the Blue Mountains were inhabited by several different bands of the Northern Paiute, a Great Basin culture. Native American tribes originally migrated to the Blue Mountains for hunting and salmon runs. The Natives used to purposefully burn small parts of the forest in order to create pastures to attract game for hunting.

=== During westward expansion of the United States ===
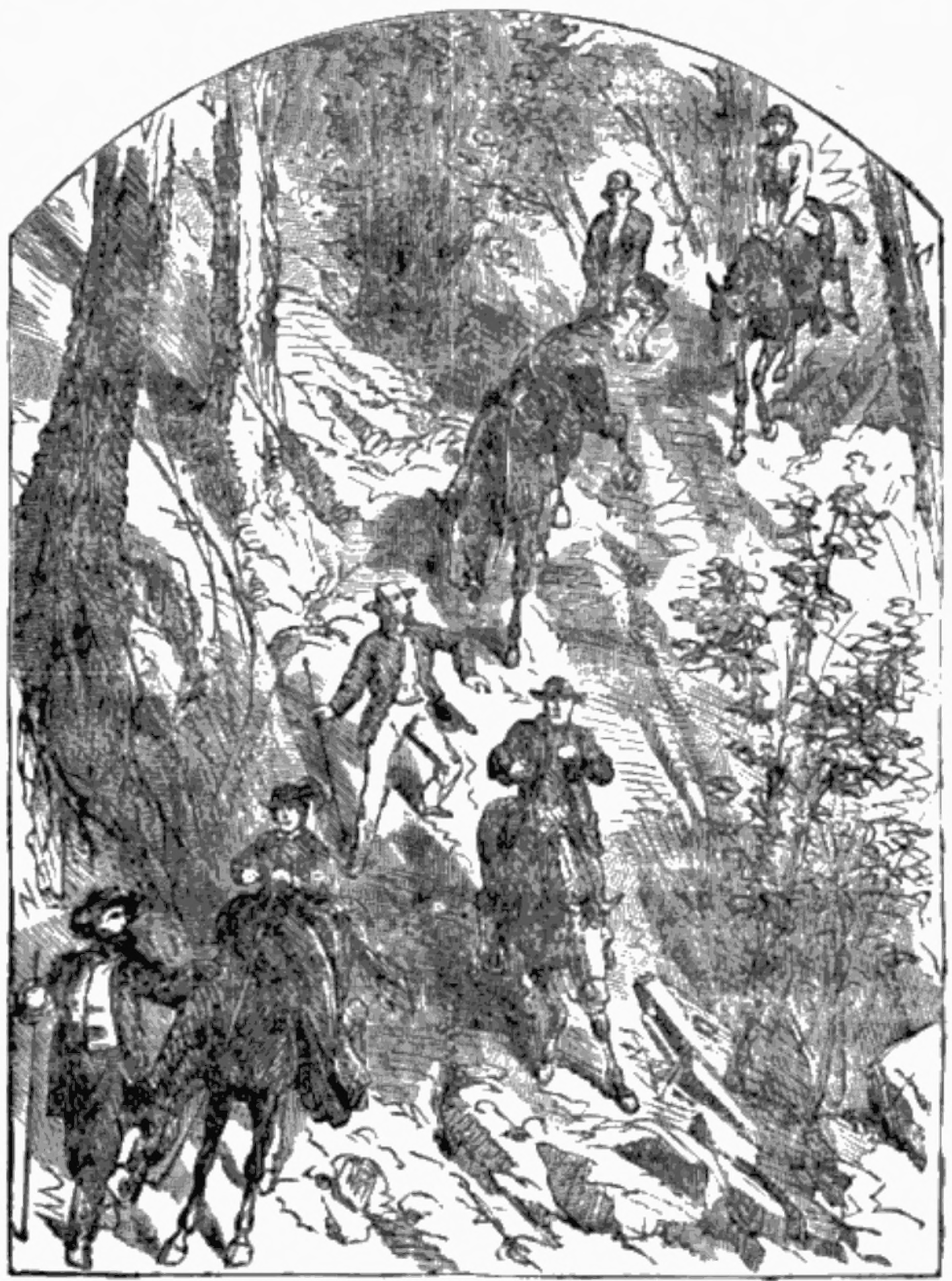
A party descending the Blue Mountains in their journey along the Oregon Trail. Drawing from Eleven years in the Rocky Mountains and a life on the frontier by Frances Fuller Victor (1877).

In the mid-1800s, the Blue Mountains were a formidable obstacle to settlers traveling on the Oregon Trail and were often the last mountain range American pioneers had to cross before either reaching southeast Washington near Walla Walla or passing down the Columbia River Gorge to the end of the Oregon Trail in the Willamette Valley near Oregon City.

=== Modern travel ===
The range is currently traversed by Interstate 84, which crosses the crest of the range at a 4,193-foot (1,278 m) summit, from south-southeast to north-northwest between La Grande and Pendleton. The community of Baker City is located along the south-eastern flank of the range. U.S. Route 26 crosses the southern portion of the range, traversing the Blue Mountain Summit and reaching an elevation of 5,098 feet (1,554 m).

It is also crossed by the Union Pacific Railroad's mainline between Portland, Oregon, and Pocatello, Idaho, which crests the summit at Kamela, Oregon. The summit lies on Union Pacific's La Grande Subdivision, which runs between La Grande and Hinkle, the latter of which is the site of a major UP yard.

== Wildlife ==
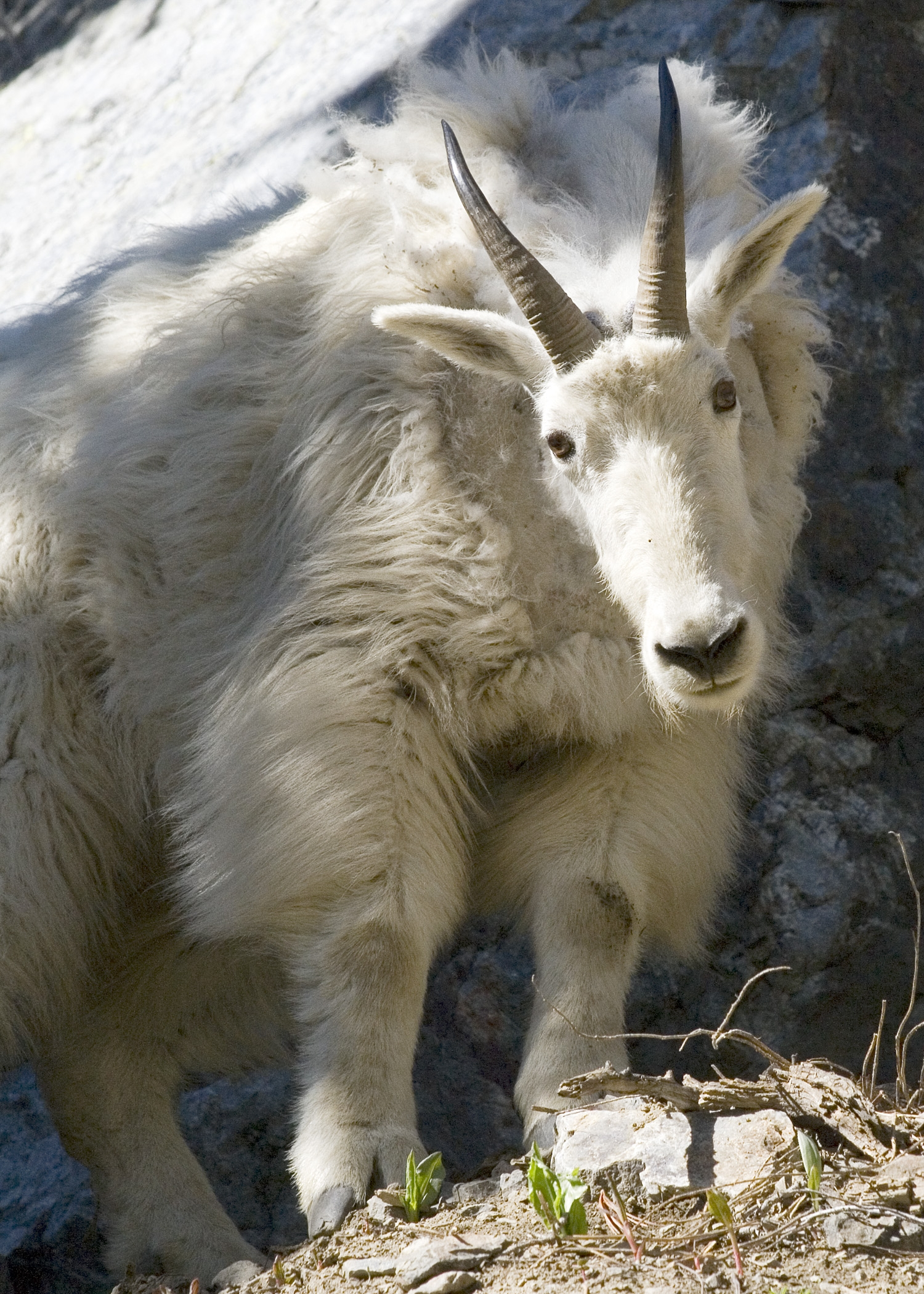
Mountain goat in the Elkhorn Mountains

Birds of the area include bald eagle, Lewis's woodpecker, Williamson's sapsucker, red-breasted nuthatch, golden-crowned kinglet and many migratory species, with the riverbanks important habitat for this birdlife. Mammals that move through the mountain grasslands include Rocky Mountain elk, Bighorn sheep and Mule deer. Native fish include Chinook Salmon, Steelhead, Redband Trout, Bull Trout, and Pacific Lamprey.

The Blue Mountains in Washington are home to one of 10 identified elk herds in the state, with a population of approximately 4,500 Rocky Mountain elk as of 2018 across the region. In 1989, in response to a decline in the elk population and a heavy female-biased population, the Washington Fish & Wildlife Department regulated elk hunting in the Washington Blue Mountains with a "spike-only" general hunting season, permitting hunting of only male elk with at least one visible non-branched antler. By the mid 1990s the area then became known for its mature males and trophy hunting. In 2018, Washington State proposed an updated elk management plan intended to improve the health of elk populations and habitats, reduce human conflict and agricultural damage, and managing elk populations for recreational, educational, scientific, and ceremonial purposes.

== See also ==
- List of mountain ranges of Oregon
