= John Day River (northwestern Oregon) =

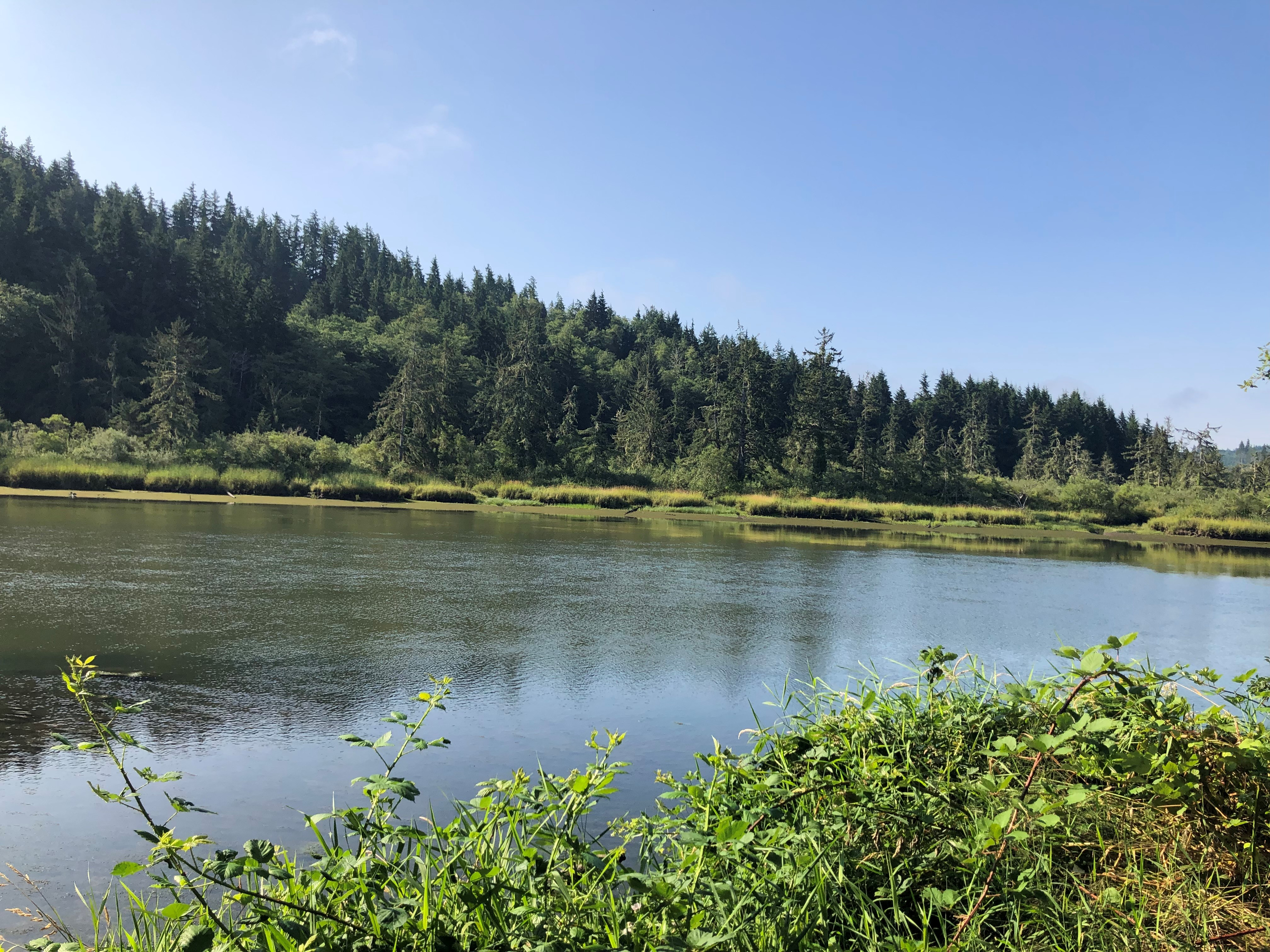
- John Day River (northwestern Oregon)

- Location of the mouth of the John Day River in Oregon
- Etymology: John Day of the Astor–Hunt party of 1811–12

Location
- Country: United States
- State: Oregon
- County: Clatsop

Physical characteristics
- Source: Northern Oregon Coast Range
  - location: Clatsop State Forest
  - coordinates: 46°08′20″N 123°42′17″W
  - elevation: 467 ft (142 m)
- Mouth: Columbia River
  - location: Cathlamet Bay
  - coordinates: 46°10′53″N 123°44′26″W
  - elevation: 3 ft (0.91 m)

The John Day River is a tributary of the Columbia River, approximately 6 miles (10 km) long, in northwestern Oregon in the United States. The river rises in the Northern Oregon Coast Range in Clatsop County at 46.138889°N 123.704722°W.

Flowing generally north, the river enters the Columbia at John Day Point, east of Tongue Point and about 4 miles (7 km) east of Astoria. It passes under U.S. Route 30 near the unincorporated community of John Day (not to be confused with the city of the same name in Grant County). The mouth of the river is about 15 miles (24 km) upstream from the mouth of the Columbia on the Pacific. The John Day River has only one named tributary, Jack Creek, which enters from the left.

The river is named for John Day, a hunter and fur trapper who took part in William Price Hunt's overland expedition for John Jacob Astor in 1811–12. There's a John Day River in eastern Oregon, a John Day Dam, a city John Day, and John Day Fossil Beds National Monument, which were all named after John Day. John Day Point, a cape located at the mouth of the river and protruding into Cathlamet Bay, takes its name from the river, as did a former railway station in the vicinity. Lewis and Clark, who camped near here in 1805, referred to the river as Kekemarke, their version of a Native American name. Lewis and Clark write about the river in their journals. The river was known as Swan Creek by Charles Wilkes, of the U.S. Exploring Expedition and was documented as such on his illustrated map.

There's a railroad swing bridge crossing the mouth of the river. The tracks were used by the Lewis and Clark Explorer train which is no longer operating. The railroad bridge has a clearance of 8 feet.

Tidal currents control the river throughout most of its length. Moored houseboats cover some of the shorelines on both sides of the river.

== Recreational activities ==
The John Day River is open to boats, kayaks, and fishing. John Day County Park is 54 acres and the only public park along the John Day River. The boat launch is accessed off Oregon Highway 30. The boat launch puts users into the John Day River just before it enters the Columbia River, giving users access to both. The river can be accessed for about 3.5 miles upstream once you leave the boat ramp.

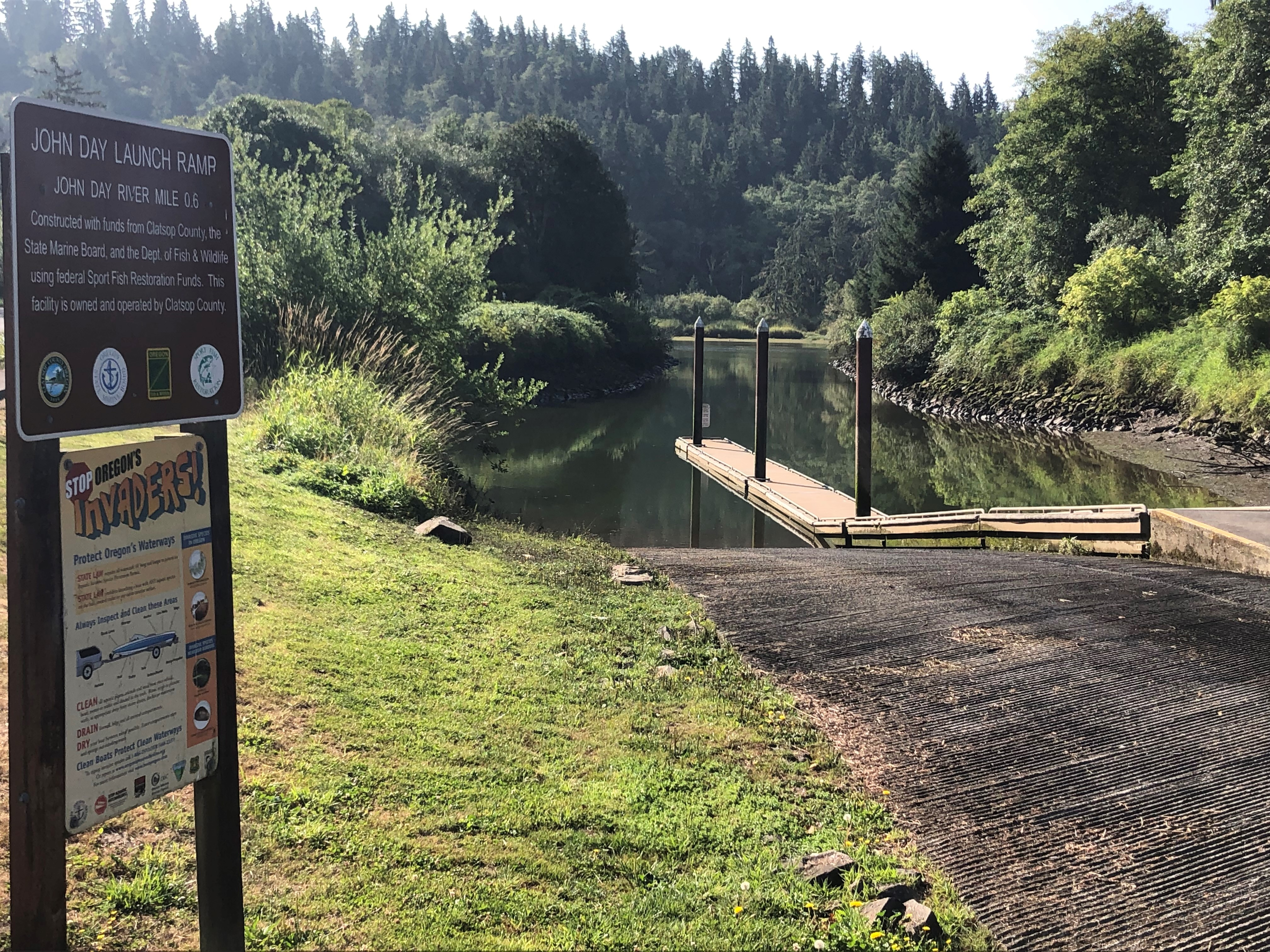
John Day County Park Boat Launch

== Marsh ==
An uncommon tidal marsh exists along the John Day River. The Marsh is a little over 24 acres owned by North Coast Land Conservancy. The John Day River Marsh is part of the Columbia Quiet Waters initiative which covers the lower Columbia River swamp. The initiative includes a conservation plan to protect the Sitka spruce wetlands that are regarded as rare worldwide.

== See also ==
- Clatsop County, Oregon
- Lists of rivers
- List of rivers of Oregon
- List of tributaries of the Columbia River
- River
- Riverboat

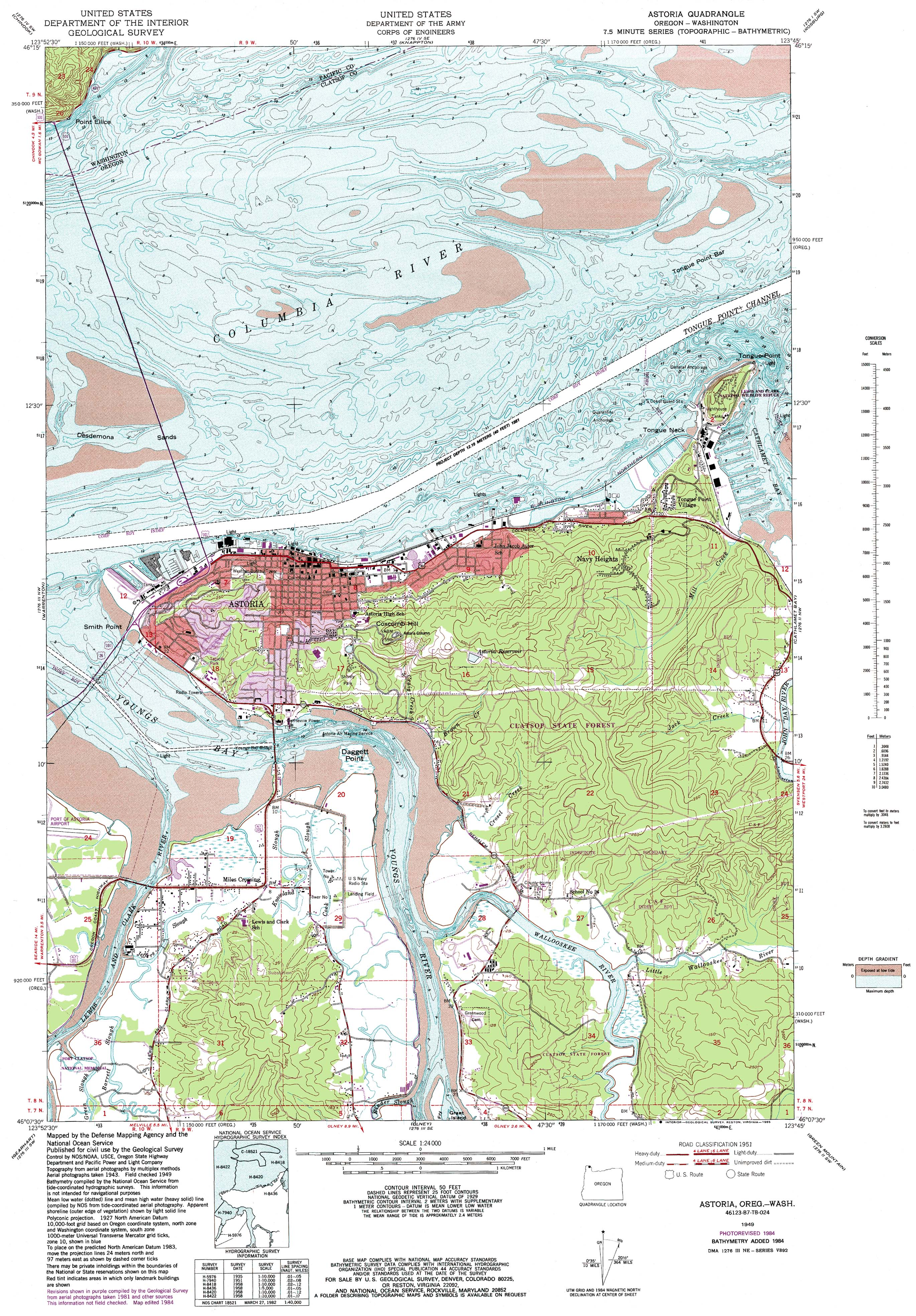
John Day River topographic map Astoria.
