= Ritter, Oregon =

Unincorporated community in the state of Oregon, United States

Coordinates: 44°53′33″N 119°08′37″W

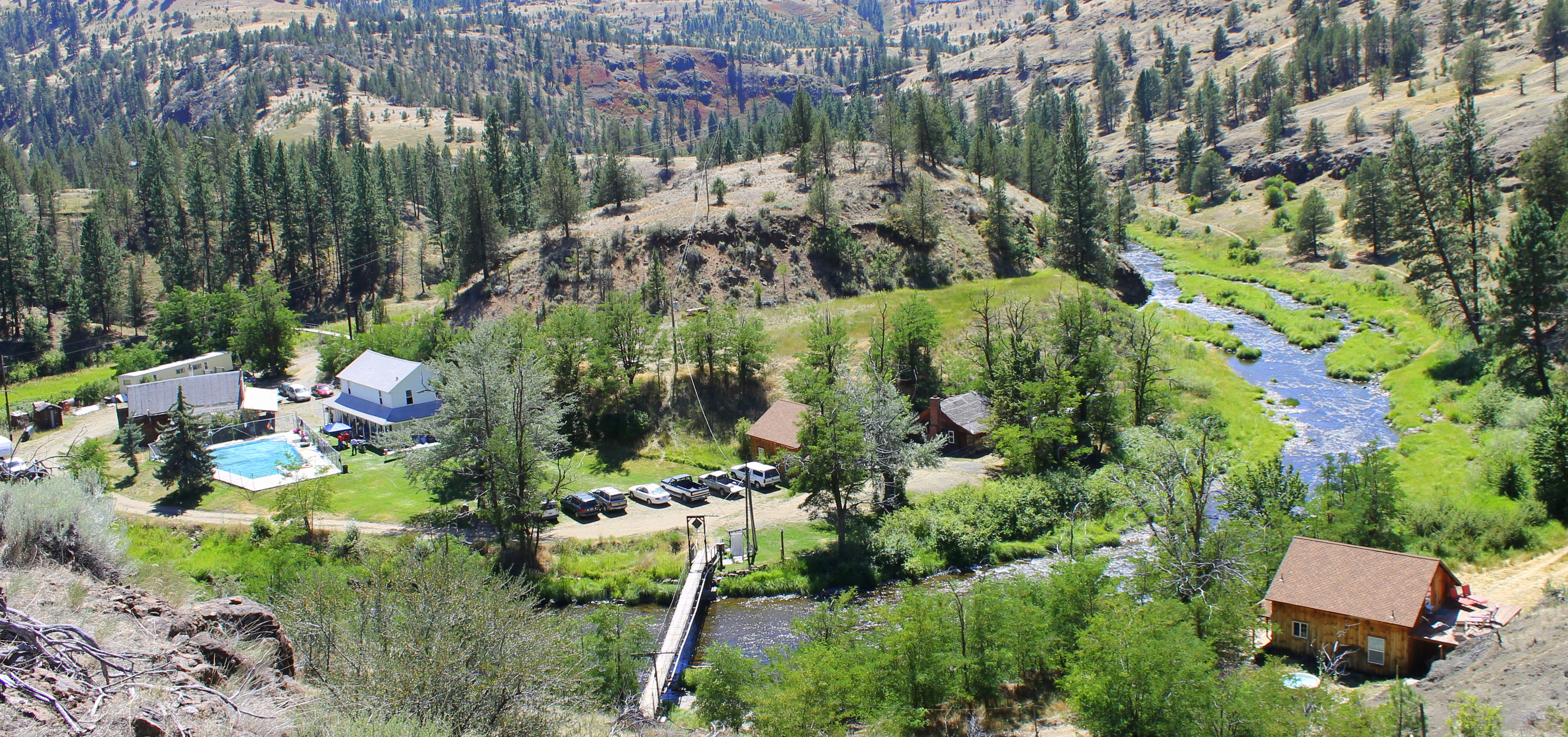
Ritter Hot Springs and the Middle Fork John Day River

Ritter is an unincorporated community in Grant County, Oregon, United States. It is located ten miles down the Middle Fork John Day River from U.S. Route 395, between Dale and Long Creek. At one time the locale was also known as Ritter Hot Springs.

When a post office was established in this locale, it was named for the Rev. Joseph Ritter, a pioneer Baptist minister of the John Day Valley, on whose ranch it was situated. The post office was originally near the mineral hot springs there, formerly known as McDuffee Hot Springs but now known as Ritter Hot Springs. The springs were discovered by William Neal McDuffee, an early-day packer who traveled between Umatilla and the John Day Valley mines.

In 1988, the post office had moved to the old schoolhouse across the river. As of 2009, Ritter no longer has its own post office; Ritter's mail is addressed to Long Creek.
