= Oregon Route 402 =

State highway in Grant County, Oregon, US

Oregon Route 402
- Route 402 highlighted in red

Route information
- Maintained by ODOT
- Length: 34.88 mi (56.13 km)
- Existed: 2002–present

Major junctions
- West end: OR 19 in Kimberly
- East end: US 395 in Long Creek

Location
- Country: United States
- State: Oregon
- County: Grant

Highway system
- Oregon Highways; Interstate; US; State; Named; Scenic
← US 395	→ I-405

Oregon Route 402 (OR 402) is an Oregon state highway running from Kimberly to Long Creek. OR 402 is known as the Kimberly-Long Creek Highway No. 402 (see Oregon highways and routes). It is 34.88 miles (56.13 km) long and runs east–west, entirely within Grant County.

OR 402 was established in 2002 as part of Oregon's project to assign route numbers to highways that previously were not assigned.

== Route description ==
OR 402 begins at an intersection with OR 19 at Kimberly and heads east through Monument and Hamilton to Long Creek, where it ends at an intersection with US 395.

== History ==
OR 402 was assigned to the Kimberly-Long Creek Highway in 2002.

== Major intersections ==
The entire route is in Grant County.

Location	mi	km	Destinations	Notes
Kimberly	0.00	0.00	OR 19	
Long Creek	34.88	56.13	US 395 – John Day, Pendleton	
1.000 mi = 1.609 km; 1.000 km = 0.621 mi
