= Hamilton, Oregon =

Unincorporated community in the state of Oregon, United States

Coordinates: 44°44′26″N 119°18′33″W

Hamilton is an unincorporated community in Grant County, Oregon, United States. It is located on Oregon Route 402 east of Monument and west of Long Creek. As of 1993, the community had no businesses and only three houses.

The community and nearby Hamilton Mountain were named for John Henry Hamilton, the first settler in the area. Hamilton, a cattle rancher, arrived in Grant County sometime in 1874 and lived there until his death in 1909. Local settlers met at Hamilton's ranch to race horses. Hamilton post office was established in 1884 and closed in 1959. Anson C. Frink built the first store and served as the first postmaster.
