= Aldrich Mountains =

Mountain range in Grant County, Oregon, USA

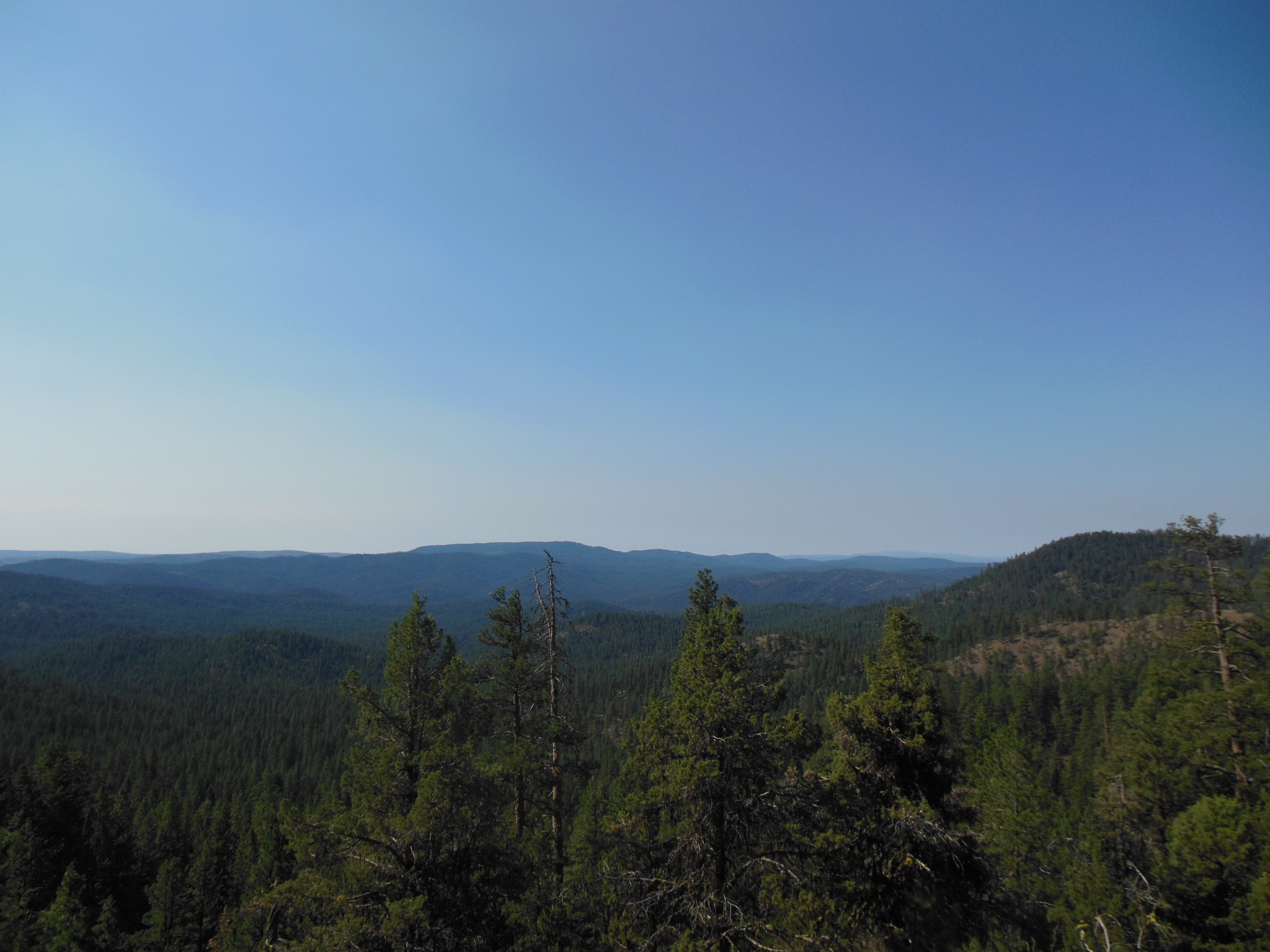
- The Aldrich Mountains just south of Fields Peak

Highest point
- Peak: Fields Peak
- Elevation: 7,366 ft (2,245 m)
- Coordinates: 44°20′19″N 119°15′30″W

Geography
- Location within Oregon
- Country: United States
- State: Oregon
- County: Grant
- Range coordinates: 44°18′55″N 119°18′29″W
- Topo map: USGS Big Weasel Springs

The Aldrich Mountains are a mountain range in Grant County, Oregon, United States. An east–west range rising south of the John Day River valley, the mountains are bounded on the west by the South Fork John Day River, on the south by Murderers Creek and the Bear Valley, and the east by Canyon Creek. Most of the Aldrich Mountains and the mountainous terrain south of them are contained within the Malheur National Forest. The highest point in the range is Fields Peak at 7,366 feet (2,245 m) The nearest human settlement is Mount Vernon, located in the John Day River valley. Across the South Fork John Day River to the west are the Ochoco Mountains, while across Canyon Creek to the east is the Strawberry Range.
