= John Day (trapper) =

American hunter and fur trapper

John Day (ca. 1770 – February 16, 1820) was an American hunter and fur trapper in the Pacific Northwest, including present-day Oregon, Washington, Idaho, Western Montana and Southern British Columbia.

== Biography ==
John Day was born around 1770 in Culpeper County, Virginia and came west through Kentucky to Spanish Upper Louisiana (now Missouri) by 1797. After a few years trading up the Missouri River, in late 1810 he was engaged as a hunter for the Pacific Fur Company and joined an overland expedition led by Wilson Price Hunt. The party trekked west from Missouri to Fort Astoria at the mouth of the Columbia River in 1811–12. Day is best known, along with Ramsay Crooks, for being robbed and stripped naked by Native Americans on the Columbia River near the mouth of the river that now bears his name in Eastern Oregon, and forced to walk about seventy miles back up the Columbia River to friendly Walla Walla Indians, through harsh conditions without clothing or tools of any kind. After finally making their way to Fort Astoria in April 1812, Day was assigned to accompany Robert Stuart back east to St. Louis in June 1812, but was left on the Lower Columbia River where he is said to have gone mad. He returned to Fort Astoria and spent the next eight years hunting and trapping mainly in the Willamette Valley and the inland northwest. John Day died February 16, 1820, at the winter camp of Donald MacKenzie's Snake Country Expedition in what is now the Little Lost River valley in Butte County, Idaho.

His name is well-remembered, being attached to the John Day River and its four branches in eastern Oregon, as well as the cities of John Day and Dayville in Grant County, Oregon, and a smaller John Day River and unincorporated community in Clatsop County, Oregon, the John Day Dam on the Columbia River, and the John Day Fossil Beds National Monument. The Little Lost River, Idaho, was previously known as "Day's River" and the valley was called "Day's Defile" during the fur trade era.
