= Robinsonville =

Robinsonville may refer to:

- Robinsonville, New Brunswick, Canada
- Robinsonville, Mississippi, United States
- Robinsonville, Oregon, United States
- Robinsonville, Wisconsin, United States
