= Monument Municipal Airport =

- IATA: none; ICAO: none; FAA LID: 12S

Summary
- Airport type: Public
- Operator: City of Monument
- Location: Monument, Oregon
- Elevation AMSL: 2,323 ft / 708.1 m
- Coordinates: 44°49′54.5290″N 119°25′48.97″W
- Interactive map of Monument Municipal Airport

Runways
Direction	Length		Surface
Direction	ft	m	Surface
14/32	2,104	641	Gravel

Monument Municipal Airport (FAA LID: 12S) is a public airport located 1 mile (1.6 km) northwest of Monument, in Grant County, Oregon, United States.
