= Dayville, Oregon =

- City
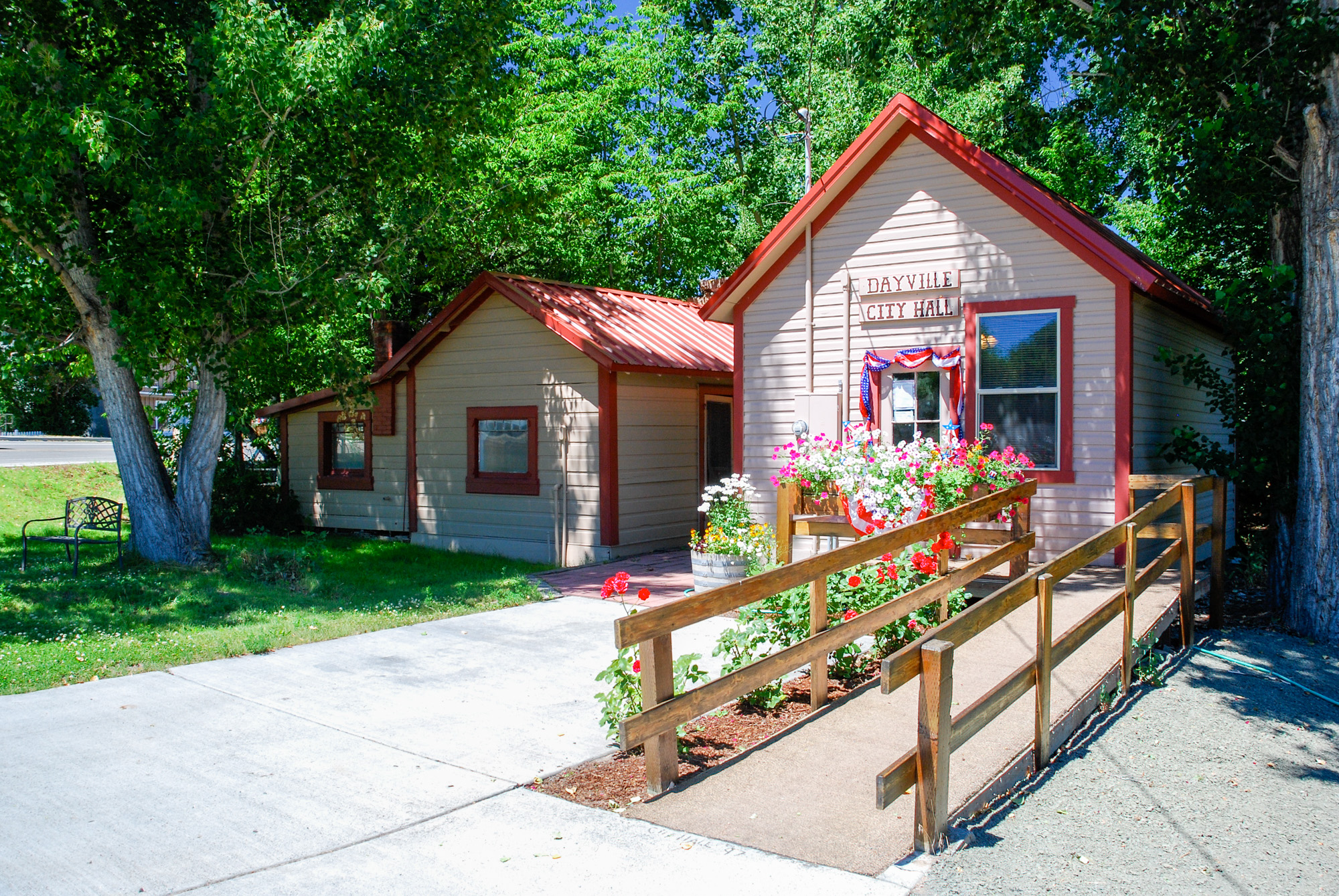
- City Hall

- Location in Oregon
- Coordinates: 44°28′00″N 119°31′56″W
- Country: United States
- State: Oregon
- County: Grant
- Incorporated: 1913

Government
  - Mayor: Valli Hettinga

Area
  - Total: 0.53 sq mi (1.36 km^{2})
  - Land: 0.53 sq mi (1.36 km^{2})
  - Water: 0 sq mi (0.00 km^{2})
- Elevation: 2,346 ft (715 m)

Population (2020)
  - Total: 132
  - Density: 251.1/sq mi (96.96/km^{2})
- Time zone: UTC-8 (Pacific)
  - Summer (DST): UTC-7 (Pacific)
- ZIP Code: 97825
- Area code: 541
- FIPS code: 41-18300
- GNIS feature ID: 2412411

Dayville is a city along U.S. Route 26 in Grant County, in the U.S. state of Oregon. It was incorporated in 1913. The population was 149 at the 2010 census.

== History ==
Dayville was named for the John Day River. The original site of the Dayville post office was 3 miles (5 km) west of the city's current location. In the mid-19th century, Dayville was along the route of a wagon road, renamed The Dalles Military Road in about 1870, that connected The Dalles on the Columbia River with gold mines near Canyon City. Dayville was incorporated in 1913.

== Geography ==
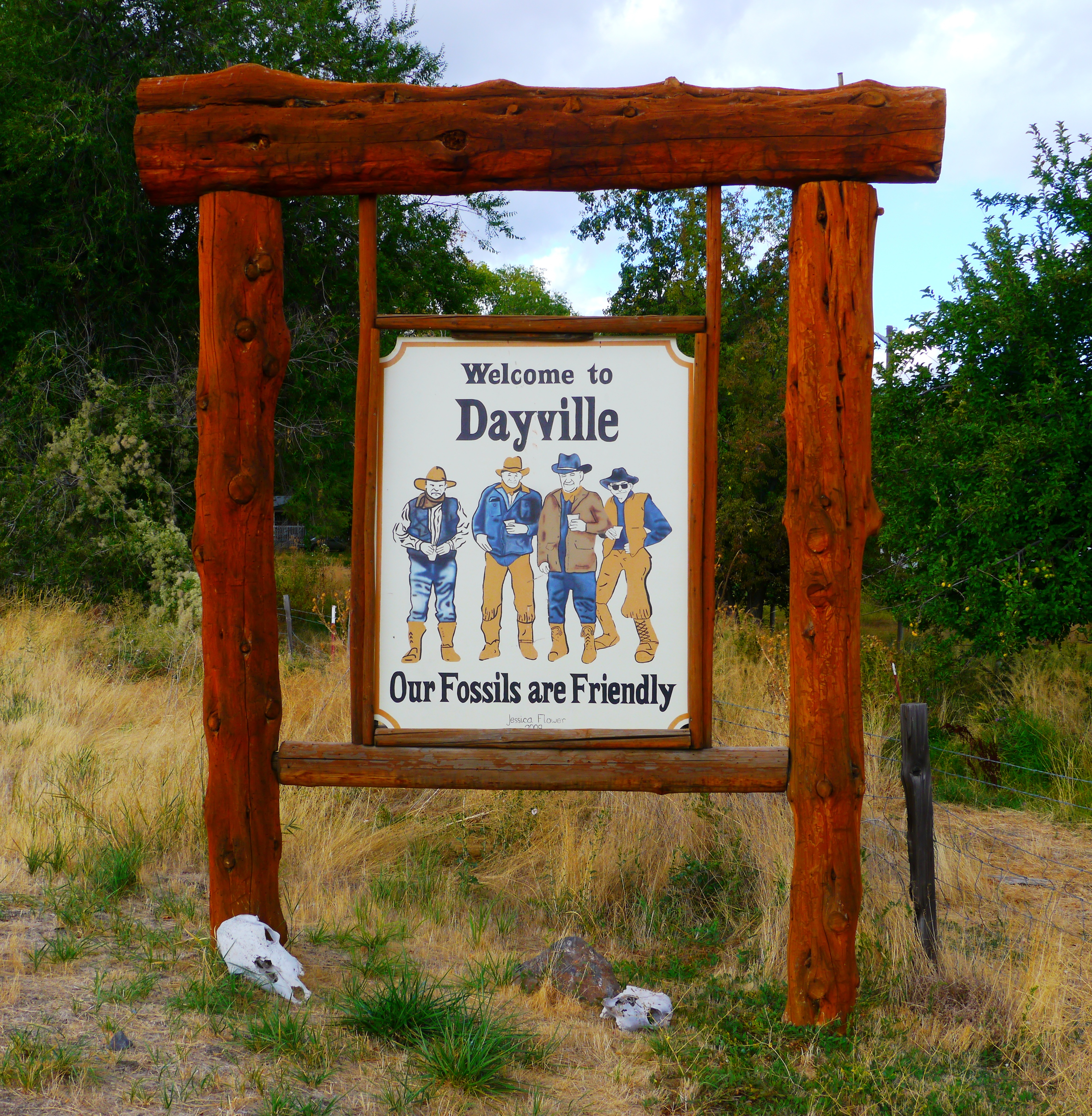
Dayville welcome sign

The city is 125 miles (201 km) east of Bend and 233 miles (375 km) southeast of Portland, at the confluence of the John Day River with the South Fork John Day River. U.S. Route 26 runs east–west through Dayville, and South Fork Road, which runs north–south along the smaller river, meets the larger highway in the city. Murderers Creek State Wildlife Area, the Aldrich Mountains, and parts of the Malheur National Forest are slightly southeast of Dayville. Slightly southwest are the Black Canyon Wilderness, the Ochoco Mountains, and parts of the Ochoco National Forest.

Picture Gorge, named for Native American pictographs painted on the canyon walls, is 6 miles (10 km) northwest of Dayville at the intersection of Route 26 and Oregon Route 19. The Sheep Rock Unit of the John Day Fossil Beds National Monument, including the Thomas Condon Paleontology Center and the James Cant Ranch Historic District and museum, are 2 miles (3 km) north of Picture Gorge along Route 19.

According to the United States Census Bureau, the city has a total area of 0.53 square miles (1.37 km^{2}), all land.

=== Climate ===
Climate data for Dayville, Oregon, 1991–2020 normals, extremes 1978–present
Month	Jan	Feb	Mar	Apr	May	Jun	Jul	Aug	Sep	Oct	Nov	Dec	Year
Record high °F (°C)	67 (19)	76 (24)	83 (28)	95 (35)	102 (39)	114 (46)	114 (46)	112 (44)	111 (44)	96 (36)	86 (30)	67 (19)	114 (46)
Mean maximum °F (°C)	60.5 (15.8)	63.8 (17.7)	73.4 (23.0)	83.0 (28.3)	92.3 (33.5)	99.0 (37.2)	105.9 (41.1)	104.8 (40.4)	99.3 (37.4)	86.7 (30.4)	71.4 (21.9)	59.5 (15.3)	107.0 (41.7)
Mean daily maximum °F (°C)	45.3 (7.4)	50.4 (10.2)	57.5 (14.2)	63.0 (17.2)	72.7 (22.6)	81.0 (27.2)	92.6 (33.7)	91.9 (33.3)	82.4 (28.0)	67.5 (19.7)	53.5 (11.9)	45.5 (7.5)	66.9 (19.4)
Daily mean °F (°C)	37.1 (2.8)	39.7 (4.3)	45.5 (7.5)	50.0 (10.0)	58.1 (14.5)	65.1 (18.4)	73.6 (23.1)	72.6 (22.6)	64.7 (18.2)	53.1 (11.7)	43.0 (6.1)	36.5 (2.5)	53.3 (11.8)
Mean daily minimum °F (°C)	28.8 (−1.8)	29.0 (−1.7)	33.4 (0.8)	37.1 (2.8)	43.6 (6.4)	49.2 (9.6)	54.6 (12.6)	53.3 (11.8)	47.0 (8.3)	38.7 (3.7)	32.5 (0.3)	27.4 (−2.6)	39.6 (4.2)
Mean minimum °F (°C)	9.5 (−12.5)	13.1 (−10.5)	20.4 (−6.4)	24.3 (−4.3)	29.6 (−1.3)	37.3 (2.9)	43.9 (6.6)	41.1 (5.1)	34.3 (1.3)	23.0 (−5.0)	15.6 (−9.1)	10.8 (−11.8)	3.2 (−16.0)
Record low °F (°C)	−12 (−24)	−12 (−24)	12 (−11)	16 (−9)	21 (−6)	28 (−2)	36 (2)	30 (−1)	24 (−4)	2 (−17)	−8 (−22)	−18 (−28)	−18 (−28)
Average precipitation inches (mm)	1.12 (28)	0.85 (22)	1.27 (32)	1.38 (35)	1.95 (50)	1.38 (35)	0.53 (13)	0.54 (14)	0.56 (14)	1.09 (28)	1.32 (34)	1.14 (29)	13.13 (334)
Average snowfall inches (cm)	1.2 (3.0)	0.4 (1.0)	0.3 (0.76)	0.0 (0.0)	0.0 (0.0)	0.0 (0.0)	0.0 (0.0)	0.0 (0.0)	0.0 (0.0)	0.0 (0.0)	0.0 (0.0)	1.1 (2.8)	3.0 (7.6)
Average precipitation days (≥ 0.01 in)	7.5	6.7	10.8	10.1	11.1	7.1	3.4	2.7	3.2	6.3	10.5	6.3	85.7
Average snowy days (≥ 0.1 in)	0.5	0.4	0.3	0.1	0.1	0.0	0.0	0.0	0.0	0.0	0.0	1.1	2.5
Source 1: NOAA
Source 2: National Weather Service

== Demographics ==
Historical population
Census	Pop.	Note	%±
1890	120		—
1900	52		−56.7%
1910	100		92.3%
1920	117		17.0%
1930	106		−9.4%
1940	136		28.3%
1950	286		110.3%
1960	234		−18.2%
1970	197		−15.8%
1980	199		1.0%
1990	144		−27.6%
2000	138		−4.2%
2010	149		8.0%
2020	132		−11.4%

=== 2010 census ===
As of the census of 2010, there were 149 people, 72 households, and 41 families residing in the town. The population density was 281.1 inhabitants per square mile (108.5/km^{2}). There were 93 housing units at an average density of 175.5 per square mile (67.8/km^{2}). The racial makeup of the town was 96.0% White, 3.4% Native American, and 0.7% from two or more races. Hispanic or Latino of any race were 0.7% of the population.

There were 72 households, out of which 19.4% had children under the age of 18 living with them, 47.2% were married couples living together, 9.7% had a female householder with no husband present, and 43.1% were non-families. 38.9% of all households were made up of individuals, and 15.2% had someone living alone who was 65 years of age or older. The average household size was 2.07 and the average family size was 2.68.

The median age in the town was 50.8 years. 14.8% of residents were under the age of 18; 8.1% were between the ages of 18 and 24; 16.1% were from 25 to 44; 38.3% were from 45 to 64; and 22.8% were 65 years of age or older. The gender makeup of the town was 53.7% male and 46.3% female.

=== 2000 census ===
As of the census of 2000, there were 138 people, 59 households, and 36 families residing in the city. The population density was 269.5 inhabitants per square mile (104.1/km^{2}). There were 77 housing units at an average density of 150.4 per square mile (58.1/km^{2}). The racial makeup of the city was 96.38% White, 2.17% Native American, 0.72% Asian, and 0.72% from two or more races.

There were 59 households, out of which 27.1% had children under the age of 18 living with them, 49.2% were married couples living together, 11.9% had a female householder with no husband present, and 37.3% were non-families. 32.2% of all households were made up of individuals, and 10.2% had someone living alone who was 65 years of age or older. The average household size was 2.34 and the average family size was 3.05.

In the city, the population was spread out, with 24.6% under the age of 18, 5.8% from 18 to 24, 24.6% from 25 to 44, 23.9% from 45 to 64, and 21.0% who were 65 years of age or older. The median age was 42 years. For every 100 females, there were 89.0 males. For every 100 females age 18 and over, there were 96.2 males.

The median income for a household in the city was $30,893, and the median income for a family was $33,438. Males had a median income of $27,083 versus $25,417 for females. The per capita income for the city was $18,319. There were 12.2% of families and 16.1% of the population living below the poverty line, including 26.5% of under eighteens and none of those over 64.

== Economy ==
Dayville is home to Dayville School District, a K−12 system with a total of about 50 students in 2007. As of 2002, the five largest employers in Dayville were the school district, the Dayville Merc (groceries), a cafe, a lounge, and a gas station.

The Dayville Presbyterian Church has since the 1970s offered hospitality to bicyclists journeying along the TransAmerica Bicycle Trail.
