= Beech Creek, Oregon =

Unincorporated community in the state of Oregon, United States

Beech Creek
- Unincorporated community
- Location within Oregon
- Coordinates: 44°37′10″N 119°08′56″W
- Country: United States
- State: Oregon
- County: Grant
- Established: 1900
- Elevation: 4,410 ft (1,340 m)
- Time zone: UTC-8 (Pacific (PST))
  - Summer (DST): UTC-7 (PDT)
- ZIP codes: 97856
- GNIS feature ID: 1137877

Beech Creek is an unincorporated community in Grant County, Oregon. It is located at the intersection of U.S. Route 395 and County Road 27.

== History ==
The name of Beech Creek originates from the stream of the same name; itself named for an early settler in the area. According to Oregon Geographic Names, "it seemed appropriate to name it after Beech Creek because it was near the headwaters of that stream." The post office was established on January 26, 1900, and James T. Berry was the first postmaster. The post office closed in 1955.
