= Courtrock, Oregon =

Unincorporated community in the state of Oregon, United States

Courtrock
- Unincorporated community
- Location within Oregon
- Coordinates: 44°38′27″N 119°22′5″W
- Country: United States
- State: Oregon
- County: Grant
- Established: 1926
- Elevation: 3,813 ft (1,162 m)
- Time zone: UTC-8 (Pacific (PST))
  - Summer (DST): UTC-7 (PDT)
- ZIP codes: 97864
- GNIS feature ID: 1159372

Courtrock is an unincorporated community in Grant County, Oregon.

== History ==
The community was named for a nearby formation known as Courthouse Rock. The Courtrock post office was established in April 1926, and closed on May 31, 1953. Viola A. Lauder served as the first postmaster.
