= South Fork John Day River =

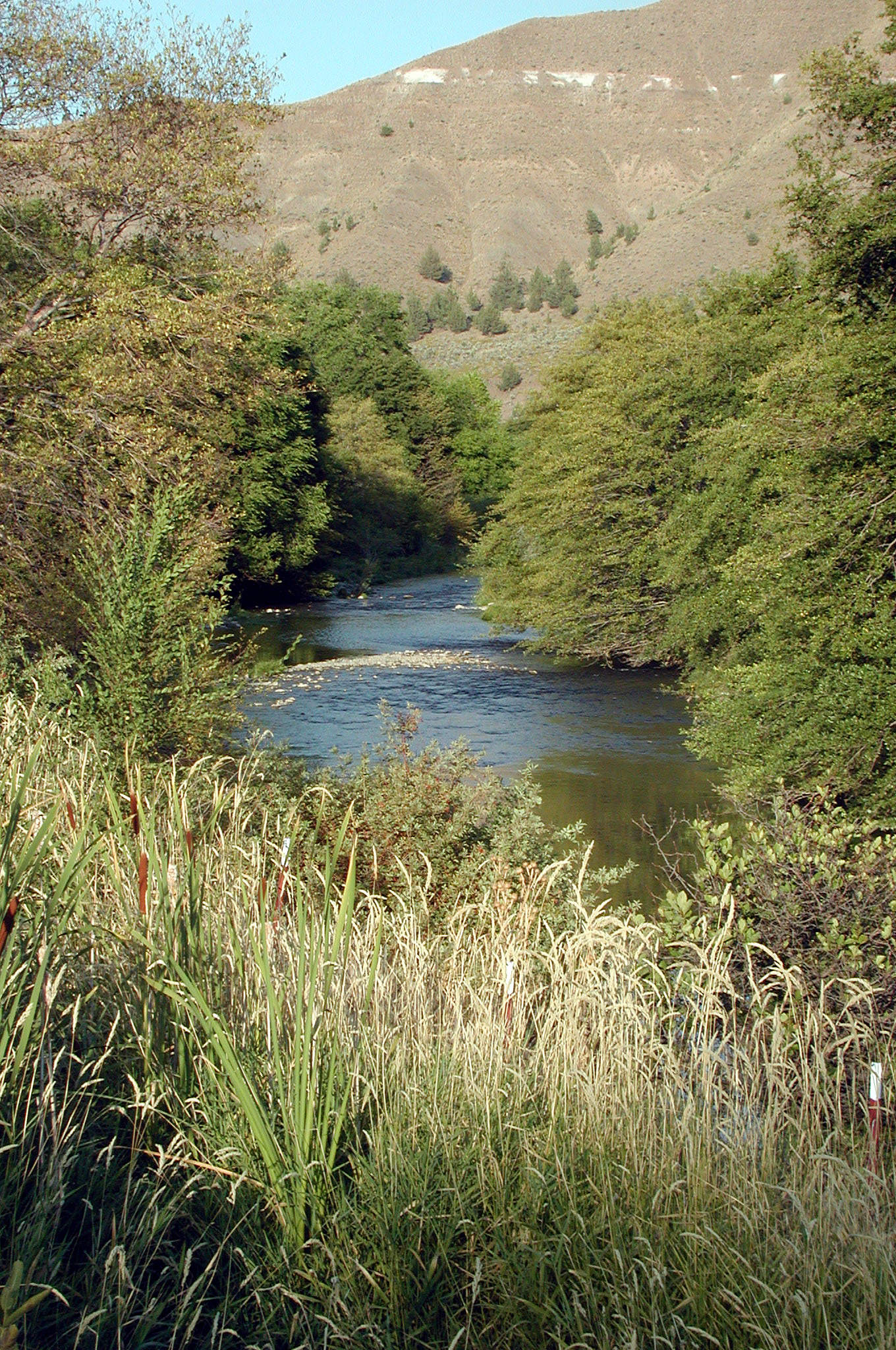
- South Fork John Day River at Dayville

- Location of the mouth of the South Fork John Day River in Oregon
- Etymology: John Day, fur trapper

Location
- Country: United States
- State: Oregon
- Counties: Harney and Grant

Physical characteristics
- Source
  - location: near Alsup Mountain, Malheur National Forest, Harney County, Oregon
  - coordinates: 43°55′09″N 119°19′17″W
  - elevation: 5,396 ft (1,645 m)
- Mouth: John Day River
  - location: Dayville, Grant County, Oregon
  - coordinates: 44°28′26″N 119°32′10″W
  - elevation: 2,326 ft (709 m)
- Length: 60 mi (97 km)
- Basin size: 606 sq mi (1,570 km^{2})
- Discharge
  - location: Dayville, Oregon, near mouth
  - average: 179 cu ft/s (5.1 m^{3}/s)

National Wild and Scenic River
- Type: Recreational
- Designated: October 28, 1988

The South Fork John Day River is a 60-mile (97 km) tributary of the John Day River in the U.S. state of Oregon. It begins in the Malheur National Forest in Harney County about 25 miles (40 km) north-northwest of Burns and flows generally north to Dayville, where it meets the main stem of the John Day River. Along the way, the stream passes through the abandoned town of Izee. The Black Canyon Wilderness in the Ochoco National Forest lies within the river's drainage basin.

A total of 47 miles (76 km) of the river, from the Malheur National Forest boundary to Smoky Creek, are classified "recreational" in the National Wild and Scenic River (NWSR) system, created under the Wild and Scenic Rivers Act of 1968, and offer opportunities for hiking, swimming, camping, hunting, and fishing.

== See also ==
- List of rivers of Oregon
- List of longest streams of Oregon
- List of National Wild and Scenic Rivers
