= Izee, Oregon =

Unincorporated community in the state of Oregon, United States

- Unincorporated community
- Location within Oregon Location within the United States
- Coordinates: 44°04′01″N 119°23′10″W
- Country: United States
- State: Oregon
- County: Grant
- Elevation: 4,101 ft (1,250 m)
- Time zone: UTC-8 (Pacific (PST))
  - Summer (DST): UTC-7 (PDT)
- ZIP code: 97873
- Area codes: 458 and 541
- GNIS feature ID: 1144149

Izee is an unincorporated community in Grant County, Oregon, United States. Its post office operated from November 6, 1889, to July 31, 1954, and the first postmaster was Carlos W. Bonham. Located on the South Fork John Day River, Izee is a ranching community and was so named because a rancher there branded his cattle with the letters I. Z. The schoolhouse and grange building still stand as of 2019.
