= Cabell City, Oregon =

Unincorporated community in the state of Oregon, United States

Cabell City
- Unincorporated community
- Location within Oregon
- Coordinates: 44°53′42.4″N 118°22′5.9″W
- Country: United States
- State: Oregon
- County: Grant
- Elevation: 5,780 ft (1,760 m)
- Time zone: UTC-8 (Pacific (PST))
  - Summer (DST): UTC-7 (PDT)
- ZIP codes: 97877
- GNIS feature ID: 1139098

Cabell City is a ghost town and former mining town in Grant County, Oregon.

== History ==
Cabell City was established in the 1880s by Fred E. and John B. Cabell, who operated the La Bellevue Mine. No post office was established, and Cabell City was never a "city" in any sense of the word. All that remains of the settlement is the cemetery, which houses the graves of Fred and Johanna Cabell and their 8-year-old daughter, as well as a few abandoned buildings and mining equipment.
