= Dale, Oregon =

Unincorporated community in the state of Oregon, United States

Coordinates: 44°59′19″N 118°56′51″W

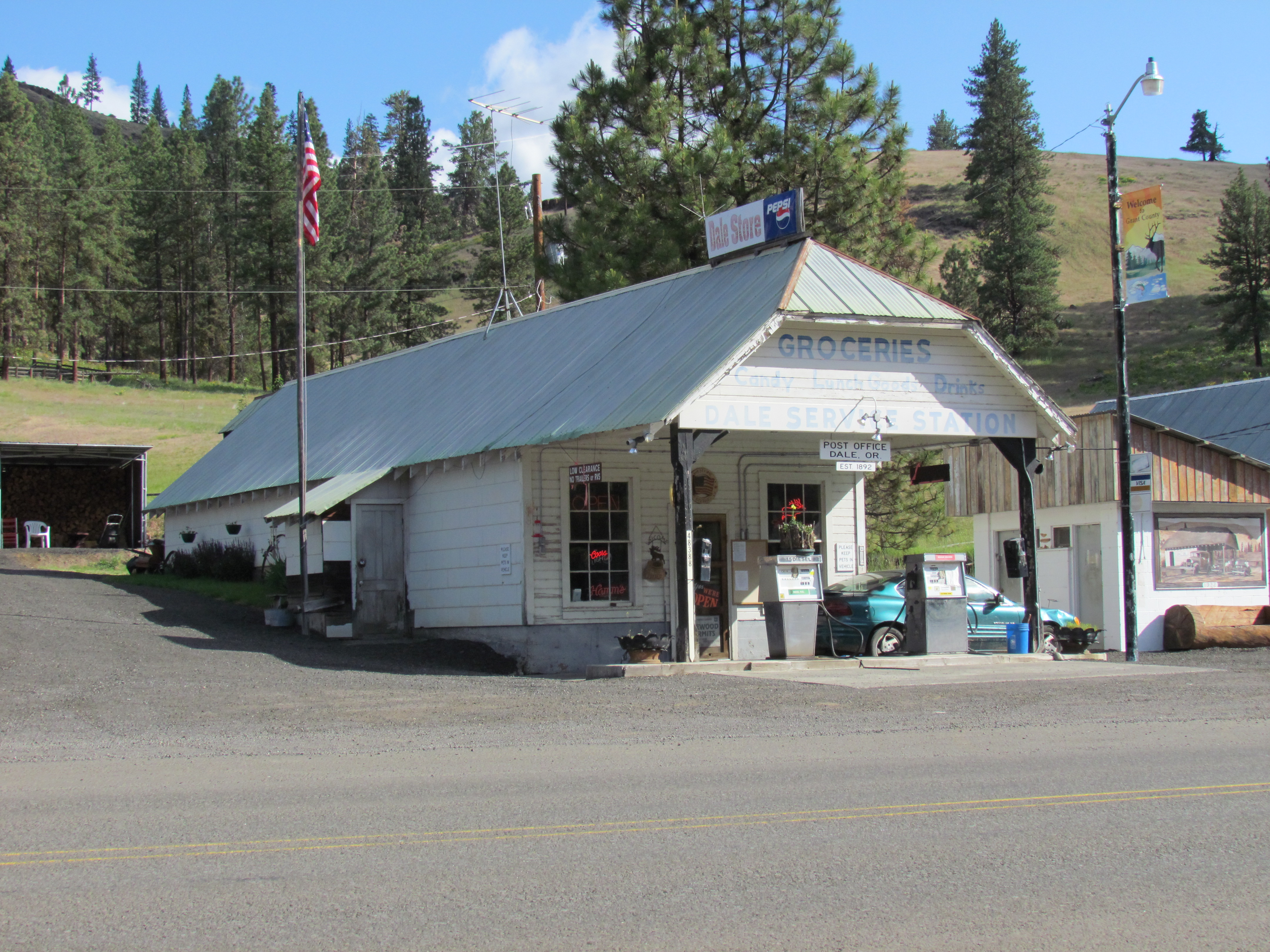
The Dale Service Station

Dale is an unincorporated community in Grant County, Oregon, United States. It is located on U.S. Route 395 within the Umatilla National Forest about 17 miles south of Ukiah. It is near the Umatilla-Grant County border just south of the 45th parallel north.

The first post office at this locale was established in 1887 and named Dorman after James W. Dorman, the first postmaster. The name was changed to Dale in 1891. The office may have been moved south from its original location in Umatilla County and it was shown as being in Grant County by 1903. According to the compiler of Oregon Geographic Names, who did not think that the local terrain resembled a dale, "The name Dale as applied to this locality may have had a significance other than topographic." Mail for Dale is now handled by the Ukiah post office, ZIP code 97880.

In 1940, Dale had a service station and store that still serves the community today. Dale Ranger Station was open by 1911 and closed sometime before 2008.

== See also ==
- Ukiah–Dale Forest State Scenic Corridor
