= Robinsonville, Oregon =

Unincorporated community in the state of Oregon, United States

Robinsonville
- Unincorporated community
- Location within Oregon
- Coordinates: 44°42′49.5″N 118°29′4.8″W
- Country: United States
- State: Oregon
- County: Grant
- Established: 1878
- Elevation: 6,224 ft (1,897 m)
- Time zone: UTC-8 (Pacific (PST))
  - Summer (DST): UTC-7 (PDT)
- ZIP Codes: 97877
- GNIS feature ID: 1148559

Robinsonville, also known as Robisonville, is a ghost town and former mining town in Grant County, Oregon, located near Greenhorn.

== History ==
There is much debate over whether the correct name of the community is "Robinsonville" or "Robisonville"; it was named after William Robinson however post office records use Robisonville, and government records are conflicting. The post office was established on June 27, 1878, and closed on July 23, 1884; Charles W. Daggett served as postmaster.
