= Lewis and Clark Explorer =

Discontinued excursion train between Portland and Astoria

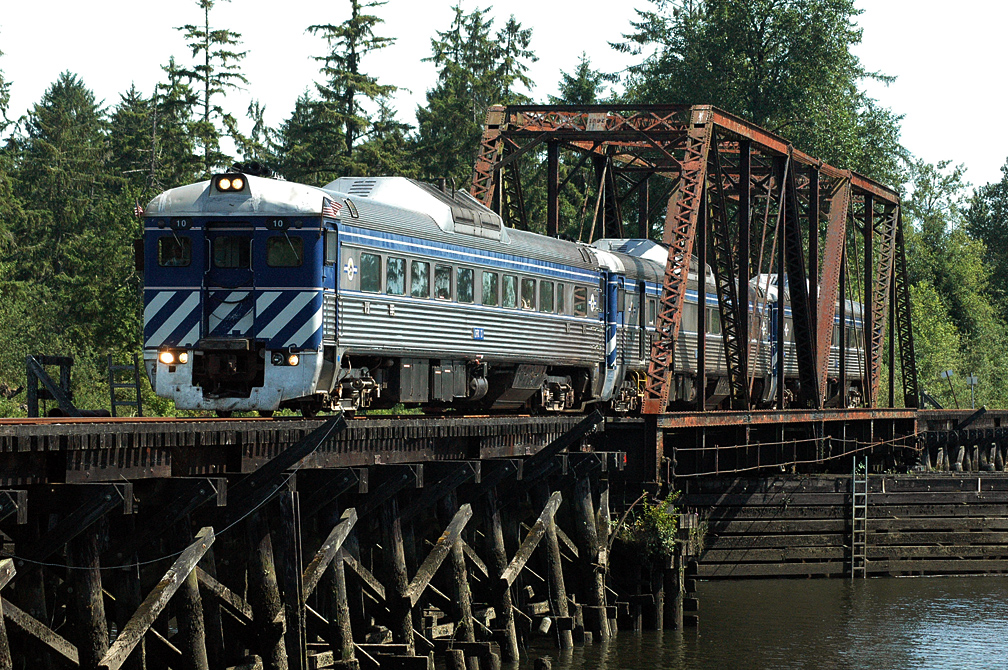
- The Lewis and Clark Explorer crosses a bridge at Blind Slough in July 2005

Overview
- Service type: Seasonal excursion train
- Status: Discontinued
- Former operator: Portland and Western Railroad
- Annual ridership: 17,890 in 2003; 14,030 in 2004 approx. 15,000 in 2005

Route
- Termini: Linnton, Portland, Oregon; Astoria, Oregon
- Stops: 2
- Distance travelled: 97 miles
- Average journey time: approx. 4 hours
- Service frequency: Friday through Monday during summer

Technical
- Rolling stock: Three Budd Rail Diesel Cars
- Operating speed: 25-30 mph

The Lewis and Clark Explorer was an excursion train from Portland, Oregon, to Astoria on the Oregon Coast, which operated from 2003 to 2005. Crews were provided by Portland and Western Railroad, which also owned the tracks, while the cars were owned by the Oregon Department of Transportation (ODOT) and ticketing was handled by Amtrak. The line ran 97 miles along the southern shore of the Columbia, setting out in the morning and returning in the evening Friday through Monday in the summer. The Explorer was part of the bicentennial celebrations of the Lewis and Clark Expedition, and its route included relevant sites and themed decorations.

== Route ==
Bus connections were available from Portland Union Station to the Linnton boarding area "located at 12222 NW Marina Way off St. Helens Road". The Explorer set out from there, passing through industrial Northwest Portland. It then followed U.S. Highway 30 "for most of the first half of the route" through Scappoose and St. Helens. After Rainier it diverged from the highway and followed the shore of the Columbia. Along the route, the train passed over "three small drawbridges" which were hand-cranked by volunteers. Finally, the cars arrived at the historic Astoria Train Depot. The train traveled at 25-30 mph and the trip took about four hours each way. The hours and length of season were chosen so that it would never operate after dark.

== History ==
=== Before opening ===
A passenger rail line between Portland and Astoria existed for "more than half a century before the service was abandoned due to low ridership in 1952." Most freight traffic west of Wauna stopped after the closing of the Astoria Plywood Mill in 1989. During the 1996 Pacific Northwest floods, a landslide at Aldrich Point near Brownsmead "buried about 1,000 feet of tracks, knocking rails clear into the Columbia River and cutting off the last 27 miles of track to Astoria." In 1997, Portland and Western bought the tracks from Burlington Northern. They were cleared in 1999 using $700,000 of federal funds secured by U.S. Rep. Elizabeth Furse, before another slide in the same location hit the tracks in November of that year. In 2002, U.S. Rep. David Wu secured $2 million for repairs on the disused stretch, "which included replacement of 40,000 railroad ties and tons of gravel to ballast the roadbed, in addition to clearing the slide area."

In January 2003, State Rep. Betsy Johnson requested $924,648 of state transportation funds to "create an excursion-style passenger service between Portland and Astoria for the Lewis and Clark Bicentennial celebration." At the time, Johnson was the chairwoman of the Lewis and Clark Bicentennial Oregon committee. The Legislative Fiscal Office recommended that her request be denied. As a last-ditch effort after gathering local support, "[s]he offered to raise $150,000 from the community to purchase one of the rail cars." With this reduction, the proposal passed out of the education subcommittee of the Legislative Emergency Board. To win passage by the full board, Johnson removed the operating subsidy, leaving the request at $442,000. These funds were appropriated to ODOT, which used them to purchase three Budd Rail Diesel Cars from the provincial government of British Columbia.

The Lewis and Clark Explorer's ceremonial first run was scheduled for Saturday, May 17th. While ODOT owned the cars, the state would contract with Amtrak to provide "train crews, daily maintenance, access to Union Station in Portland[,] ticket sales" and insurance (which would have otherwise cost "between $200,000 and $300,000 per year"). On Tuesday, May 13th, news broke that Amtrak, which was struggling financially, would pull out of the agreement due to a Federal Railroad Administration loan requirement that the carrier "not enter into any new services and not incur any additional financial liability". After "Amtrak officials stated they would not allow the service to run after Saturday’s VIP trip" and began refunding passengers' reservations on Wednesday, organizers scrambled to find another partner. On Thursday, state officials announced an agreement with Portland and Western under which the regional operator would handle insurance and service for the line, while Amtrak would "handle ticketing and reservations." After the inaugural trip, the Explorer would depart from "the train station at Linnton north of Portland" (12222 NW Marina Way).

=== After opening ===
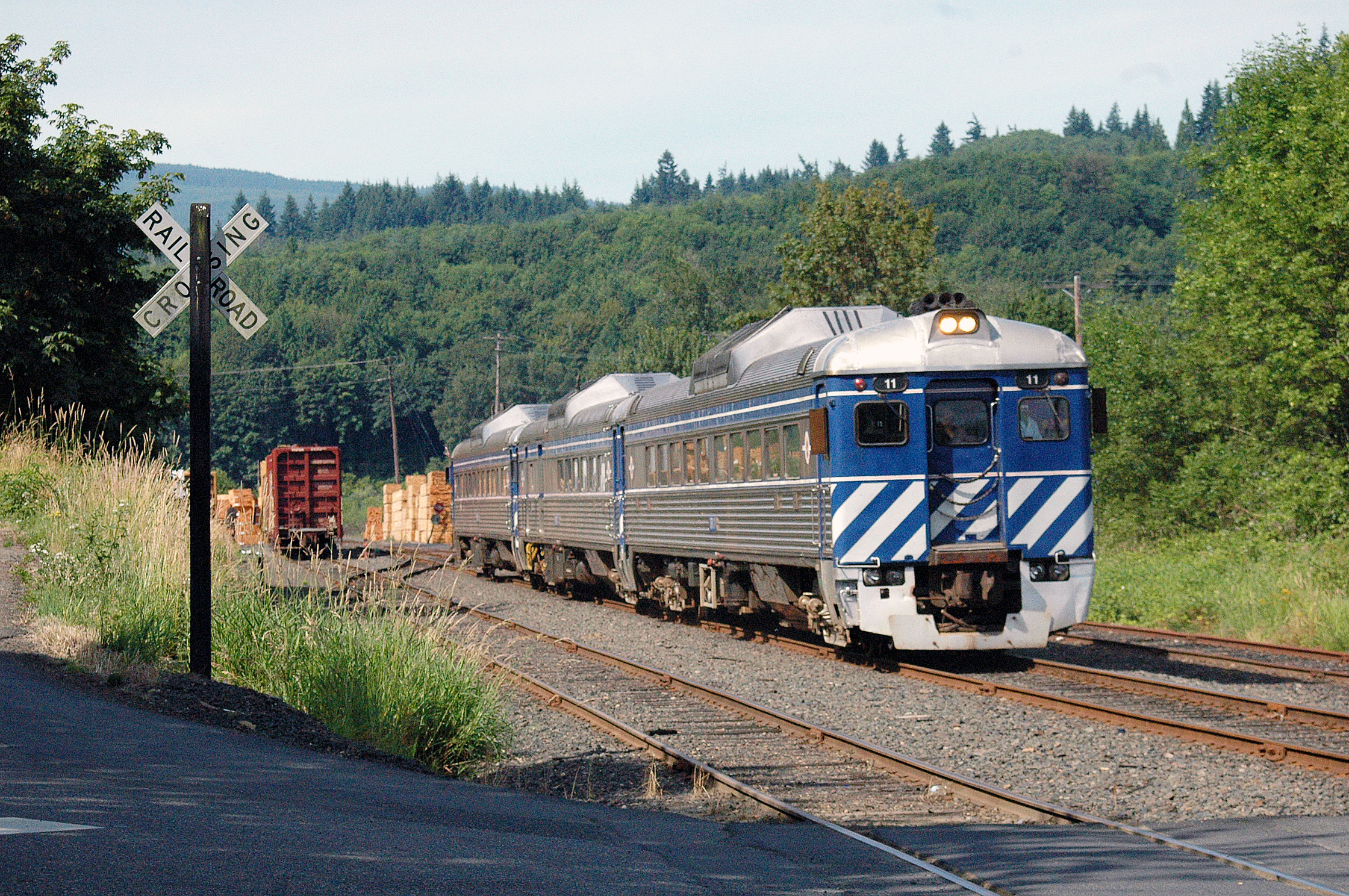
The Lewis and Clark Explorer passes through Clatskanie

At the line's opening ceremony on May 17th, Oregon Secretary of State Bill Bradbury praised "the contortions, sometimes extortions, and arm-twisting Betsy [Johnson] has done behind the scenes to put this train on the tracks[.]" "Bradbury, former U.S. senator Mark Hatfield[,] former Portland mayor Bud Clark[,]" state legislators and county commissioners from Clatsop County, and Astoria city councilors rode on the inaugural run. In Astoria, the train was received by the Astoria High School band.

The last run of the 2003 season was on September 15th. Over the course of the summer the train carried 17,890 passengers. Most passengers returned the same day, but a chunk stayed the night in Astoria and some Astorians used it to travel to Portland. "Ridership averaged 83 percent of capacity over the three-month season, and grew as the season progressed, hitting 90 percent in the last three weeks." Claudia Howells, director of the Oregon Department of Transportation rail division, described this as "extraordinary" under the circumstances. The train ran on time 98% of the time. The Explorer received significant media attention, including an article in the New York Times. "Despite the high ridership, the service fell just short of covering its operational expenses," with officials hoping to fill the shortfall with private donations. There were plans to acquire a fourth car for the 2004 season, which would have helped to break even.

In 2004, the Explorer ran from May 28th to September 20th. Tickets were $29 each way for adults, as opposed to $24 in 2003. The local chamber of commerce and others encouraged visitors to stay overnight in Astoria, working to fill the train in both directions by sending North Coast residents to Portland on the return run. In Astoria, the train connected to "[b]uses from Sunset Empire Transit District and local lodging establishments, as well as the Astoria Trolley". In early September, "a mishap involving a freight train" which led to the closure of a railway bridge in Clatskanie caused the Explorer to be cancelled for a full weekend. Overall, the train carried 14,030 passengers that summer, 21% less than the previous year. Factors such as weaker marketing and less press coverage than year before were mentioned as contributing to this.

In 2005, the Explorer ran from June 3rd to October 3rd. Tickets were $35 each way for adults. Because ODOT had initially only committed to run the line for three years, this was the train's final season. Ridership throughout the season came out to around 15,000 passengers, but thanks to the higher ticket price, this was the only season the Explorer made a profit. Over the three years, the train lost between $100,000 and $150,000. ODOT Rail Planner Bob Melbo explained that because the operating subsidy had not been included in 2003 appropriation, "ODOT was expected to run the service from ticket revenue alone[, which] left few resources for marketing" and "handicapped" the endeavor from the beginning. Portland Western was open to continuing the service and local supporters contacted other excursion train operators in the region about taking over from ODOT. Ultimately no new partner was found, and the three cars were to be sold as a set after the end of the season.
