= Monument, Oregon =

- City
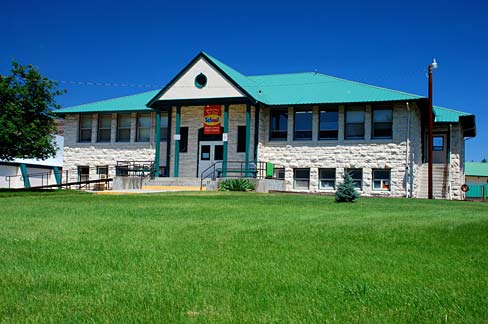
- The Monument School in Monument

- Location in Oregon
- Coordinates: 44°49′15″N 119°25′15″W
- Country: United States
- State: Oregon
- County: Grant
- Incorporated: February 6, 1905

Government
  - Mayor: Sahara Derowitsch

Area
  - Total: 0.51 sq mi (1.32 km^{2})
  - Land: 0.51 sq mi (1.32 km^{2})
  - Water: 0 sq mi (0.00 km^{2})
- Elevation: 2,024 ft (617 m)

Population (2020)
  - Total: 115
  - Density: 226.0/sq mi (87.27/km^{2})
- Time zone: UTC-8 (Pacific)
  - Summer (DST): UTC-7 (Pacific)
- ZIP code: 97864
- Area codes: 458 and 541
- FIPS code: 41-49750
- GNIS feature ID: 2411152
- Website: http://www.cityofmonument.com

Monument is a city in Grant County, Oregon, United States. The population was 115 at the 2020 census. It is located near the confluence of the North and Middle Forks of the John Day River. Its post office was established in 1874 and named for a nearby mountain or rock formation.

As of 2000, the Monument School District, consisting of the Monument School, had a 7,000-square-foot (650 m^{2}) science building for its environmental sciences curriculum, which was paid for by a federal grant of about a $500,000. The program taught students about the ecology of local Ponderosa Pine forest and sagebrush steppe and the water quality and habitat of streams. The school had over 100 students in 1997, but the decline of ranching and timber production caused many families to move, bringing the number of children at the school down to 62 by the year 2000. Annual federal timber payments to the city of Monument declined from $100,000 in 1990 to $5,000 in 2000. With a population of 165 in 2000, Monument had "a grocery store, restaurant, tavern, three churches, a senior center, fire station and the offices of the Columbia Power Electric Cooperative utility."

== Geography ==
According to the United States Census Bureau, the city has a total area of 0.51 square miles (1.32 km^{2}), all land. By road, Monument is 110 miles (180 km) southwest of Pendleton, about 64 miles (103 km) northwest of John Day, and about 156 miles (251 km) northeast of Bend.

== Climate ==
This region experiences warm (but not hot) and dry summers, with no average monthly temperatures above 71.6 °F (22.0 °C). According to the Köppen Climate Classification system, Monument has a steppe climate, abbreviated "BSk" on climate maps. An average of about 13 inches (330 mm) of precipitation falls on Monument each year.

Climate data for Monument, Oregon (1991–2020 normals, extremes 1961–2020)
Month	Jan	Feb	Mar	Apr	May	Jun	Jul	Aug	Sep	Oct	Nov	Dec	Year
Record high °F (°C)	69 (21)	74 (23)	85 (29)	95 (35)	102 (39)	110 (43)	116 (47)	115 (46)	109 (43)	96 (36)	84 (29)	70 (21)	116 (47)
Mean daily maximum °F (°C)	44.0 (6.7)	50.3 (10.2)	58.4 (14.7)	65.4 (18.6)	74.2 (23.4)	81.4 (27.4)	93.4 (34.1)	93.6 (34.2)	83.7 (28.7)	67.4 (19.7)	52.6 (11.4)	43.0 (6.1)	67.3 (19.6)
Daily mean °F (°C)	33.6 (0.9)	37.5 (3.1)	44.1 (6.7)	50.0 (10.0)	57.8 (14.3)	64.3 (17.9)	72.3 (22.4)	71.8 (22.1)	62.7 (17.1)	50.6 (10.3)	40.1 (4.5)	33.2 (0.7)	51.5 (10.8)
Mean daily minimum °F (°C)	23.1 (−4.9)	24.7 (−4.1)	29.8 (−1.2)	34.5 (1.4)	41.3 (5.2)	47.1 (8.4)	51.2 (10.7)	50.0 (10.0)	41.7 (5.4)	33.8 (1.0)	27.6 (−2.4)	23.4 (−4.8)	35.7 (2.1)
Record low °F (°C)	−26 (−32)	−21 (−29)	10 (−12)	15 (−9)	21 (−6)	30 (−1)	35 (2)	31 (−1)	23 (−5)	3 (−16)	−15 (−26)	−25 (−32)	−26 (−32)
Average precipitation inches (mm)	1.31 (33)	1.21 (31)	1.56 (40)	1.51 (38)	2.10 (53)	1.48 (38)	0.48 (12)	0.58 (15)	0.58 (15)	1.27 (32)	1.47 (37)	1.58 (40)	15.13 (384)
Source: NOAA

== Demographics ==
Historical population
Census	Pop.	Note	%±
1910	119		—
1920	147		23.5%
1930	97		−34.0%
1940	118		21.6%
1950	228		93.2%
1960	214		−6.1%
1970	161		−24.8%
1980	192		19.3%
1990	162		−15.6%
2000	151		−6.8%
2010	128		−15.2%
2020	115		−10.2%
U.S. Decennial Census

=== 2020 census ===
As of the 2020 census, Monument had a population of 115. The median age was 48.8 years. 16.5% of residents were under the age of 18 and 28.7% of residents were 65 years of age or older. For every 100 females there were 113.0 males, and for every 100 females age 18 and over there were 128.6 males age 18 and over.

0% of residents lived in urban areas, while 100.0% lived in rural areas.

There were 67 households in Monument, of which 38.8% had children under the age of 18 living in them. Of all households, 31.3% were married-couple households, 32.8% were households with a male householder and no spouse or partner present, and 25.4% were households with a female householder and no spouse or partner present. About 38.8% of all households were made up of individuals and 20.9% had someone living alone who was 65 years of age or older.

There were 74 housing units, of which 9.5% were vacant. Among occupied housing units, 55.2% were owner-occupied and 44.8% were renter-occupied. The homeowner vacancy rate was <0.1% and the rental vacancy rate was <0.1%.

Racial composition as of the 2020 census
Race	Number	Percent
White	99	86.1%
Black or African American	0	0%
American Indian and Alaska Native	0	0%
Asian	0	0%
Native Hawaiian and Other Pacific Islander	0	0%
Some other race	5	4.3%
Two or more races	11	9.6%
Hispanic or Latino (of any race)	12	10.4%

=== 2010 census ===
As of the census of 2010, there were 128 people, 55 households, and 31 families residing in the city. The population density was 251.0 inhabitants per square mile (96.9/km^{2}). There were 82 housing units at an average density of 160.8 per square mile (62.1/km^{2}). The racial makeup of the city was 94.5% White, 0.8% Native American, 3.9% from other races, and 0.8% from two or more races. Hispanic or Latino of any race were 3.9% of the population. There were 55 households, of which 29.1% had children under the age of 18 living with them, 43.6% were married couples living together, 9.1% had a female householder with no husband present, 3.6% had a male householder with no wife present, and 43.6% were non-families. 38.2% of all households were made up of individuals, and 12.7% had someone living alone who was 65 years of age or older. The average household size was 2.33 and the average family size was 3.23.

The median age in the city was 40.5 years. 24.2% of residents were under the age of 18; 5.6% were between the ages of 18 and 24; 26.6% were from 25 to 44; 27.4% were from 45 to 64; and 16.4% were 65 years of age or older. The gender makeup of the city was 54.7% male and 45.3% female.

=== 2000 census ===
As of the census of 2000, there were 151 people, 68 households, and 41 families residing in the city. The population density was 281.0 inhabitants per square mile (108.5/km^{2}). There were 81 housing units at an average density of 150.7 per square mile (58.2/km^{2}). The racial makeup of the city was 95.36% White, 3.97% Native American, and 0.66% from two or more races.

There were 68 households, out of which 26.5% had children under the age of 18 living with them, 47.1% were married couples living together, 7.4% had a female householder with no husband present, and 39.7% were non-families. 32.4% of all households were made up of individuals, and 11.8% had someone living alone who was 65 years of age or older. The average household size was 2.22 and the average family size was 2.78.

In the city, the population was spread out, with 25.2% under the age of 18, 7.3% from 18 to 24, 27.2% from 25 to 44, 23.8% from 45 to 64, and 16.6% who were 65 years of age or older. The median age was 35 years. For every 100 females, there were 118.8 males. For every 100 females age 18 and over, there were 113.2 males.

The median income for a household in the city was $24,000, and the median income for a family was $45,714. Males had a median income of $38,750 versus $21,250 for females. The per capita income for the city was $15,814. There were 6.8% of families and 17.1% of the population living below the poverty line, including 19.2% of under eighteens and 8.0% of those over 64.

== Transportation ==
- Monument Municipal Airport
