= John Day River =

Tributary of the Columbia River in Oregon, U.S.

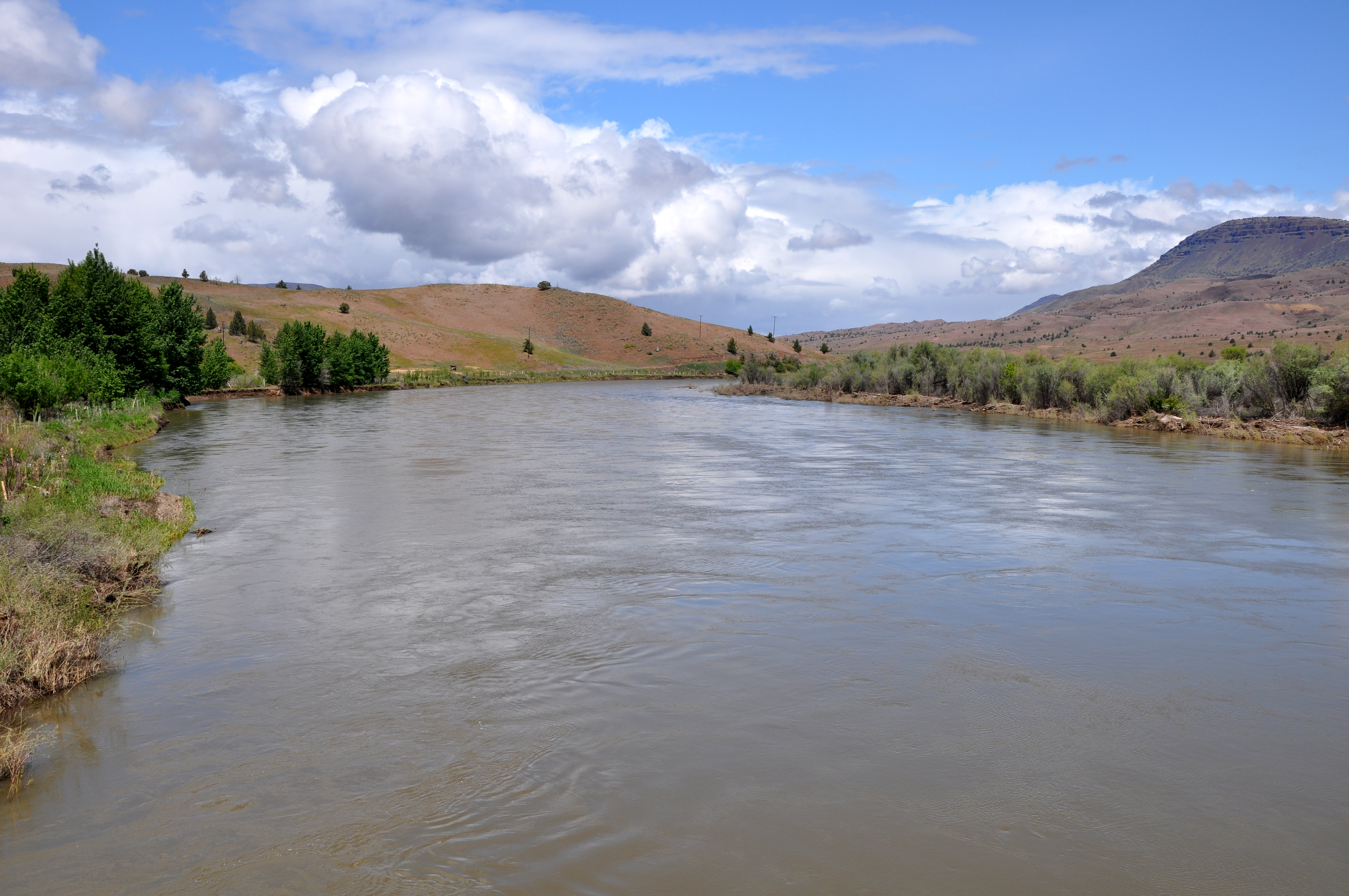
- John Day River at Clarno

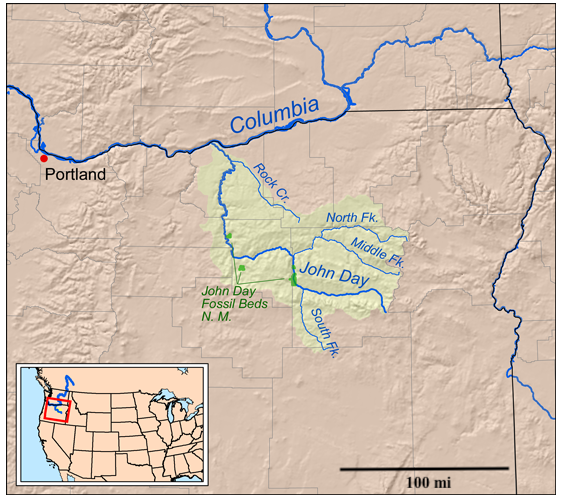
- Map of the John Day watershed
- Etymology: John Day, a hunter and fur trapper
- Native name: Mah-Hah (Cayuse)

Location
- Country: United States
- State: Oregon

Physical characteristics
- Source: Strawberry Mountains
  - location: Malheur National Forest, Grant County
  - coordinates: 44.245439°N 118.5521617°W
  - elevation: 6,681 ft (2,036 m)
- Mouth: Columbia River
  - coordinates: 45.7326252°N 120.6492244°W
  - elevation: 268 ft (82 m)
- Length: 284 mi (457 km)
- Basin size: 8,000 sq mi (21,000 km^{2})
- Discharge
  - location: USGS gage 14048000, McDonald Ferry, river mile 20.9, 45.587778°N 120.408333°W
  - average: 2,075 cu ft/s (58.8 m^{3}/s)
  - minimum: 0 cu ft/s (0 m^{3}/s)
  - maximum: 43,300 cu ft/s (1,230 m^{3}/s)

Basin features
- Tributaries
  - left: South Fork John Day River
  - right: North Fork John Day River

National Wild and Scenic River
- Type: Recreational
- Designated: October 28, 1988

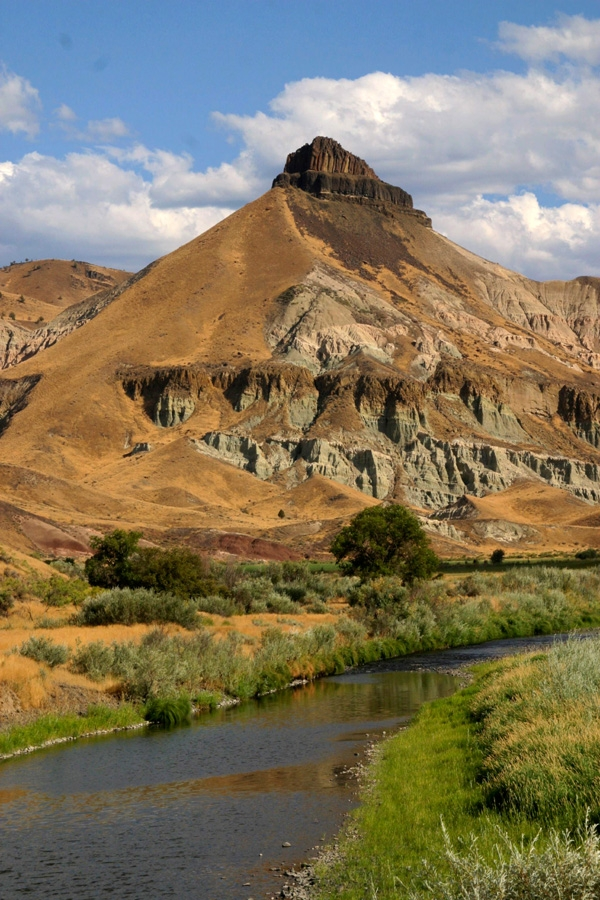
The John Day River passing by Sheep Rock in the John Day Fossil Beds National Monument

The John Day River is a tributary of the Columbia River, approximately 284 miles (457 km) long, in northeastern Oregon in the United States. It is known as the Mah-Hah River by the Cayuse people. Undammed along its entire length, the river is the fourth longest free-flowing river in the contiguous United States. There is extensive use of its waters for irrigation. Its course furnishes habitat for diverse species, including wild steelhead and Chinook salmon runs. However, the steelhead populations are under federal Endangered Species Act (ESA) protections, and the Chinook salmon have been proposed for such protection.

The river was named for John Day, a member of the Pacific Fur Company's overland expedition to the mouth of the Columbia River that left Missouri in 1810. Day struggled through eastern Oregon during the winter of 1811–12. While descending the Columbia River in April 1812, he and Ramsay Crooks were robbed and stripped naked by Native Americans at the mouth of the river that now bears his name, forcing them to hike 80 miles (130 km) back to friendly Umatilla Indians under extreme conditions.

The absence of dams on the river causes its flow to greatly fluctuate throughout the year depending on snowpack and rainfall within the watershed. The highest flow recorded at a gauge on the lower John Day was 43,300 cubic feet per second (1,230 m^{3}/s) on January 2, 1997. The lowest flow was no flow at all, which occurred on September 2, 1966; from August 15 to September 16, 1973; and on nine days in August 1977. The average flow at the gauge is 2,075 cubic feet per second (58.8 m^{3}/s).

== Drainage basin ==
Through its tributaries, the river drains much of the western side of the Blue Mountains, flowing across the sparsely populated arid part of the state east of the Cascade Range in a northwest zigzag, then entering the Columbia upstream from the Columbia River Gorge. It flows through exceptionally scenic canyons in its upper course, with several significant paleontological sites along its banks. Elevations within the watershed range from 268 feet (82 m) at the river's mouth to more than 9,000 feet (2,700 m) in the Strawberry Mountains.

The main branch of the John Day River rises in the Strawberry Mountains in eastern Grant County. The North Fork heads on the western slope of the Elkhorn Mountains in northeastern Grant County. The Middle Fork rises near the crest of the Blue Mountains on the eastern edge of Grant County. The South Fork's source is in northern Harney County, about 10 miles (16 km) south of the Grant County line. The main, south and middle forks each have their heads in different parts of the Malheur National Forest, while the North Fork's source is located in the Wallowa-Whitman National Forest. The main fork flows initially north, then west through the John Day Valley and through the cities of Prairie City, John Day and Mount Vernon. At Dayville, in western Grant County, it is joined from the south by the South Fork John Day River, then flows north through Picture Gorge and the Sheep Rock Unit of the John Day Fossil Beds National Monument.

At Kimberly in northwestern Grant County, it is joined from the east by the North Fork John Day River (which had already joined with the Middle Fork John Day River above Monument, Grant County, Oregon). The river then flows west across Wheeler County. At the county line with Jefferson County it flows north, past the Clarno Unit of the John Day Fossil Beds National Monument. As it approaches the Columbia River in north-central Oregon, it flows in an increasingly meandering course, forming the boundary between Sherman County to the west and Gilliam County to the east.

The John Day River joins the Columbia from the southeast approximately 16 miles (26 km) northeast of Biggs. The mouth of the river is on the narrow Lake Umatilla reservoir, formed on the Columbia by the John Day Dam, approximately 2 miles (3.2 km) downstream from the mouth of the John Day.

== Recreation and ecosystem ==
The John Day is navigable by rafts and other small river craft by boaters who obtain permits provided by the Bureau of Land Management.

Its lower course is used for irrigation of cropland and ranching. In 1988, the United States Congress designated 147.5 miles (237.4 km) of the river from Service Creek to Tumwater Falls as Wild and Scenic for its recreational opportunities. The segment of the river is a popular destination for anadromous steelhead and warm water bass fishing, as well as whitewater rafting.

In addition to wild spring chinook salmon and bass, the river furnishes habitat for Columbia River redband trout, bull trout, and westslope cutthroat trout. There are no hatchery salmon or steelhead released in the John Day River.

== See also ==
- List of rivers of Oregon
- List of longest streams of Oregon
- List of National Wild and Scenic Rivers
- Lost Blue Bucket Mine, a lost mine believed to be somewhere on the John Day

== Works cited ==
- Columbia-Blue Mountain Resource Conservation & Development Area (March 15, 2005). "John Day Subbasin Plan: Revised Draft Plan" (PDF). Northwest Power and Conservation Council. Archived from the original (PDF) on April 9, 2013.
