= List of mountain ranges of Oregon =

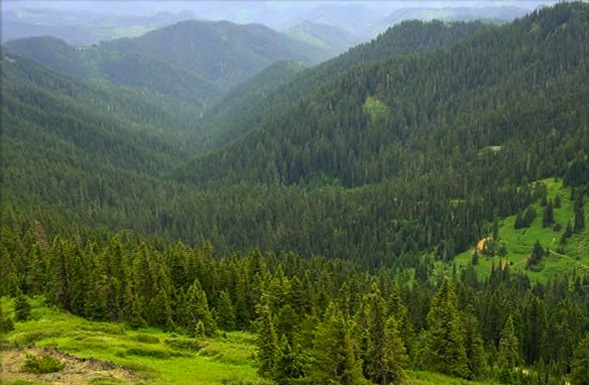
The Calapooya Mountains in Lane County

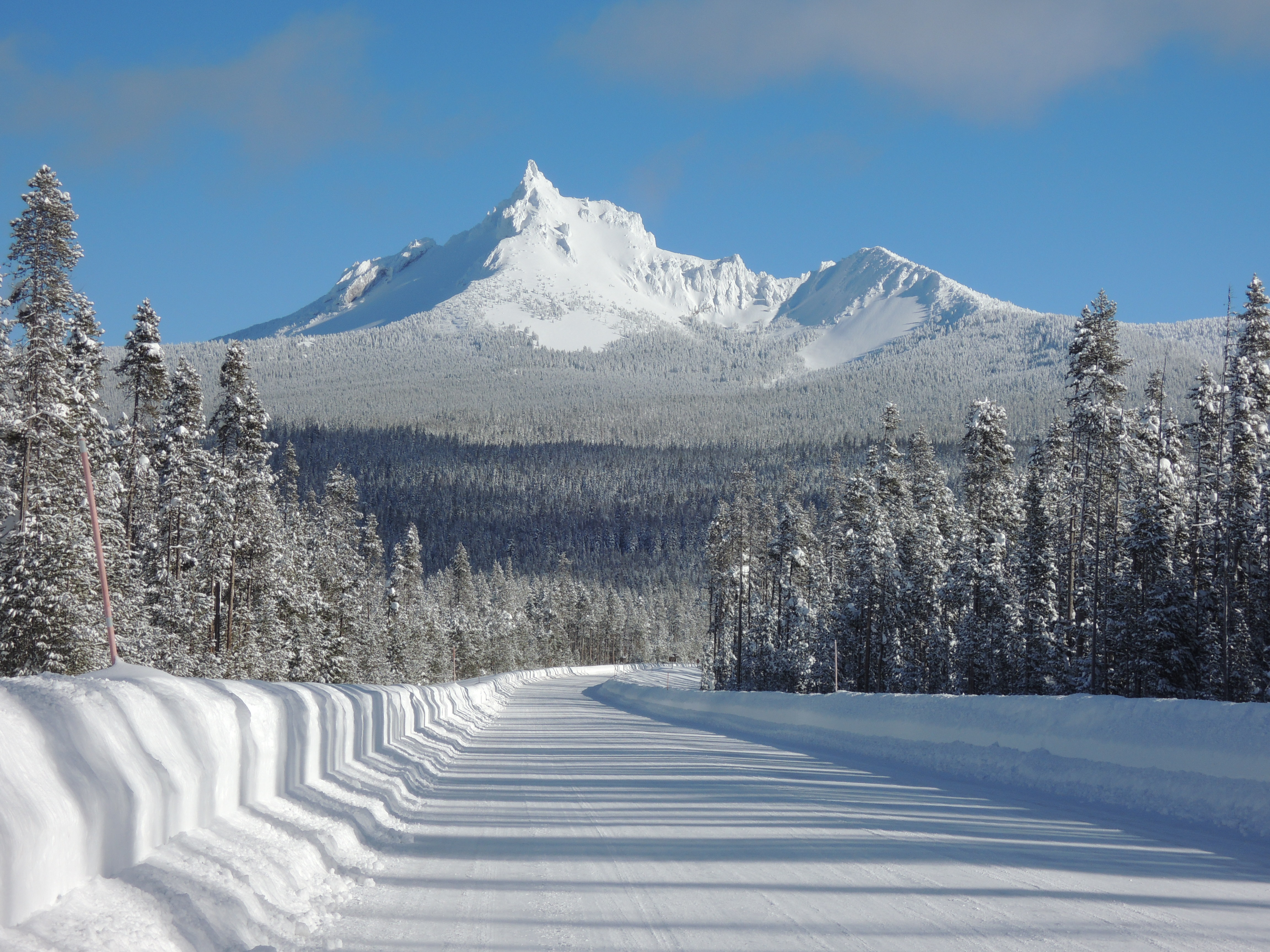
Mount Thielsen in the Cascade Range in southern Oregon

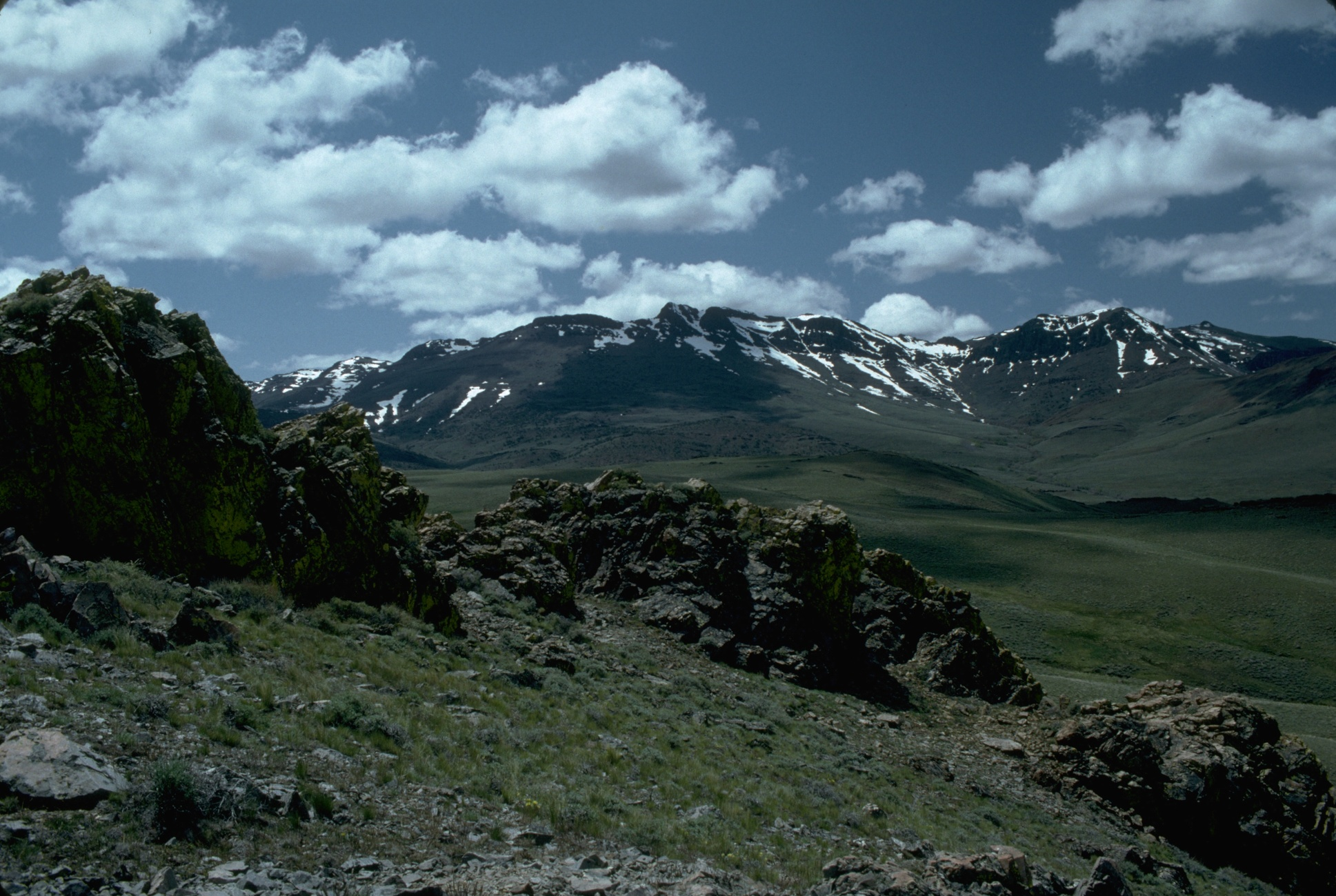
The Pueblo Mountains south of Fields

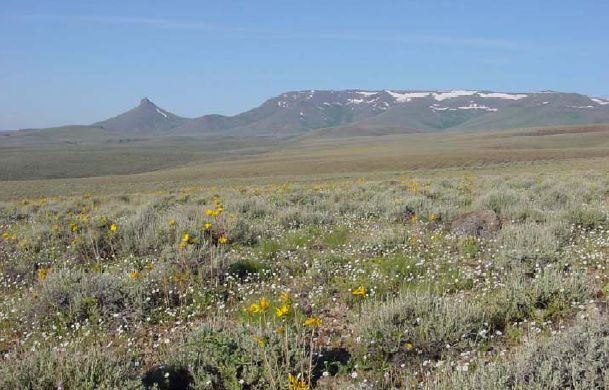
Trout Creek Mountains, Southeastern Oregon

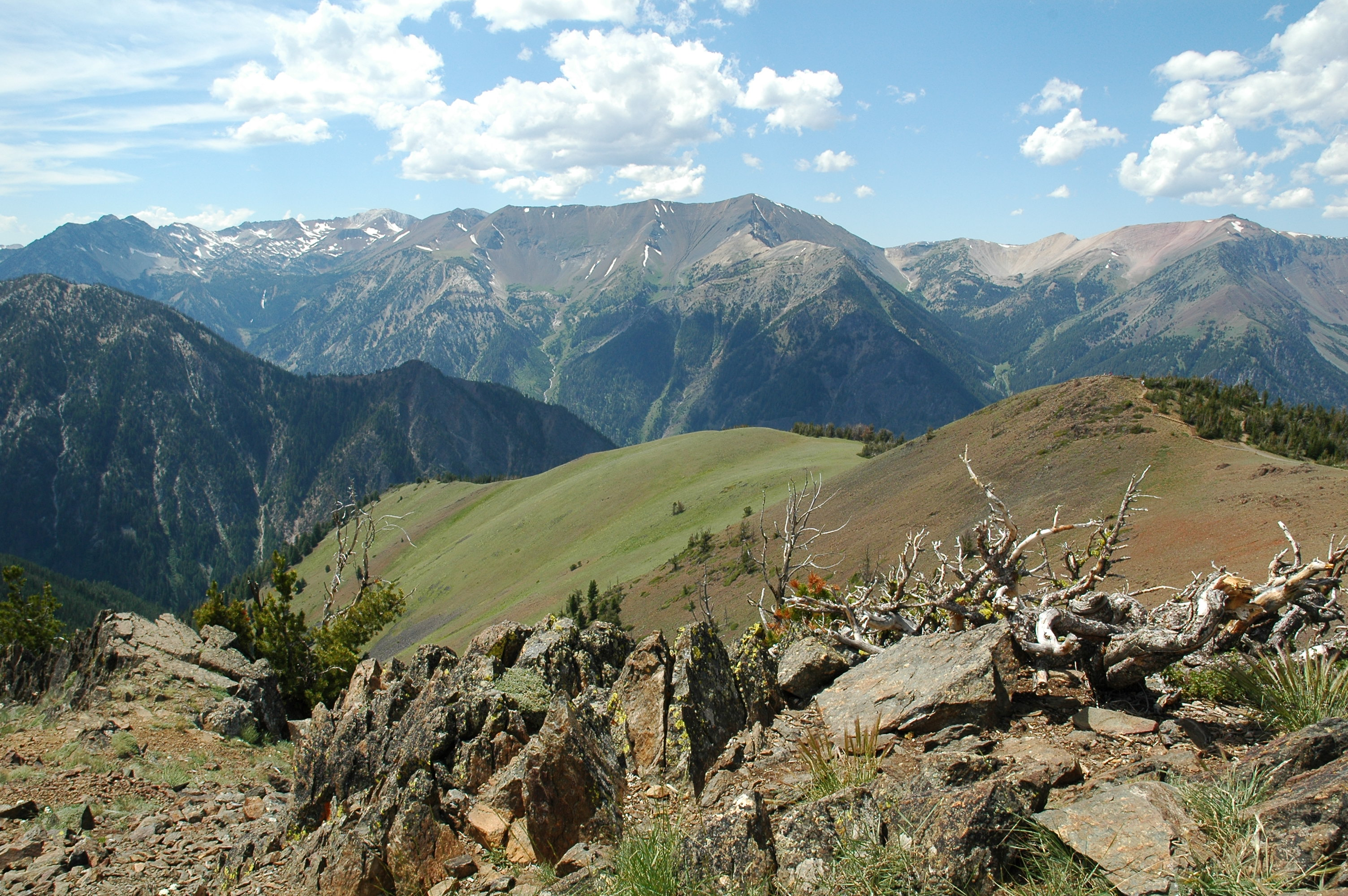
The Wallowa Mountains in northeastern Oregon

There are at least 50 named mountain ranges in the U.S. state of Oregon. Many of these ranges extend into the neighboring states of California, Idaho, Nevada, and Washington. Elevations and coordinates are from the U.S. Geological Survey, Geographic Names Information System, unless otherwise indicated.

range	county	elevation		coordinate	GNIS citation
range	county	ft	m	coordinate	GNIS citation
Aldrich Mountains	Grant County, Oregon	6,214	1,894	44°18′55″N 119°18′29″W	
Bilk Creek Mountains	Harney County, Oregon	5,535	1,687	41°40′28″N 118°19′25″W	
Black Hills	Lake County, Oregon	5,111	1,558	43°10′10″N 120°40′48″W	
Blue Mountains	Union County, Oregon	9,108	2,776	45°30′00″N 118°00′05″W	
Buck Mountain	Crook County, Oregon	5,213	1,589	43°42′52″N 119°48′44″W	
Calapooya Mountains	Douglas County, Oregon	3,996	1,218	43°29′59″N 122°30′04″W	
Canby Mountains	Klamath County, Oregon	4,938	1,505	42°31′29″N 121°49′29″W	
Cardwell Hills	Benton County, Oregon	1,952	595	44°38′34″N 123°22′24″W	
Cascade Range or The Cascades or Oregon Cascades	Marion County, Oregon	14,409	4,392	46°51′10″N 121°45′37″W	
Chehalem Mountains	Yamhill County, Oregon	1,325	404	45°22′34″N 123°02′14″W	
Coast Ranges					
Coburg Hills	Lane County, Oregon	1,299	396	44°10′23″N 122°55′29″W	
Coleman Hills	Lake County, Oregon	5,102	1,555	42°47′50″N 120°04′54″W	
Connley Hills	Lake County, Oregon	5,269	1,606	43°15′29″N 121°00′34″W	
Cottonwood Mountain	Malheur County, Oregon	6,476	1,974	44°10′07″N 117°39′44″W	
Coyote Hills	Baker County, Oregon	3,671	1,119	44°55′15″N 117°54′04″W	
Crooked Creek Range	Malheur County, Oregon	4,206	1,282	42°34′00″N 118°02′38″W	
Crowcamp Hills	Harney County, Oregon	5,617	1,712	43°31′30″N 118°30′09″W	
Elkhorn Mountains	Baker County, Oregon	9,108	2,776	44°52′20″N 118°11′34″W	
Eola Hills	Yamhill County, Oregon	833	254	45°04′31″N 123°07′25″W	
Farley Hills	Baker County, Oregon	4,022	1,226	44°57′55″N 117°48′14″W	
Gage Range	Wheeler County, Oregon	2,723	830	44°34′52″N 120°16′23″W	
Grampian Hills	Klamath County, Oregon	6,037	1,840	42°16′45″N 122°05′04″W	
Grassy Range	Jackson County, Oregon	5,157	1,572	42°53′19″N 122°41′04″W	
Greenhorn Mountains	Grant County, Oregon	8,100	2,500	44°42′50″N 118°33′39″W	
Hagerhorst Mountains	Klamath County, Oregon	6,781	2,067	42°28′30″N 120°55′04″W	
Horse Range	Josephine County, Oregon	2,001	610	42°39′36″N 123°41′34″W	
Hot Spring Hills	Malheur County, Oregon	4,744	1,446	42°04′50″N 117°45′07″W	
Klamath Mountains	Siskiyou County, California	4,416	1,346	42°00′00″N 123°20′04″W	
Maury Mountains	Crook County, Oregon	6,050	1,840	44°01′58″N 120°25′06″W	
Mosquito Mountain	Washoe County, Nevada	6,421	1,957	41°54′03″N 119°48′24″W	
Mutton Mountains	Wasco County, Oregon	4,091	1,247	44°56′51″N 121°10′36″W	
Ochoco Mountains	Crook County, Oregon	5,489	1,673	44°26′35″N 120°23′37″W	
Oregon Canyon Mountains	Malheur County, Oregon	6,437	1,962	42°10′00″N 117°57′34″W	
Owyhee Mountains	Owyhee County, Idaho	8,386	2,556	42°58′51″N 116°39′31″W	
Paulina Mountains	Deschutes County, Oregon	7,969	2,429	43°41′21″N 121°15′17″W	
Pueblo Mountains	Harney County, Oregon	6,716	2,047	42°06′15″N 118°43′28″W	
Red Hills of Dundee	Yamhill County, Oregon	820	250	45°17′08″N 123°03′07″W	
Rogue River Range	Jackson County, Oregon	2,405	733	42°45′52″N 122°40′04″W	
Sage Hen Hills	Humboldt County, Nevada	6,073	1,851	41°57′14″N 119°16′02″W	
Salem Hills	Marion County, Oregon	823	251	44°50′35″N 123°04′06″W	
Sand Hills	Harney County, Oregon	4,183	1,275	42°01′30″N 118°35′14″W	
Sheepshead Mountains	Malheur County, Oregon	5,590	1,700	42°53′37″N 118°08′42″W	
Siskiyou Mountains	Jackson County, Oregon	7,536	2,297	41°49′59″N 123°40′04″W	
Strawberry Range	Grant County, Oregon	9,042	2,756	44°18′30″N 118°35′04″W	
Trout Creek Mountains (southern boundary of Alvord Basin)	Harney County, Oregon	7,060	2,150	42°06′00″N 118°17′34″W	
Virtue Hills	Baker County, Oregon	4,692	1,430	44°44′40″N 117°42′49″W	
Wallowa Mountains	Wallowa County, Oregon	9,838	2,999	45°12′00″N 117°19′04″W	
Whiskey Hills	Lake County, Oregon	5,515	1,681	42°58′50″N 120°30′09″W	
White Horse Mountains	Harney County, Oregon	4,616	1,407	42°13′00″N 118°30′05″W	

== See also ==
- List of mountains of Oregon
- Lists of Oregon-related topics
- List of mountain ranges of California
- List of mountain ranges of Nevada
- Outline of the Cascade Range
