= Kings River (Nevada) =

River in Nevada and Oregon, United States

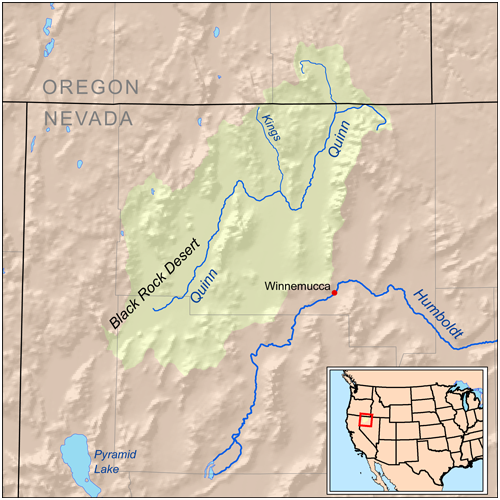
- Quinn River watershed, including Kings River watershed

Location
- Country: United States
- State: Nevada, Oregon

Physical characteristics
- Source: west of Disaster Peak
  - location: The Granites, Humboldt County, Nevada, Nevada
  - coordinates: 41°59′05″N 118°13′36″W
  - elevation: 8,382 ft (2,555 m)
- Mouth: Quinn River
  - location: Quinn River Lakes, Humboldt County, Nevada, Nevada
  - coordinates: 41°30′54″N 118°08′55″W
  - elevation: 4,114 ft (1,254 m)
- Length: 40 mi (64 km)

The Kings River is a tributary of the Quinn River, about 40 mi (64 km) long, in northwestern Nevada and south-central Oregon in the United States. It drains a remote arid area of the northwestern Great Basin.

== Description ==
The river rises in northern Humboldt County, Nevada, west of Disaster Peak in The Granites, part of the Trout Creek Mountains, near the Oregon state line. Flowing northwest, it crosses briefly into Harney County, Oregon, then turns sharply south and re-enters Humboldt County for the rest of its course. It flows generally south between the Bilk Creek Mountains on the right (west) and the Montana Mountains, then the Double H Mountains on the left. It joins the Quinn River from the north at Quinn River Lakes. The Quinn River flows southwest from the lake to end in a sink in the Black Rock Desert west of Winnemucca.

== See also ==
- List of rivers of Nevada
- List of rivers of Oregon
- List of rivers of the Great Basin
