= Canby =

Canby may refer to:

== People ==
- Canby (surname)

== Places ==
In the United States

- Canby, California
- Canby, Iowa
- Canby, Minnesota
- Canby, Oregon
- Canby Creek, a stream in Minnesota
- Canby Mountain, a summit in Colorado
- Canby Mountains, Oregon
