= Double H =

Double H may refer to:

- Double "H" Ranch, a year-round program for children and families faced with life-threatening or chronic illnesses
- Double H High Adventure Base, the newest National High Adventure program of the Boy Scouts of America
- Double-H Boots, a manufacturer of western footwear

== See also ==
- Double H Mountains
- HH (disambiguation)
