= Thacker Pass lithium mine =

Proposed mining of hectorite clay deposit in Nevada

- Location within Nevada
- Location: Nevada, United States; 41°42′30.25″N 118°03′17.12″W
- Products: Lithium
- Production: 66,000 tons per year (projected)
- Greatest depth: 400 feet (120 m)
- Opened: Not yet operational
- Company: Lithium Americas
- Website: Official website

The Thacker Pass lithium mine is a lithium clay mining development project in Humboldt County, Nevada, which is the largest known lithium deposit in the US and one of the largest in the world, and is believed by some to have the potential to supply up to 25% of the world's lithium demand. There has been significant exploration of Thacker Pass since 2007. The Bureau of Land Management issued a Record of Decision approving development of the mine in January 2021. Construction began in March 2023 after an emergency appeal was denied by the 9th Circuit Court of Appeals. The project site would cover 18,000 acres (7,300 ha), with less than 6,000 acres (2,400 ha) of that being mined, on a site 21 miles (34 km) west-northwest of Orovada, Nevada within the McDermitt Caldera. The mine is a project of Lithium Nevada, LLC, a wholly owned subsidiary of Lithium Americas Corp. In late January 2023, car giant General Motors announced it would invest $650M in the mine project, giving GM exclusive access to the first phase of production. In February 2023, when the initial $320 million investment was completed, GM became Lithium Americas's largest shareholder and offtake partner. At full capacity the mine would produce 66,000 tons annually, equivalent to 25% of global demand for lithium in 2021, which was expected to triple over the next five years. Development of the mine is driven by increasing demand for lithium used in electric vehicle batteries and grid storage of intermittently generated electricity from sources such as solar power or wind power.

The project has met resistance in the form of legal challenges and direct action. While several Indigenous tribes with traditional homeland in the area support the project some nearby tribes oppose the project. These opposition tribes have stated that Thacker Pass is a sacred site, a massacre site, and that they were not adequately consulted by the Bureau of Land Management. No BLM study or cultural mining study has found evidence of the massacre site within the mining area or even the extended area. Additionally, opponents of the mine have voiced concerns about rushed environmental review, threats to critical wildlife habitat, disruption of cultural sites. Proponents of the mine have stated that the project is necessary to limit climate change by reducing carbon emissions from American cars, is benign in its social and environmental impact, and will create 300 long-term jobs in rural Nevada, paying an average of $63,000 per year. The New York Times reported that controversy around the mine is "emblematic of a fundamental tension" between green energy and damage caused by resource extraction required for those technologies.

== Ownership ==
In February 2023, General Motors (GM) completed an initial $320 million investment, becoming Lithium Americas's largest shareholder and offtake partner. In 2024, GM invested a further $625 million, giving it a 38% stake, with the right to buy all lithium produced by the mine's first phase. In October 2025, Lithium Americas announced that the US Department of Energy had taken a 5% stake in the mine.

== Resources ==
The Thacker Pass lithium deposit has measured and indicated resources of 13.7 million tonnes of lithium carbonate equivalent, at an average ore grade of 2,231 ppm (0.22%) lithium. The Thacker Pass volcano-sedimentary deposit is the largest known sedimentary lithium resource in the U.S.

Lithium Americas estimates that the site contains recoverable lithium worth $3.9 billion. It is estimated that enough batteries for about a million electric vehicles a year could be mined.

=== Mining and extraction process ===
Thacker Pass would use a newly developed process to extract lithium from the clay deposit. Usually lithium is mined by either hard rock mining or brine mining. This mine will use hydraulic shovels to remove the clay and turn it into a slurry. Non-lithium-containing sand and rock will be separated and immediately returned to the pit.The lithium-bearing clay slurry would be mixed with sulfuric acid to extract the metal. A plant would be built on-site to burn molten sulfur and produce sulfuric acid, which is safer than transporting sulfuric acid, and would result in one third the number of truckloads necessary. Sulfur is a byproduct from oil refineries, and may be sourced from as far away as the Alberta oil sands. The facility would produce 5,800 tons of sulfuric acid per day, requiring 75 semi-trucks of molten sulfur to be delivered daily from Winnemucca. Burning the sulfur to produce sulfuric acid is an exothermic reaction, allowing the plant to generate most of its own electricity.

After the slurry is reacted with sulfuric acid, it will be pressed through filters which separate the elemental lithium solution, and then processed into lithium carbonate or lithium hydroxide for batteries. The tailings will then be returned to the pit. (The mine will use a process called "block mining", whereby previously excavated sections get filled with tailings as the operation progresses.)

The mine is planned to operate for 46 years, with the first 20 years removing material above the water table, with Lithium Americas intending to conduct studies over a decade on the water flows around the pit in hopes of proposing a safe method for mining below the water table (for which they are not yet permitted to conduct.)

== Background ==
=== Global demand and US deposits ===
Development of the lithium mine is driven by increasing demand for lithium used in electric vehicle batteries and for grid storage of intermittently generated electricity from sources such as solar power or wind power. As of 2021 lithium demand is expected to triple over the next 5 years, increase tenfold by 2030, and potentially increase 50-fold by 2040. The US government is concerned that, as of 2021, almost all the lithium used in the US is imported, which the Department of Energy says is a "strategic vulnerability". The Biden administration policy sees the United States securing a larger share of the lithium-battery supply chain through "safe, equitable and sustainable domestic mining ventures".

While the US holds some of the largest known reserves of lithium, the only large-scale US mine producing it (located in Silver Peak, Nevada) makes less than 5,000 tons annually, which is less than 2% of the global supply. Bessemer City mine and Kings Mountain Mine in North Carolina have lithium deposits. As of September 2024, in the United States, there are eight active lithium mines with eleven projects delayed indefinitely or cancelled and fifty-one separate project proposals lie in the exploration or development stages. The majority of proposed and active sites are in the western United States, with concentrations in California and Nevada.

The environmental conflict at Thacker Pass lithium mine is representative of global conflicts arising from increased mineral extraction that would be required to make an energy transition away from fossil fuels in response to climate change. Some opposition groups have expressed concern that a global rush for critical minerals like lithium, nickel, cobalt, and copper could violate their basic rights and endanger their local ecologies and cultural heritage. Some international frontline communities affected by mining have called for a just transition that would prevent or minimise this damage to Indigenous cultures and the environment.

=== Cultural history ===
Thacker Pass is the traditional homeland of several related Indigenous nations, including the Shoshone-Paiute Tribes of the Duck Valley Reservation, the Fort McDermitt Paiute and Shoshone Tribe, Lovelock Paiute Tribe, Fallon Paiute Shoshone Tribe, Pyramid Lake Paiute Tribe and the Reno-Sparks Indian Colony. Local Indigenous communities harvest traditional foods, medicines and supplies for sacred ceremonies in the region. Members of the Fort McDermitt Paiute and Shoshone Tribe have stated that their tribe "descends from essentially two families who, hiding in Thacker Pass, managed to avoid being sent to reservations farther away from our ancestral lands" and hence that this tribe owes its existence to the shelter provided by the Pass.

=== Rotten Moon ===
Thacker Pass is known as Peehee mu'huh by tribal protestors, meaning 'rotten moon'. The name was first publicized in March 2021, by People of Red Mountain, a twelve-strong group formed to oppose the mine. In numerous interviews, group lawyer Will Falk, with members Myron Smart and Daranda Hinkey, recounted a gory massacre of Paiutes.

Those interviews and Falk's July/August 2021 court filings, detailed the butchery of the 'rotten moon' story, but didn't mention who perpetrated the attack leading to speculation on the involvement of soldiers. A tribal elder, Alana Crutcher, refuted the claim Peehee mu'huh was a name used for Thacker Pass and cast doubt on whether the massacre protestors described ever took place. Reporter Molly Wood, who interviewed both Crutcher and Hinkey couldn't substantiate the story despite further research.

In August 2021, Falk unearthed historical records of a cavalry attack in 1865 on Paiutes in the Quinn River Valley claiming it spilled over into Thacker Pass. In November 2021, Falk's court filing for the Reno-Sparks Indian Colony described two separate attacks, with the story of Peehee mu'huh updated to include the Pit River Indians as perpetrators of the massacre in which the Paiute victims were murdered by the enemy tribe and their insides strung out on the sagebrush. The Pit River inter-tribal raid story of 'rotten moon' has been conflated with the documented 1865 attack by soldiers in many reports, including those by local reporters following the court case.

In a December 2023 video, People of Red Mountain's Day Hinkey also said the name Peehee mu'huh derives from an inter-tribal war with the Pit River Tribe. Falk, in an April 2021 conversation with Deep Green Resistance co-founder, Derrick Jensen, said the origin of the name was an enemy tribe attack.

== Mine impacts ==
According to the United States Department of Energy, the Thacker Pass lithium mine could supply enough lithium carbonate for up to 800,000 electric vehicle batteries annually, reducing consumption of gasoline by 317 million gallons per year.

The lithium mine is proposed to be a carbon-neutral operation, generating electric power from a sulfuric acid plant built on-site to leach lithium from the extracted ore. The Final Environmental Impact Statement (FEIS) for the mine estimated Phase 2 emissions at an equivalent of 132,000 tons per year of CO_{2} with an additional 20,000 tons of emissions generated off-site by raw material transportation. The FEIS says approximately 200,000 tons per year of CO_{2} equivalent emissions are avoided in off-site power generation in Phase 2 by producing carbon-free electricity at the mine.

Phase 1 water consumption is estimated at 2,600 acre feet per year, the equivalent of approximately five alfalfa irrigation pivots of well water. The mine would consume 5,200 acre feet of water annually in Phase 2, equivalent to 1.7 billion gallons. The proposed transfer of water rights from Quinn River Valley crop irrigation to the mine site prompted a protest from a local rancher who claimed the diversion was detrimental to the Bartell Ranch operation and against the public interest. The protest was overruled on February 9, 2023, by the Nevada State Engineer, who developed an independent groundwater flow model to estimate the impacts of the mine on local water resources.

The mine overlaps with 2,866 acres (1,160 ha) of big sagebrush habitat and known golden eagle breeding sites. The project may be disruptive to the habitat of Endangered Species Act-listed animals. A coalition of environmental groups filing a lawsuit against the mine stated that Thacker Pass is "critically important to wildlife because it connects the Double H Mountains to the Montana Mountains" and "provides lower-elevation habitat that wildlife need to survive the winter." However, the environmentalist groups lost the battle in court and the mine has been allowed to proceed. The group also stated that the area constituted "one of the last big blocks of the sagebrush sea free of development."

Additional environmental concerns include contamination from groundwater pollutants such as arsenic, air pollution from sulfuric acid leaching of lithium from clay sediments, and changes in the connectivity of groundwater and surface water systems. This could harm the habitat of the endangered Lahontan cutthroat trout and the Kings River pyrg (Pyrgulopsis imperialis), a rare springsnail not known to live anywhere else in the world.

There are concerns about the mine's potential impacts on the safety of local communities: projects that bring a large predominately male workforce from outside the local area can generate local increases in drug use and violent crime, and are associated with violence against Indigenous women.

== Regulatory approval and litigation ==
=== Bureau of Land Management ===
In August 2019, Lithium Americas lodged a Plan of Operations for its proposed lithium clay mining development project with the Bureau of Land Management (BLM), the federal mining regulator. In January 2020, the company announced the publication of a Notice of Intent to prepare an Environmental Impact Statement for the Thacker Pass lithium project. On January 15, 2021, BLM issued their Record of Decision approving the Thacker Pass Lithium Mine.

Opponents of the mine claim the environmental review was rushed, because what is normally a multi-year review process was completed in less than a year. During the permitting process for the proposed Thacker Pass lithium mine in 2020, the BLM consultation with the Fort McDermitt Paiute and Shoshone Tribe, the Summit Lake Paiute tribe, and the Western Winnemucca Indian Colony resulted in no issue concerning historic property within areas of potential disturbance. Other tribes were not consulted during the review process, leading the Burns Paiute Tribe and the Reno-Sparks Indian Colony to intervene in a lawsuit against the BLM and Lithium Nevada Corporation in July 2021.

In early February 2021, a local rancher filed a lawsuit against the BLM over concerns about the project's water use. On February 26, 2021, four environmental non-profits (Western Watersheds Project, Great Basin Resource Watch, Basin and Range Watch, and Wildlands Defense) also filed a lawsuit challenging the BLM's permitting of the project, claiming threats to sage grouse habitat, old growth sagebrush, golden eagle nests, endemic springsnails, and Endangered Species Act–listed Lahontan cutthroat trout, bighorn sheep, and pygmy rabbits. These opponents of the mine have claimed that the review process was rushed and that the public input process was questionable.

Regional Indigenous tribes have intervened in the lawsuits against the BLM and Lithium Nevada Corporation. Reno-Sparks Indian Colony requested that the BLM consult them about the mine, stating in a letter that "Just because regional tribes have been isolated and forced onto reservations relatively far away from Thacker Pass does not mean these regional tribes do not possess cultural connections to the Pass." When the BLM rejected this request for consultation, Reno Sparks Indian Colony, Burns Paiute Tribe, and a committee of Fort McDermitt Tribal members calling themselves People of Red Mountain intervened in the lawsuits. People of Red Mountain is not a federally recognized tribe so it has no legal standing. The tribes are demanding consultation under the Archaeological Resource Protection Act.

The Fort McDermitt Tribal Council initially had a project engagement agreement with Lithium Americas but the council withdrew from that agreement and agreed to sue the Bureau of Land Management for violations of the National Historic Preservation Act after a petition organized by the People of Red Mountain. This lawsuit was never filed.

In July 2021, Chief United States District Judge Miranda Du ruled that Lithium America may excavate archaeological trenches at the site, as the environmental groups could not show irreparable harm would be caused by the digging. The digging was less than 1/4 acre and was used to determine whether cultural artifacts exist within the proposed project area.

In September 2021, Judge Du also ruled against tribes' claims that a historical massacre occurred in Thacker Pass and refused to grant their request for a preliminary injunction to stop excavation for cultural resources. She stated that while she found their spiritual distress persuasive, they did not show sufficiently specific irreparable harm. Judge Du also stated that "the evidence before the Court does not support [plaintiffs'] claims...the 1868 field notes do not show a massacre happened within the Project area."

On October 5, 2021, Tribal lawyers filed a motion asking the judge to reconsider the opinion that the massacre did not occur at Thacker Pass. This motion was denied on November 8, and the judge stated: "the proffered newly discovered evidence is too speculative to support an irreparable harm finding".

The Archeological Resources Protection permit, issued in September 2021, required additional approval and on December 16, 2021, the Bureau of Land Management signed off on the final Field Work Authorization allowing excavation work to proceed in Thacker Pass. On December 17, 2021, a letter was delivered to the people of Red Mountain notifying the group that Falk and co-counsel Terry Lodge planned on filing a motion to withdraw as attorneys on January 7, 2022, citing irreconcilable differences. On January 3, 2022, the Reno-Sparks Indian Colony, the remaining tribe represented in the lawsuit by Falk and Lodge, applied, alongside the Burns Paiute Tribe, to the 9th Circuit Court of Appeals for reconsideration of previous preliminary injunction requests that would have prevented the now fully permitted digging from going ahead. The stay pending the appeal was denied by Chief Judge Miranda Du of the District Court of Nevada on January 12, 2022.

On January 26, 2022, Falk, Lodge, and local counsel Julie Cavanaugh-Bill were formally granted withdrawal as attorneys for the People of Red Mountain. Cavanaugh-Bill also withdrew from representing the Reno Sparks Indian Colony. The next day, an article describing the acrimonious split, stated that the People of Red Mountain fired Falk because Falk and Wilbert, co-founders of 'Protect Thacker Pass', are also members of Deep Green Resistance (DGR), and there were concerns over DGR's beliefs about transgenderism. Further articles followed on the rift.

On February 11, 2022, the Winnemucca Indian Colony filed a motion to intervene in the lawsuits, claiming lack of consultation prior to the January 15, 2021 Record of Decision. The BLM's communications to the local tribes, including the Winnemucca Indian Colony began in 2019 according to court filings. The 320-acre colony (130 ha) has been the center of a decades-long fight concerning its council's legitimacy, tribal membership eligibility disputes and legal cases involving the Bureau of Indian Affairs, the tribal council and colony residents.

On March 11, 2022, the District Court of Nevada denied the Winnemucca Indian Colony's motion to intervene in the lawsuits. Judge Du ruled that the motion was untimely, prejudicial to other parties and that Winnemucca Indian Colony should have acted much sooner if they believed their interests might be adversely affected.

In March 2022, a magistrate judge ordered that if People of Red Mountain failed to obtain counsel by May 2, 2022, the court will recommend that their claims be dismissed. No new counsel had appeared before the court by that date, resulting in a magistrate judge issuing a Report and Recommendation to dismiss the group's claims without prejudice.

On April 4, 2022, the Reno-Sparks Indian Colony and Burns Paiute Tribe dropped their appeal to the United States Ninth Circuit for reconsideration of previous preliminary injunction requests.

In October 2022, the Fort McDermitt Paiute and Shoshone Tribe signed a Community Benefits Agreement (CBA) with Lithium Americas establishing a collaborative framework and defining the long-term benefits for the tribe. The Fort McDermitt Paiute and Shoshone Tribe, are located 35 miles (56 km) north of Thacker Pass and the closest Native American community to the project.

On February 6, 2023, U.S. District Judge Miranda Du denied the majority of the protestors claims leaving the way forward for mine construction to commence. Judge Du ruled that BLM's outreach to local tribes "was reasonable and made in good faith based on the information BLM had at the time it initiated consultation". An appeal was lodged against the ruling in the 9th Circuit Court with a subsequent emergency injunction denied requesting the halting of construction work pending the appeal.

On February 16, 2023, the two tribes appealing the ruling, along with the Summit Lake Paiute Tribe, filed a new federal lawsuit alleging BLM withheld information and that the permitting process was flawed.

On July 17, 2023, the 9th U.S. Circuit Court of Appeals denied the bid to block construction of the lithium mine, deferring to the expertise of the Bureau of Land Management and the decision made by U.S. District Judge Miranda Du to allow construction to go forward.

In November 2023, Judge Du dismissed the second lawsuit brought by the three tribes but left open the possibility of an amended filing, stating: "given that the Court has now twice agreed with Federal Defendants...and Plaintiffs did not vary their argument at all the second time...the Court is skeptical that Plaintiffs could successfully amend it. But skeptical does not mean futile".

On 12 December 2023, the second case was dismissed with prejudice after the three tribes failed to submit an amended complaint within the required thirty days.

=== Nevada state environmental permits ===
On February 25, 2022, the Nevada Division of Environmental Protection (NDEP) issued three permits for the Thacker Pass lithium mine.

1. Air Pollution Control Permit.
2. Water Pollution Control Permit.
3. Mining Reclamation Permit.

Lithium Americas stated that these were the final state-level permits necessary for the project. The Water Pollution Control Permit, which only allows Lithium Nevada to mine above the water table, was challenged in March 2022 by an environmental group, Great Basin Resource Watch (GBRW), who filed an appeal with the Nevada State Environmental Commission (SEC). On June 28, 2022, the SEC five-member panel voted to affirm NDEP's approval of the Water Pollution Control Permit.

=== Federal eagle take permit ===
On March 8, 2022, the U.S. Fish and Wildlife Service published its Record of Decision for Lithium Nevada Corporation's (LNC) Eagle Take Permit Application and Eagle Conservation Plan. The Final Environmental Impact Statement (FEIS) found three occupied golden eagle territories overlapping the project area and a fourth closely adjoining it. No eagle nests were found within the Thacker Pass mine project area, and the USFWS intend to issue an eagle incidental take permit to LNC relating to noise disturbance in a territory encompassing Thacker Canyon.

== Protests ==
Two members of Deep Green Resistance (DGR), a radical environmental group, began occupying Thacker Pass on January 15, 2021, the day the Record of Decision was issued for the proposed mine. Max Wilbert and attorney Will Falk set up the 'Protect Thacker Pass' camp, supported by DGR funding, to oppose construction of the lithium mine.

Mine opponents have concerns about the lack of free, prior, and informed Indigenous consent for the project; destruction of sacred sites and hunting and gathering areas; and greenwashing of the project.

On April 10, 2021, over 60 people from different reservations in the region came to Thacker Pass to demonstrate their opposition to the mine by praying, dancing, and sharing food with local people and protesters occupying the site. Indigenous people attending that event said there were sacred sites in the area including burials and also a massacre site from which the location derives its name in the Paiute language. They also demonstrated concerns about public health, water quality, air quality, and lack of Indigenous consent for the project.

On June 12, 2021, hundreds of people attended a rally in Reno, Nevada to protest the Thacker Pass lithium mine.

In January 2022, Gary McKinney, a spokesperson for the People of Red Mountain, said they had recently removed their protest camp from Thacker Pass and split from joint opposition with Falk and Wilbert over concerns regarding their links to Deep Green Resistance. Ian Bigley, Mining Justice Organizer for the Progressive Leadership Alliance (PLAN) of Nevada, who visited the 'Protect Thacker Pass' camp, said that he felt misled regarding its ties with DGR, and that the association was hindering donations opposing the mine. Kelly Fuller, then Energy and Mining Campaign Director for the Western Watersheds Project, one of the environmental groups suing the BLM over the project, also commented on the cost of having DGR involved. Wilbert and Falk took down their protest camp after the BLM fined the two men for trespassing and digging latrines at the site in September 2021.

On July 13, 2023, Lithium Americas sued a group of environmentalists that allegedly engaged in: Civil conspiracy, Nuisance, Trespass, Tortious Interference with Contractual Relations, Tortious Interference with Prospective Economic Advantage, and Unjust Enrichment.

== Responses ==
The New York Times reported that "the fight over the Nevada mine is emblematic of a fundamental tension surfacing around the world: Electric cars and renewable energy may not be as green as they appear".

In May, 2021, a group of Fort McDermitt Paiute-Shoshone tribal members, calling themselves People of Red Mountain, petitioned the United States Department of the Interior and others to halt construction of the lithium mine at Thacker Pass. Their petition states that Thacker Pass is a massacre site, contains ancestral burials, is sacred to their people, and is "essential to the survival of our traditions."

In an opinion piece for a local newspaper, protest organizer Max Wilbert has cited research linking large infrastructure projects such as mines with violence against Indigenous women, and pointed to recent cases of sexual violence at the Enbridge Line 3 pipeline where contractors were arrested in a sex trafficking sting.

In October, 2022 the Western Mining Action Network organized an international conference in Reno, NV in which international frontline communities affected by mining called for a just transition to renewable energy that would not threaten Indigenous cultures and the environment and voiced concerns about the development of Thacker Pass lithium mine.

In an opinion piece in a local newspaper, Lithium Americas CEO Alexi Zawadzki criticized the protests and reassured concerns about environmental impact. He argued that development of the Thacker Pass lithium deposit would support President Biden's economic security goals, provide jobs, and help the U.S. reach greenhouse gas emission targets. According to reporting in local news, Zawadzki and the company remained in active communication with the Fort McDermitt Paiute and Shoshone tribe, and several dozen tribal members had applied for jobs at the mine.

In an opinion piece in a local newspaper, Glenn C. Miller, professor emeritus of the Department of Natural Resources and Environmental Science, University of Nevada Reno wrote "The proposed Thacker Pass mine will be relatively benign in comparison to other large mines in Nevada, primarily gold and copper mines." Miller also stated that no mining below the groundwater level will occur for the first 20 years, though later mining may go below that level. Miller states that there should be an on-going discussion about how the project would change the character of the valley. Miller closes with "The Thacker Pass mine is an important mitigation measure to slowing the U.S. contribution to climate change."

Max Wilbert, an environmental organizer and protester stated: "A lot of us understand blowing up a mountain for coal mining is wrong; I think blowing up a mountain for lithium mining is just as wrong," and "Electric cars won't actually reduce greenhouse gas emissions that much; they will reduce emissions but not by a sizable amount." However the reporters noted that nearly 30% of US greenhouse gas emissions come from the transportation sector.

Glenn Miller, a retired environmental professor from the University of Nevada Reno stated that it is a "relatively benign mine for its size." and "Those who say it isn't going to make any difference, they're simply wrong," Miller said. "Radical environmentalists are going to argue that the only way to solve the climate change problem is to drive a whole lot less and to not burn gasoline or coal. Well, that's not going to happen -- the demands of society are set so we're going to have to have an active transportation industry."

The CEO of Lithium Americas said that the most important reason to build mines in the US isn't for the direct mining jobs, but rather to create the domestic supply chain security that thereby enables large numbers of US jobs in battery factories.

ProPublica reported that activists were surveilled by law enforcement including an FBI joint terrorism task force.

== See also ==
- Lithium Valley – Mining area at the Salton Sea, California
- List of countries by lithium production
- List of electric-vehicle-battery manufacturers
- Inflation Reduction Act of 2022
- List of elements facing shortage
- Protectionism in the United States
