= Whitehorse Ranch =

- Cattle Ranch
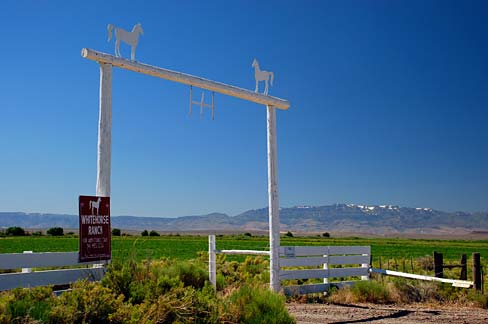
- Whitehorse Ranch front gate

- Location within Oregon Location within the United States
- Coordinates: 42°20′15″N 118°14′23″W
- Country: United States
- State: Oregon
- County: Harney and Malheur counties
- Established: 1869
- Founder: John S. Devine

Area
  - Property: 63,222 acres (25,585 ha)
- The ranch also has BLM grazing allotments covering an additional 287,205 acres (116,228 ha)
- Elevation: 4,380 ft (1,340 m)
- Time zone: UTC-8 (Pacific (PST))
- Owner: BTAZ Nevada

The Whitehorse Ranch is a historic cattle ranch in Harney and Malheur counties in the southeastern corner of Oregon, United States. The ranch was started in 1869 by John S. Devine, a well-known 19th-century cattle baron. It was originally the headquarters for the Todhunter and Devine Cattle Company. The ranch has been in the cattle business continuously since it was founded. Today, the Whitehorse Ranch includes 63,222 acres (255.85 km^{2}) of deeded property and grazing rights on an additional 287,205 acres (1,162.28 km^{2}) of public range land administered by the Bureau of Land Management.

== History ==
Native Americans used the area around Whitehorse Creek for thousands of years before the arrival of European settlers. The birds, animals, and plants found in the wetland around the high desert lake provided abundant food for early inhabitants. While there are no records of the earliest people to inhabit the area, by the time Europeans began to explore the area in the early 19th century, the Northern Paiute people were using the area that is now Whitehorse Ranch.

Hudson's Bay Company fur trappers were the first Europeans to visit southeastern Oregon. Peter Skene Ogden passed along the north shore of the Malheur Lakes in 1826. Other fur trapping expeditions followed in the 1830s. Several military expeditions passed through the area in the late 1850s and 1860s. Major Enoch Steen was the first non-native to explore the land that is now southern Harney County. Steens Mountain was named in his honor. In the 1860s, the United States Army established several military outposts east of Steens Mountain including Camp Alvord and Camp C.F. Smith.

John S. Devine was born in Virginia in 1849. He later immigrated to California. In 1868, Devine decided to establish a cattle ranch in southeastern Oregon. To manage the business, he joined W. B. Todhunter to found the Todhunter and Devine Cattle Company. The following summer, Devine and Juan Redon as head Buckaroo with a dozen California vaqueros along with a chuck wagon and a Chinese cook trailed a herd of 2,500 cattle from California to southeastern Oregon while Todhunter stayed behind to look after the company's holding in the San Joaquin Valley. Devine selected a site on Whitehorse Creek southeast of Steens Mountain for his ranch headquarters. The location was near Camp C. F. Smith, which had been established by the United States Army in 1866 (the camp was abandoned in 1869). According to Oregon Geographic Names, a post office was established at this location in 1867 with W. A. Mix as the first postmaster. Mix was among a group of soldiers moving through the area in an effort to relocate Camp Alvord. The post office was called White Horse. The land then was part of Baker County from which Harney County was carved in 1889.

When Devine took up residence at the ranch, he became the first permanent settler in what is now Harney County, Oregon. Devine became a powerful cattle baron, known for his aristocratic manner. He often dressed in the flamboyant Spanish grandee style including silver-studded leather riding gear. He usually rode a white horse as a symbol of the Whitehorse Ranch. Devine enjoyed horse and greyhound racing, breeding some of his race horses at the ranch. He also supplied horses to the Chico–Silver City stage line. Devine built a large stone and timber barn for his horses. The barn was capped by cupola with a white horse weather vane.

Todhunter and Devine cattle grazed widely across the Alvord Basin and into upper Owyhee country until the harsh winter of 1887 killed most of the herd. In 1889, the Whitehorse Ranch was sold to Henry Miller and Charles Lux. At the time, Miller and Lux was the largest cattle operation in the United States.

The Whitehorse Ranch was purchased by Paul Stewart in 1945. He drilled new wells on the property to supplement unreliable surface irrigation. He also expanded wild hay fields and planted alfalfa and corn on ranch property. Los Angeles coin dealer, Roy E. "Ted" Naftzger acquired the ranch in 1961. Naftzger purchased addition land and built the private Whitehorse Ranch Airport at the ranch.

In 1988, the Whitehorse Ranch joined the Bureau of Land Management, United States Fish and Wildlife Service, Oregon Department of Fish and Wildlife, Oregon Environmental Council, Oregon Cattlemen's Association, Oregon Trout, and the Izaak Walton League to found the Trout Creek Mountain Working Group. The group's goal was to review, discuss and resolve land use conflicts in the Trout Creek Mountains area of southeast Oregon. In 1989, the Whitehorse Ranch voluntarily removed its livestock from 50,000 acres (200 km^{2}) of its Whitehorse Butte grazing allotment and two other mountain pastures for a period of three years to prevent over grazing and allow watershed and riparian areas to recover from past grazing. The Trout Creek Mountain Working Group finally agreed on a long-term environmental sustainment plan in 1992. As part of that agreement, the Whitehorse Ranch agreed to reduce the number of its cattle that grazed on public lands from 3,500 to 800.

In 2006, Naftzger sold the ranch to David Herman, a Portland farm equipment dealer and attorney. During the period he owned the ranch, Herman welcomed paying guests who stayed in the ranch's bunkhouse and guest cottages. In 2012, Herman sold the ranch to the BTAZ Nevada cattle company for $10.8 million. Shortly after BTAZ Nevada bought the ranch, the 556,330-acre (2,251.4 km^{2}) Long Draw Fire burned some of the ranch's grazing allotment in the Trout Creek Mountains.

== Ranch operation ==
The Whitehorse Ranch has been continuously operated as a cattle ranch since 1869. Today, it includes 63,222 acres (255.85 km^{2}) of deeded property. The ranch also has Bureau of Land Management grazing allotments that allow its livestock to graze on 287,205 acres (1,162.28 km^{2}) of public range land. When the deeded property and the grazing allotments are combined the ranch stretches 35 miles (56 km) north to south and 27 miles (43 km) east to west.

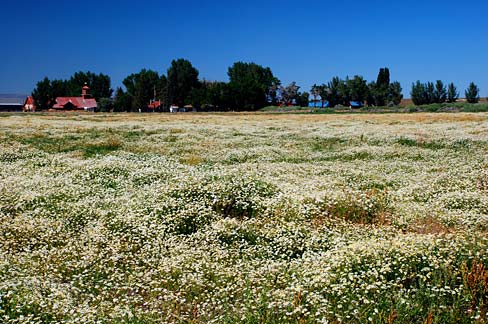
Whitehorse Ranch meadow with historic barn beyond

The ranch has 135 miles (217 km) of gravel and dirt roads, 135 miles (217 km) of fence, and 12 livestock wells. There are seven irrigation wells with 250 miles (400 km) of irrigation canals and ditches to deliver water to the fields. In addition, the ranch has primary and secondary water rights in several watersheds. The ranch also has one domestic well that provides potable water for ranch houses and other facilities. The ranch has a private air field with two runways. The main runway is 3,247 feet (990 m) long and 94 feet (29 m) wide.

Prior to the Trout Creek Mountain Working Group agreement in 1992, the Whitehorse Ranch kept approximately 3,500 head of cattle on its range lands. Today, the number of cattle has been reduced to 800. The ranch also keeps approximately 50 horses for use on the ranch. The ranch has a small permanent crew; however, additional people are often hired to help with herding, branding, and hay harvesting. The ranch is so large that moving livestock from one pasture to another often takes several days. During these movements, ranch hands herd cattle from dawn to sundown through rugged Oregon High Desert.

The ranch's remote location creates some unique challenges. For example, the ranch uses approximately 10,000 US gallons (38,000 L) of fuel per year. Since there are no local fuel stations, the ranch buys fuel from a wholesale distributor in Eugene and trucks it to the ranch once a year. To conserve fuel, ranch hands use small vehicles to check fences and irrigation ditches. The remoteness of the ranch also requires ranch hands to do most equipment repairs on site.

The Whitehorse Ranch is an official weather station. It reports weather data to NOAA's National Climatic Data Center daily.

Climate data for Whitehorse Ranch, Oregon
Month	Jan	Feb	Mar	Apr	May	Jun	Jul	Aug	Sep	Oct	Nov	Dec	Year
Mean daily maximum °F (°C)	41.4 (5.2)	46.8 (8.2)	54.2 (12.3)	61.0 (16.1)	68.8 (20.4)	77.4 (25.2)	87.6 (30.9)	86.5 (30.3)	77.8 (25.4)	65.7 (18.7)	51.0 (10.6)	40.8 (4.9)	63.3 (17.3)
Daily mean °F (°C)	31.2 (−0.4)	35.2 (1.8)	41.4 (5.2)	47.1 (8.4)	54.4 (12.4)	61.7 (16.5)	71.0 (21.7)	69.5 (20.8)	60.8 (16.0)	50.5 (10.3)	38.7 (3.7)	30.2 (−1.0)	49.3 (9.6)
Mean daily minimum °F (°C)	20.9 (−6.2)	23.5 (−4.7)	28.6 (−1.9)	33.2 (0.7)	40.0 (4.4)	46.0 (7.8)	54.3 (12.4)	52.5 (11.4)	43.8 (6.6)	35.3 (1.8)	26.5 (−3.1)	19.7 (−6.8)	35.4 (1.9)
Average precipitation inches (mm)	.63 (16)	.70 (18)	.87 (22)	.92 (23)	.93 (24)	.55 (14)	.21 (5.3)	.68 (17)	.54 (14)	.57 (14)	.67 (17)	.71 (18)	7.98 (202.3)
Source: National Oceanic and Atmospheric Administration, National Climatic Data Center normals data, 1981–2010

== Ranch environment ==
The native vegetation on the Whitehorse Ranch is dominated by large sagebrush and desert grasses. Other common shrubs include bitterbrush, snowberry, and ceanothus. Patches of mountain mahogany are also found in the area. Common grass species include Idaho fescue, bluebunch wheatgrass, cheatgrass, western needlegrass, Sandberg's bluegrass, Thurber's needlegrass, and bottlebrush squirreltail plus basin wildrye in some well-drained areas.

The ranch supports a wide variety of wildlife including cougar, mule deer, pronghorn antelope, coyote, and jackrabbits. Bird species native to the area include sage grouse, mountain chickadees, gray-headed juncos, black-throated gray warbler, Virginia's warbler, MacGillivray's warbler, pine siskin, red crossbill, bushtit, hermit thrush, and northern goshawks, ravens, and eagles. Creeks on the Whitehorse Ranch are home to Lahontan cutthroat trout. To preserve the riparian ecosystem, the ranch keeps cattle away from creek banks during critical times of the year.

== Location ==
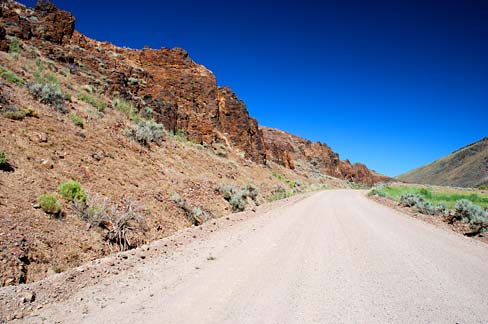
Whitehorse Ranch Road east of Fields, Oregon

The Whitehorse Ranch is in extremely remote area of southeastern Oregon. It is southeast of Steens Mountain and the Alvord Desert and north of the Trout Creek Mountains. The ranch headquarters is along Whitehorse Creek in the southeast corner of Harney County. However, the ranch also includes property in Malheur County. The base elevation of the ranch is 4,380 feet (1,340 m) above sea level. The elevation at the ranch's air field is 4,447 feet (1,355 m).

The nearest neighbors are ranches 12 miles (19 km) east and west of the Whitehorse Ranch property. The nearest town is the very small unincorporated community of Fields, Oregon, 23 miles (37 km) west of the ranch headquarters. The equally small community of Denio, Nevada, is 42 miles (68 km) southwest of the ranch. Burns, Oregon, the county seat of Harney County, is 130 miles (210 km) to the north and west of the ranch. Caldwell, Idaho is 165 miles (266 km) away.

The ranch is located on Whitehorse Ranch Road, a gravel road that extends 50 miles (80 km) from Oregon Route 205 8 miles (13 km) south of Fields to U.S. Route 95 between Jordan Valley, Oregon, and McDermitt, Nevada.
