= Bog Hot Springs =

Thermal spring in Nevada

- Bog Hot
- Location within Nevada
- Interactive map of Bog Hot Springs
- Location: Bog Hot Valley, Nevada
- Coordinates: 41.925°N 118.80170°W
- Elevation: 3,999 feet (1,219 m)
- Type: geothermal
- Discharge: 3800 L/min
- Temperature: 131 °F (55 °C)

Bog Hot Springs is a thermal spring located in the Bog Hot Valley, in Humboldt County, Nevada. It is known to the locals as Bog Hot.

== Description ==
The hot springs have been used to water stock animals and also to irrigate hay. Currently, the springs are used as a domestic water source, and as recreational hot mineral water baths that are located on the Bog Hot Springs Ranch.

The hot springs are located on a fault line between Oregon and the Soldier Meadows hot spring system.

== Location ==
The springs are located in Nevada a few miles south of the Oregon border on the north side of Continental Lake, next to the Pueblo Mountains. The Baltazor Hot Springs can be found nearby.

The hot springs are located on private land, the Bog Hot Springs Cattle Ranch, however they are free and available for the public to use.

== Water profile ==
The hot mineral water emerges from the ground at a rate of 3800 L/min at a temperature of 131 °F (55 °C), and cool to a temperature of 108 °F (42 °C) in the reservoir. After emerging from the source, the water flows for a mile through the desert to a collection reservoir.

The flow of the geothermally heated water can be found along the Western branch of the fault lineament as it runs from Soldier Meadows hot springs to McGee Mountain and Gridley Lake. The flow is controlled by the junction of an older fault system as well as the Basin and Range fault.
