= Lithium Americas =

Canadian mining company

Lithium Americas Corp.
- Type: Public
- Traded as: NYSE: LAC; TSX: LAC
- Industry: Mining
- Founded: October 3, 2023; 3 years ago
- Headquarters: Vancouver, British Columbia, Canada
- Key people: Kelvin Dushnisky (Chairman); Jonathan Evans (President and CEO); Pablo Mercado (CFO)
- Revenue: -$42.60 million (loss) (2024) -$3.90 million (loss) (2023) -$67.79 million (loss) (2022)
- Total assets: ▲$1,044.9 million (2024)
- Website: www.lithiumamericas.com
- Footnotes; Financials as of March 28, 2025.

Lithium Americas Corp. is a Canadian mining corporation. It is currently developing the Thacker Pass Lithium Mine in northern Nevada.

== History ==
The first incarnation of Lithium Americas Corp. was founded in the summer of 2009, and was a spin-off of Argentinian lithium operations in Caucharí-Olaroz owned by Latin American Minerals Inc and Grupo Minero Los Boros, an Argentinean borax producer.

In September 2015, Lithium Americas merged into another Canadian junior mining company, the Western Lithium USA Corporation. The Western Lithium USA Corporation was founded in 2008 as a spinoff of Western Uranium's lithium project in the King Valley (now known as Thacker Pass). Post-merger, on March 22, 2016, Western Lithium announced it would rename itself to the Lithium Americas Corp.

The current incarnation of Lithium Americas Corp. was created on October 3, 2023 after the close of trading from the separation between the previous Lithium Americas and its South American operations, now also a separate entity, Lithium Americas (Argentina) Corp.

The primary project of Lithium Americas is the development of a lithium mining operation near Thacker Pass in northern Nevada. On January 15, 2021, the American Bureau of Land Management issued a Record of Decision approving the Thacker Pass Lithium Mine. On January 31, 2023, General Motors announced a $650 million investment into Lithium Americas, with GM gaining full access to the first phase of lithium production. Initial construction on the project began in March 2023, with production of the mine beginning in 2026, and full production expected in 2027. On March 14, 2024, the Biden administration announced a $2.26 billion loan for the construction of the Thacker Pass mine.

In October 2024 Lithium Americas announced a substantial investment increase from General Motors, bringing GM's total commitment to the Canadian mining company to $945 million—up from $650 million. The agreement forms a joint venture between GM and Lithium Americas to develop the Thacker Pass mine in Nevada, the largest known lithium deposit in the U.S. This investment is expected to support increased lithium production.

In October 2025, the US Department of Energy took a 5% stake in Lithium Americas and a separate 5% stake in the Thacker Pass mine—restructuring a $2.26 billion US government loan agreement from 2024. The deal is meant to help finance the construction of manufacturing facilities eventually expected to produce 40,000 tons of lithium carbonate per year.

In August 2026, Lithium Americas signed a deal with YA II PN, an affiliate of Yorkville Advisors Global to secure financing of $175 million for the Thacker Pass Lithium Project via subordinated convertible debentures
