= McDermitt Caldera =

Caldera in Nevada and Oregon, United States

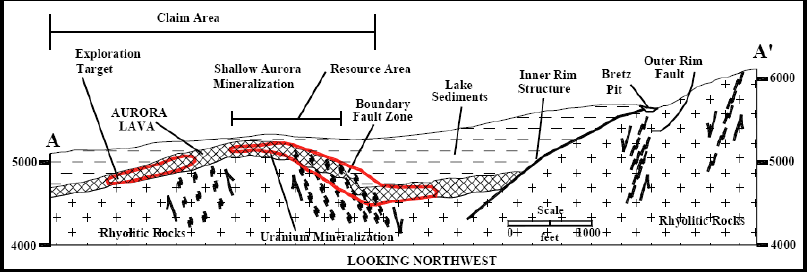
- Geologic cross-section of McDermitt Caldera

Highest point
- Peak: Jordan Meadow Mountain
- Elevation: 6,816 ft (2,078 m)
- Coordinates: 41°51′01″N 118°02′12″W

Dimensions
- Length: 28 mi (45 km) north–south
- Width: 22 mi (35 km) east–west

Geography
- Location within Oregon Location within Nevada
- Location: Harney County, Oregon; Malheur County, Oregon; Humboldt County, Nevada
- Range coordinates: 42°00′05″N 117°59′48″W

Geology
- Rock age: 19 million years (Miocene)
- Mountain type: Caldera
- Last eruption: 16.39 ± 0.02 million years ago (Miocene)

McDermitt Caldera is a Miocene caldera west of McDermitt in southeastern Oregon and northern Nevada in the United States. The oval-shaped caldera is about 28 miles (45 km) wide north–south and 22 miles (35 km) wide east–west. It was formed by the Yellowstone hotspot about 16.4 million years ago.

The highest point at McDermitt Caldera is 6,816 feet (2,078 m) above sea level at Jordan Meadow Mountain, which is part of the Montana Mountains of Nevada.

Before American settlement, the area was occupied by the seminomadic Shoshone and Northern Paiute people. Beginning in the mid-19th century, ranching became the primary human activity. The caldera contains significant ore deposits, some of which have been exploited. Mercury and uranium were mined in the 20th century, and exploration with an eye toward future lithium extraction began around 2017.

The caldera is also an important ecological region for endangered species such as sage grouse and the Lahontan cutthroat trout. Sage grouse populations here are particularly healthy despite declines elsewhere in the western United States.

== Geography ==
The caldera lies in a remote region along the Oregon–Nevada state line west of McDermitt and north of Winnemucca, Nevada. It is loosely shaped like a raindrop oriented north–south, with the wider end on the north.

The caldera forms an endorheic basin within the larger Great Basin region in the western United States where water does not flow to the ocean. The western part of the caldera is in the Trout Creek Mountains, and the northern part is in the Oregon Canyon Mountains. The Montana Mountains, which contain the caldera's highest point, lie near the center of the caldera.

McDermitt Caldera is in an arid high-altitude landscape. The Cascade Range to the west creates a rain shadow that includes this region. Standing water is rare, with annual rainfall under 10 in (250 mm). Temperatures are extreme, with winter lows approaching −10 °F (−23 °C) and summer highs approaching 105 °F (41 °C).

== Geology ==
McDermitt Caldera is possibly the oldest caldera in the Yellowstone hotspot track, a path of volcanic features that are progressively younger to the northeast, extending across southern Idaho to Yellowstone Caldera. As the North American plate moved southwest relative to the underlying hotspot, volcanism migrated northeast from the McDermitt area. The western part of the hotspot track is within the larger Basin and Range Province, where ongoing tectonic extension since about 17 million years ago has created the alternating mountain ranges and sedimentary basins typical of northern Nevada and southeastern Oregon.

McDermitt Caldera formed from the collapse of a lava dome between 16.37 and 16.41 million years ago. The lava dome had been built by eruptions producing rhyolite beginning about 19 million years ago. A lake subsequently formed in the caldera, depositing varved sediments, diatomite, opal, and organic matter amidst lava flows and tuffs. During later volcanic activity, uplift of the caldera drained the lake, and hydrothermal fluids moved upward through the lakebed sediments, carrying additional ore-bearing minerals. The youngest volcanic activity at the caldera is 14.9 million years old.

Other volcanic features in Oregon that are related to the Yellowstone hotspot include Smith Rock, which is part of the Crooked River caldera (older than McDermitt Caldera), and the Columbia River Basalt Group, most of which is about the same age as McDermitt Caldera.

== History ==
The Shoshone and Northern Paiute people inhabited the lands in and around McDermitt Caldera before the United States expanded in the region. Before the mid-19th Century they lived a seminomadic lifestyle following migratory animals and seasonal foods. These people fought American settlers in a series of battles during the 19th Century but were eventually removed to reservations throughout the West.

Fort McDermit was established by the U.S. Army east of the caldera in 1866 as part of this campaign. It was named for Lt. Col. Charles McDermitt, who was killed in a skirmish with Native Americans nearby in 1865. The nearby community was named McDermitt after the fort, which also lends its name to the caldera.

U.S. soldiers killed dozens of indigenous people at Thacker Pass in the late-1800s. The area has since become an important spiritual site for these tribes and ceremonies are held here to memorialize those killed. The native people continue to hunt and forage for traditional food sources in the region. The historical significance of the site, as well as the ecological resources, have led Native tribes to oppose lithium mine development in the 21st Century.

Ranching by American settlers began during the conflict with resident natives and continues to this day. A stage road from Virginia City, Nevada to Silver City, Idaho passed near the caldera.

Mercury and uranium were mined during the 20th Century with the latter being discovered in 1953. Lithium was discovered in the 1970s and the last mercury mine closed in 1992. Abandoned mines and associated waste piles remain.

Exploration for lithium extraction was approved by the federal government in 2017 with significant opposition from environmental, native, and agricultural groups.

== Economic resources ==
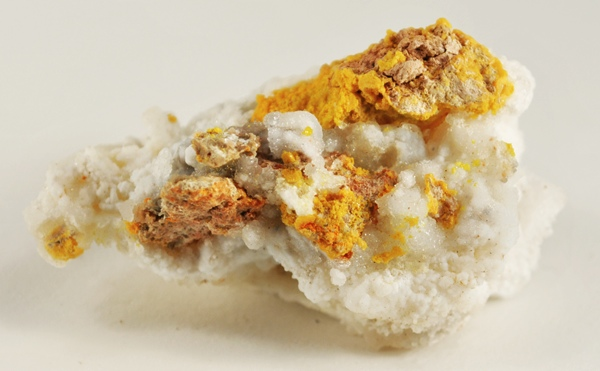
Kleinite, a rare yellow mineral containing mercury (formula: (Hg_{2}N)(Cl,SO_{4})·nH_{2}O) from the McDermitt Mine

Significant ore deposits are buried in the caldera, including mercury and uranium, which were mined at more than eight sites in the caldera during the 20th century. Mercury at these mines was extracted in large amounts, predominantly from cinnabar. The McDermitt Mine, located on the eastern edge of the caldera in Nevada, was the last active mercury mine in the United States before it shut down.

Uranium was extracted mainly from a rhyolite brecciated fault zone at the Moonlight mine on the caldera's southwestern edge. The uranium ore minerals include uraninite and coffinite. The age of the uranium formation is assumed to be the same as the caldera tuff, which is approximately 16.1 million years. Other deposits in the caldera contain ores of antimony, cesium, and lithium (potentially, one of the biggest lithium mines in the world).

The Thacker Pass lithium deposit, located within the caldera, is a prospect that in 2017 was said to be the most significant lithium-clay resource in the U.S. Additional lithium exploration was approved in the northern end of the caldera in 2025.

Samples show that while lithium can be found in sedimentary deposits throughout the caldera, the highest concentrations are in the southern end near Thacker Pass. It is estimated that there is between 20 and 40 million metric tons of lithium-rich clay present.

Most of the land is owned by the Bureau of Land Management. Outside of mining, several ranchers lease land in and around McDermitt Caldera for their cattle. There has been significant pushback against proposed lithium mines because of how they could negatively impact ranching in the region.

== Ecology ==
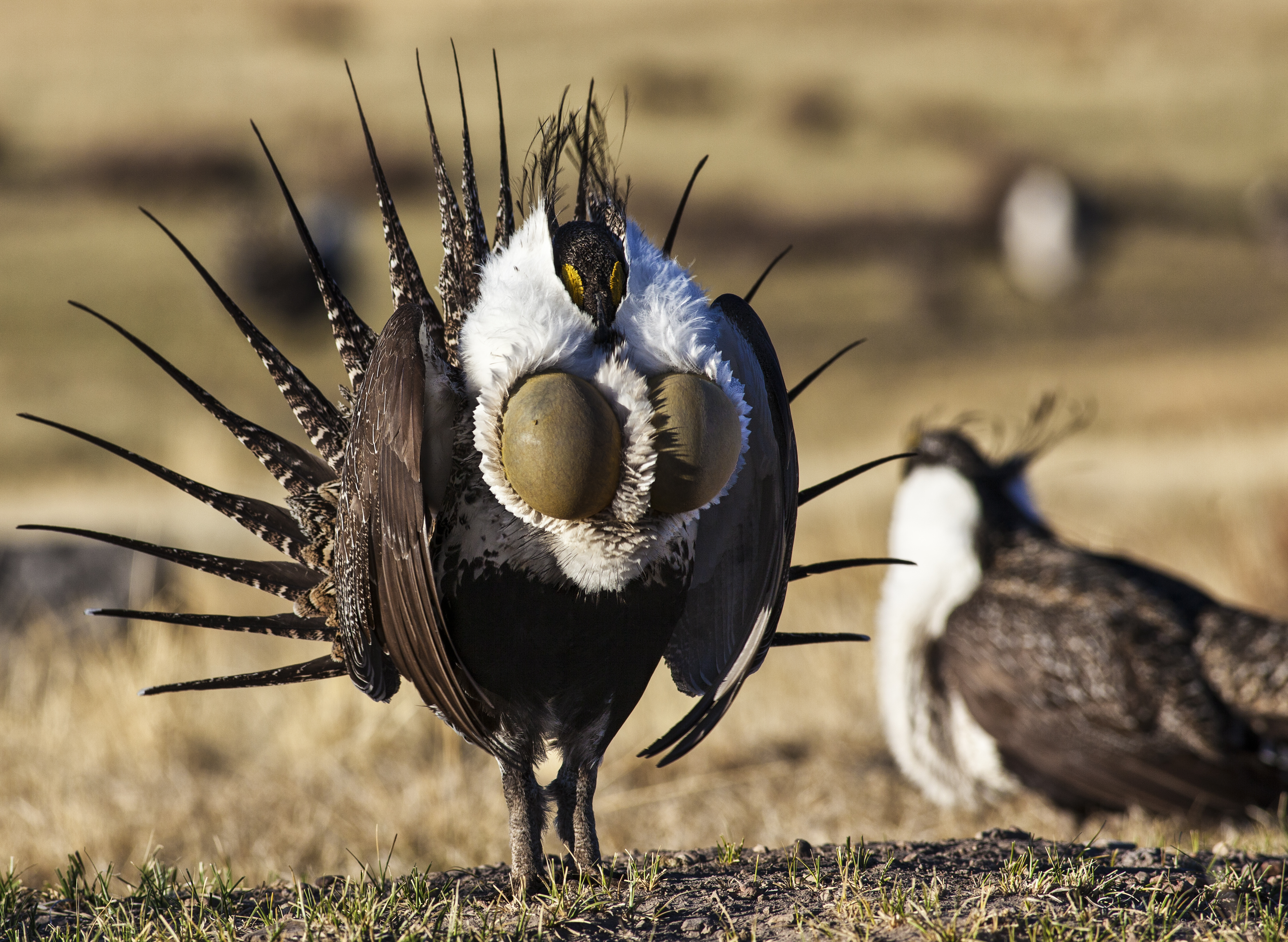
Greater sage grouse with its gular sacs inflated to attract mates during a courtship display.

The McDermitt Caldera is a shrub–steppe environment with the primary vegetation being grasses and sagebrush. It is an important habitat for endangered species such as sage grouse and the Lahontan cutthroat trout. Sage grouse have dozens of mating sites in the area and it has been a stronghold for the species that has lost 80% of its population since the 1960s.

In the late-1980s and 1990s legislation was passed forcing changes in ranching to protect these species, especially in riparian zones. Ecological considerations have led the conversation against developing new mining operations. Until 2017, new mining claims were not considered by the government but regulatory changes during the first presidency of Donald Trump loosened these regulations.

A diverse coalition of environmental groups, Native American tribes in the region, and ranchers have pushed back against development. Nearby Native Americans continue to hunt and forage for traditional food sources today and development of these mines would damage these ecosystems.

Ranchers noted that beyond the environmental concerns and impact to their operations, there was mistrust in the government moving forward because the changes made to protect endangered species in the late-1900s were being ignored in favor of large corporations.
