= Grampian Hills =

Mountain range in Oregon, United States

- Location within Oregon

Highest point
- Elevation: 1,840 m (6,040 ft)

Geography
- Country: United States
- State: Oregon
- District: Klamath County
- Range coordinates: 42°16′44.503″N 122°5′4.056″W
- Topo map: USGS Aspen Lake

The Grampian Hills are a mountain range in Klamath County, Oregon.
