= Canby Creek =

Stream in Yellow Medicine County, Minnesota, U.S.

Coordinates: 44°46′27″N 96°14′16″W

Canby Creek is a stream in Yellow Medicine County, in the U.S. state of Minnesota.

Canby Creek took its name from the city of Canby, Minnesota.

== See also ==
- List of rivers of Minnesota
- List of rivers of the United States
