= Hot Spring Hills =

Mountain range in Oregon, United States

- Location within Oregon

Highest point
- Elevation: 1,446 m (4,744 ft)

Geography
- Country: United States
- State: Oregon
- District: Malheur County
- Range coordinates: 42°4′49.595″N 117°45′6.509″W
- Topo map: USGS Boghole Spring

The Hot Spring Hills are a mountain range in Malheur County, Oregon.
