= Crooked Creek Range =

American mountain range

- Location within Oregon

Highest point
- Elevation: 1,282 m (4,206 ft)

Geography
- Country: United States
- State: Oregon
- District: Malheur County
- Range coordinates: 42°33′59.584″N 118°2′37.569″W
- Topo map: USGS Coyote Lake East

The Crooked Creek Range is a mountain range in Malheur County, Oregon, United States.
