= Sand Hills (Oregon) =

Mountain range in Harney County, Oregon

- Location within Oregon

Highest point
- Elevation: 1,275 m (4,183 ft)

Geography
- Country: United States
- State: Oregon
- District: Harney County
- Range coordinates: 42°1′29.625″N 118°35′13.623″W
- Topo map: USGS Colony Ranch

The Sand Hills are a mountain range in Harney County, Oregon.
