= Double H High Adventure Base =

- Owner: Rocky Mountain Elk Foundation
- Location: Datil, New Mexico
- Country: United States
- Coordinates: 34°06′59.9″N 107°40′37.23″W
- Founded: 2004
- Defunct: 2009
- Website www.scouting.org/highadventure/philmont/doublehranch.aspx

Double H High Adventure Base, operated on the Plains of San Agustin near Datil, New Mexico as a satellite program base of the Boy Scouts of America's (BSA) Philmont Scout Ranch from 2004 to 2009. The Double H High Adventure Base was located at the Torstenson Family Wildlife Center, formerly known as the Double H Ranch. The Double H was made possible through a partnership with the Rocky Mountain Elk Foundation and the Boy Scouts of America.

Double H was designed with the goal of providing crews with a rugged, backpacking experience. Crews arriving at Double H base camp were teamed up with a wilderness guide that spent the entire trek with the crew, providing training and program.

Crews were given opportunities to hike through canyons, navigate cross-country using a map and compass. Scouts also got the opportunity to use a GPS device while Geocaching. Base camp was located at over 7,000 feet. Significant elevation changes occurred as crews hiked through the open Ponderosa forest. In addition to Ponderosa forests, participants had the opportunity to see many varieties of cacti, Pinon trees, Juniper trees and elk.

== Historical Itinerary ==
On the morning of their first day, participating crews would arrive at the Double H and go through base camp where they would receive their crew gear and food. Crews also received an orientation from their wilderness guide and then headed to the backcountry that afternoon.

On their fourth day, crews arrived at the Martin Camp where they were given the opportunity to resupply and participate in a western dinner. Each crew had a chance to shoot inline black powder rifles, try their hand at a 3-D archery course, and participate in Search and Rescue training.

From the second to third day and from the fifth to sixth day, crews explored the Double H. With no established trail system, and no naturally occurring surface water, the Double H was considered by many to be a true rugged, southwestern experience. Along the way, the wilderness guides provided programming for the members of the crew. This program included challenge course, Leave No Trace, astronomy, geocaching, search and rescue and a conservation project.

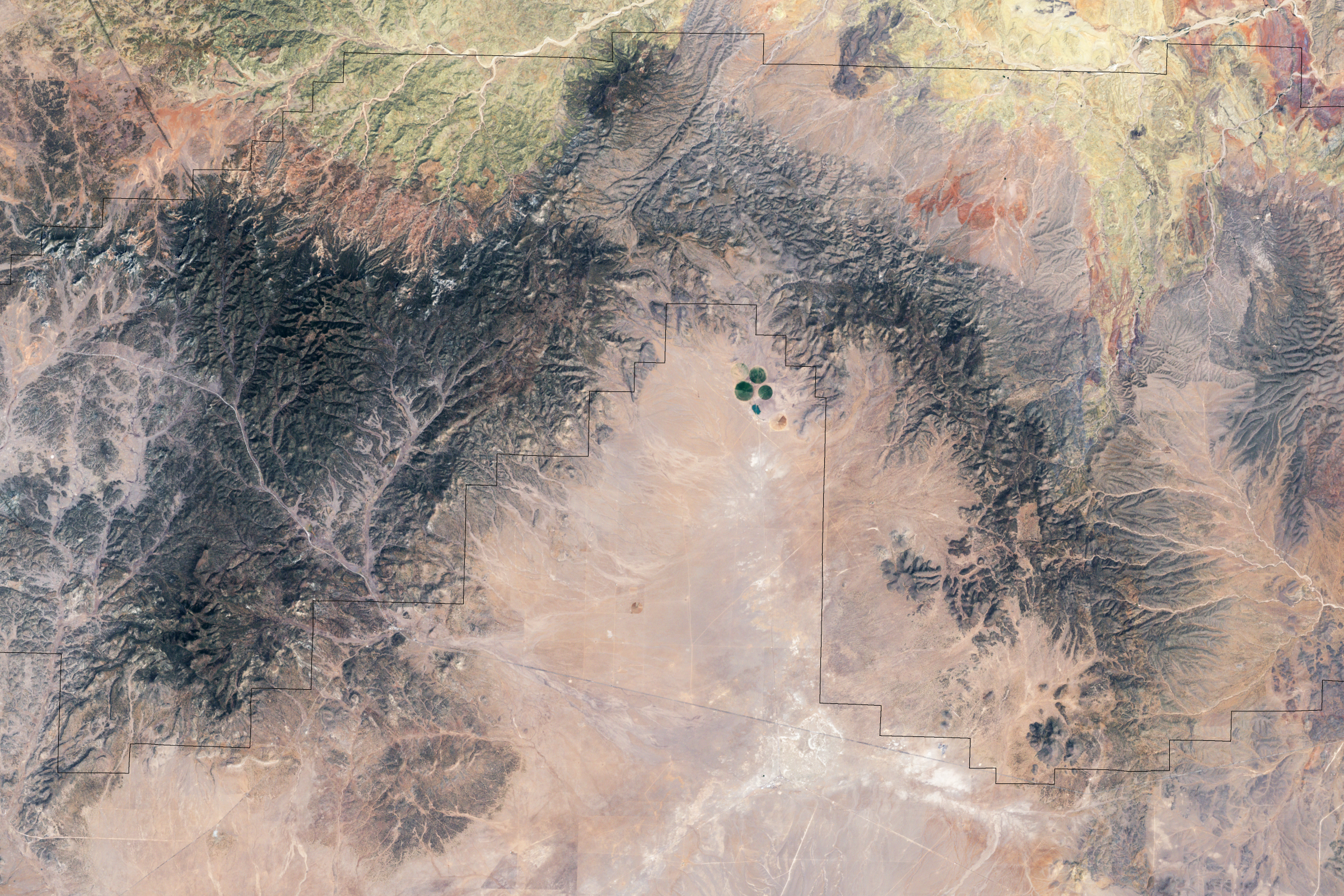
Satellite photo of the Plains of San Agustin

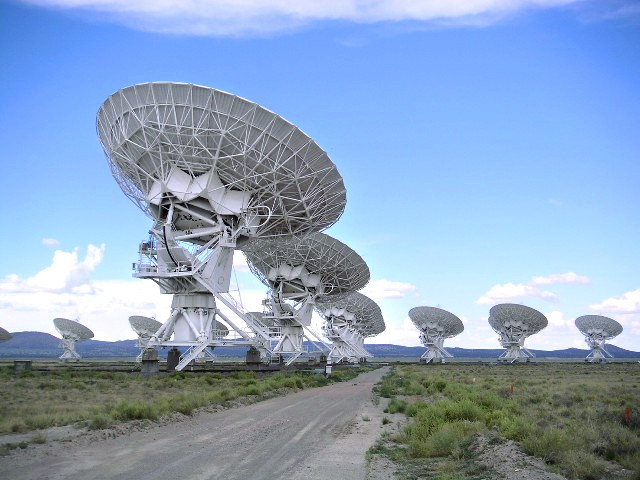
Very Large Array, on the Plains of San Agustin

== 2009 Closure ==
In 2008, the Boy Scouts of America announced that the Double H High Adventure Base would conclude six years of operation with the 2009 season, no reservations would be accepted for the 2010 season. Other plans for the site were cited as the primary reason for the closure.
