= Crowcamp Hills =

Mountain range in Oregon, USA

- Location within Oregon

Highest point
- Elevation: 1,708 m (5,604 ft)

Geography
- Country: United States
- State: Oregon
- District: Harney County
- Range coordinates: 43°31′29.564″N 118°30′8.725″W
- Topo map: USGS Mahon Creek

The Crowcamp Hills are a mountain range in Harney County, Oregon. This mountain range is located at a latitude of 43.5249 and a longitude of 118.5024, locating this mountain range within the Drewsey CCD.
