= Continental Lake =

Lake in Humboldt County, Nevada, United States

- Location within Nevada
- Location: Humboldt County, Nevada
- Coordinates: 41°53′56″N 118°43′32″W
- Type: lake

Continental Lake is a lake in northern Humboldt County, Nevada, United States.

Continental Lake was named by a group of early settlers who had embarked on a trans-continental journey.

== See also ==
- List of lakes in Nevada
