= Canby (surname) =

Canby is a surname. Notable people with the surname include:

- Edward Canby (1817–1873), American general
- Henry Seidel Canby (1878–1961), critic, editor, and Yale University professor
- James Canby (1781–1858), businessman and banker based in Wilmington, Delaware
- Louisa Hawkins Canby (1818–1889), wife of Edward Canby
- Richard S. Canby (1808–1895), U.S. Representative from Ohio
- Sheila R. Canby (1949–2025), American art historian and curator
- Vincent Canby (1924–2000), American film critic
- William C. Canby Jr. (born 1931), U.S. Court of Appeals senior judge
- William Marriott Canby (1831–1904), American financier and botanist
