= Fields, Oregon =

Unincorporated community in the state of Oregon, United States

- Unincorporated community
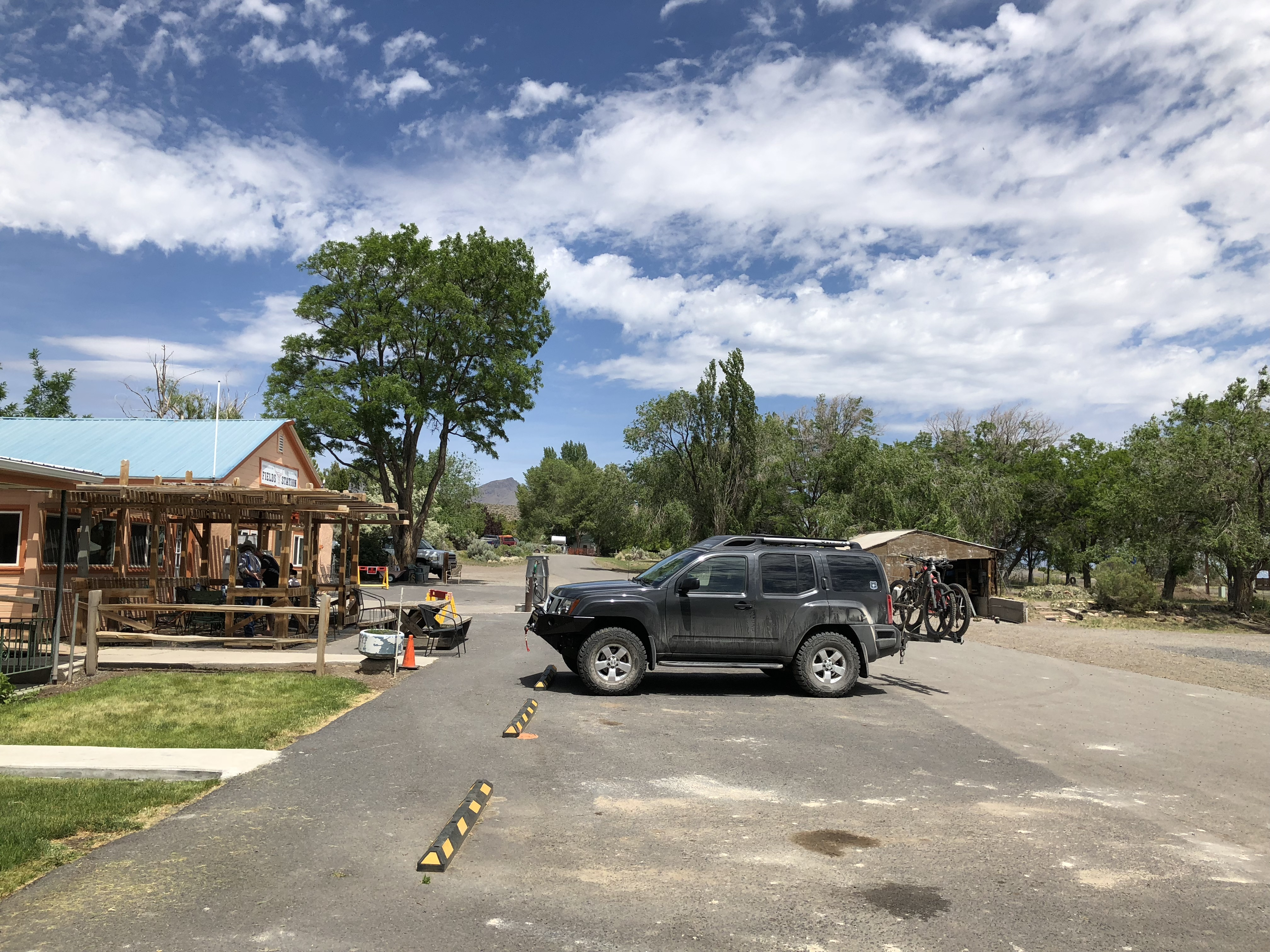
- Fields Station, June 2018

- Location within Oregon Location within the United States
- Coordinates: 42°15′52″N 118°40′31″W
- Country: United States
- State: Oregon
- County: Harney
- Elevation: 4,236 ft (1,291 m)

Population (2010)
  - Total: 120
- Within zip code 97710
- Time zone: Pacific
- Postal code: 97710
- GNIS feature ID: 1120703

Fields is an unincorporated community in Harney County, Oregon, United States. The community is located 112 miles (180 km) south of Burns. It is the center of commerce for local ranches and the largest community between Denio, Nevada, 22 miles (35 km) to the south, and Frenchglen, Oregon, 52.4 miles (84.3 km) to the north.

The community has a single family-owned retail outlet and restaurant called Fields Station. The 1-mile (1.6 km) radius around that store has below 25 occupants.

== History ==
In 1881, Charles Fields established a homestead where the community of Fields is located today. Fields built a stagecoach roadhouse to serve the stage route between Winnemucca, Nevada, and Burns. A one-room school was established at the site around 1900 with one teacher. Fields sold his business to John Smyth in 1911. The Fields post office was opened two years later. The stone roadhouse was eventually remodeled into a store and restaurant, and is still in use. The original stone horse barn has partly collapsed, but remains in use. Today, the community of Fields consists of a bar, store, cafe, gas station, school, campground, and a few houses. As of 2003, the school has two rooms and two teachers serving kindergarten through eighth grade.

Ranching began in the area in 1869 when Whitehorse Ranch was established. The Rose Valley Borax Company processed about 400 short tons (360,000 kg) of crystallized borax annually from 1892 to 1902. Chinese workers collected alkali formed from evaporating spring water containing 80 parts per million (ppm) borate.

== Climate ==
Averaging under 7 inches (180 mm) of precipitation per year, Fields is among the driest places in Oregon. The nearby Alvord Desert may be the driest. Fields, like the Alvord, experiences a continental or "cold" desert climate (Köppen climate classification BWk).

Climate data for Fields, Oregon
Month	Jan	Feb	Mar	Apr	May	Jun	Jul	Aug	Sep	Oct	Nov	Dec	Year
Record high °F	61	70	78	89	97	101	106	101	96	92	76	62	106
Mean daily maximum °F	42.0	45.8	53.5	58.8	69.5	79.3	90.3	88.1	78.5	64.7	49.8	40.9	63.4
Daily mean °F	32.4	35.3	41.9	46.4	55.9	64.3	74.7	72.1	62.8	50.5	38.7	31.5	50.5
Mean daily minimum °F	22.7	24.8	30.3	33.9	42.3	49.3	59.1	56.1	47.1	36.2	27.6	22.1	37.6
Record low °F	−20	−2	1	14	18	28	40	35	28	10	1	−7	−20
Average precipitation inches	0.80	0.57	0.62	0.69	0.86	0.48	0.19	0.17	0.31	0.53	0.59	0.73	6.54
Record high °C	16	21	26	32	36	38	41	38	36	33	24	17	41
Mean daily maximum °C	5.6	7.7	11.9	14.9	20.8	26.3	32.4	31.2	25.8	18.2	9.9	4.9	17.5
Daily mean °C	0.2	1.8	5.5	8.0	13.3	17.9	23.7	22.3	17.1	10.3	3.7	−0.3	10.3
Mean daily minimum °C	−5.2	−4.0	−0.9	1.1	5.7	9.6	15.1	13.4	8.4	2.3	−2.4	−5.5	3.1
Record low °C	−29	−19	−17	−10	−8	−2	4	2	−2	−12	−17	−22	−29
Average precipitation mm	20	14	16	18	22	12	4.8	4.3	7.9	13	15	19	166
Source: Western Regional Climate Center (period of record for averages is 5/1/1973 to 3/31/2013)

== Demographics ==
As of the 2010 census, the area of zip code 97710 had a population of 120, with 69 males and 51 females. Out of the 120 people, 119 identified as white. 19 members of the population (15.8%) were between 50 and 54 years old, the largest percentile. The average age was 44.5, and the average household size was 2.35 people.

== Economy ==
The town services cars traveling on the local highway.

== Recreation ==
Sightseers, hunters, and fishers often stop at Fields. Local wildlife include pronghorn, mule deer, elk, bighorn sheep, pheasants, doves, geese, and ducks. Rainbow trout are found in nearby streams. There are also publicly accessible hot springs in the area, including Alvord Hot Springs, Bog Hot Springs, and White Horse Hot Springs. Many photographers are interested in Steens Mountain, which is located about 60 miles (97 km) to the north.

== Transportation ==
As of 2023 some pilots of general aviation aircraft use the area highway as an airport.

== Healthcare ==
In 1989, Nellie Nix of The Bulletin described the catchment area of Harney District Hospital in Burns as being Harney County. In 2005 Matthew Preusch of The Oregonian, citing the lack of doctors and long distances between the southern part of the county and the hospital, described the southern part of Harney County, which includes Fields, as "the most medically underserved area of all." In 2005, Harney District Hospital provided a traveling doctor in a mobile trailer for southern parts of the county, which included Fields.

== Education ==
For K-8 residents are zoned to Fields Elementary School, of South Harney School District #33. The school is .25 miles (0.40 km) from the center of Fields. The building itself, as of 1987, had one classroom. As of 2008, the school had two teachers, with each taking some of the grades.

High school students are zoned to Crane Union High School, of Harney County Union High School District 1J.

Harney County is not in a community college district but has a "contract out of district" (COD) with Treasure Valley Community College. TVCC operates the Burns Outreach Center in Burns.
