= White Horse Mountains =

Mountain range in Harney County, Oregon, USA

- Location within Oregon

Highest point
- Elevation: 1,407 m (4,616 ft)

Geography
- Country: United States
- State: Oregon
- District: Harney County
- Range coordinates: 42°12′59.623″N 118°30′4.628″W
- Topo map: USGS Tumtum Lake

The White Horse Mountains are a mountain range in Harney County, Oregon. The White Horse Mountains climb to 4,616 feet (1,407 meters) above sea level.
