= Rogue River Range =

Mountain range in Oregon, United States

- Location within Oregon

Highest point
- Elevation: 733 m (2,405 ft)

Geography
- Country: United States
- State: Oregon
- District: Jackson County
- Range coordinates: 42°45′52.452″N 122°40′4.150″W
- Topo map: USGS Sugarpine Creek

The Rogue River Range is a mountain range in Jackson County, Oregon.
