= Connley Hills =

Mountain range in Lake County, Oregon, United States

- Location within Oregon

Highest point
- Elevation: 1,606 m (5,269 ft)

Geography
- Country: United States
- State: Oregon
- District: Lake County
- Range coordinates: 43°15′29.499″N 121°0′33.999″W
- Topo map: USGS Fort Rock

The Connley Hills are a mountain range in Lake County, Oregon.
