= Disaster Peak =

Mountain in Nevada, United States

- Location within Nevada

Highest point
- Elevation: 7,690 ft (2,340 m)
- Coordinates: 41°57′34″N 118°11′40″W

Disaster Peak is a summit in the U.S. state of Nevada. The summit is located in the Trout Creek Mountains.

Disaster Peak was named after an 1864 confrontation between prospectors and the Paiutes, resulting in the deaths of G. W. Dodge, J. W. Burton and two others.
