= Whiskey Hills =

Mountain range in Oregon, United States

- Location within Oregon

Highest point
- Elevation: 1,681 m (5,515 ft)

Geography
- Country: United States
- State: Oregon
- District: Lake County
- Range coordinates: 42°58′49.535″N 120°30′8.911″W
- Topo map: USGS Diablo Peak

The Whiskey Hills are a mountain range in Lake County, Oregon.
