= Soldier Meadows hot spring system =

Hot spring system

- Soldier Meadows Warm Pond; Bathtub Spring; Soldier Meadows Hot Creek; Chukar Gulch
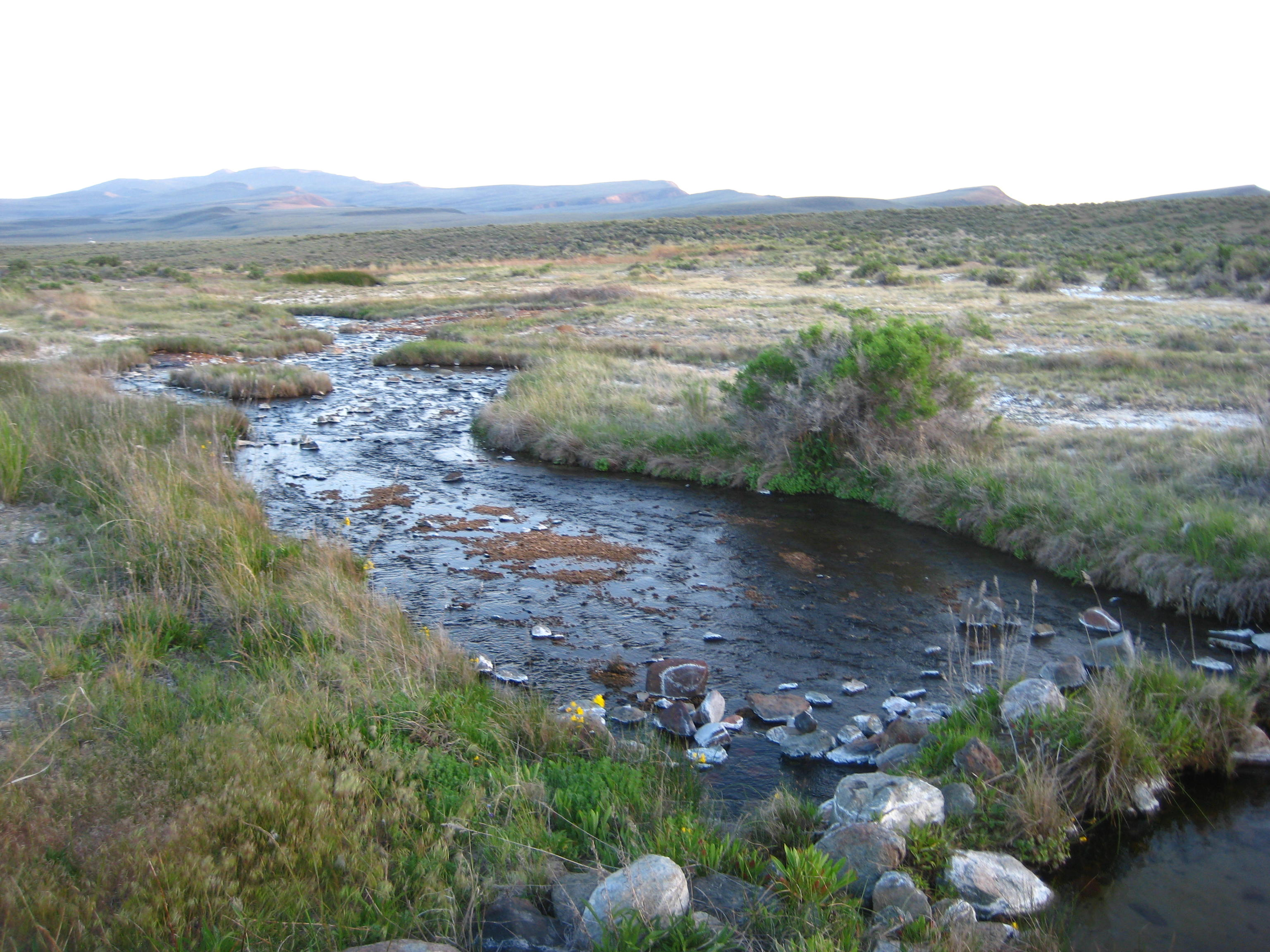
- Interactive map of Soldier Meadows hot spring system
- Location: near Gerlach, Nevada
- Coordinates: 41°22′48″N 119°10′53″W
- Elevation: 4,450 to 4,500 feet
- Type: geothermal

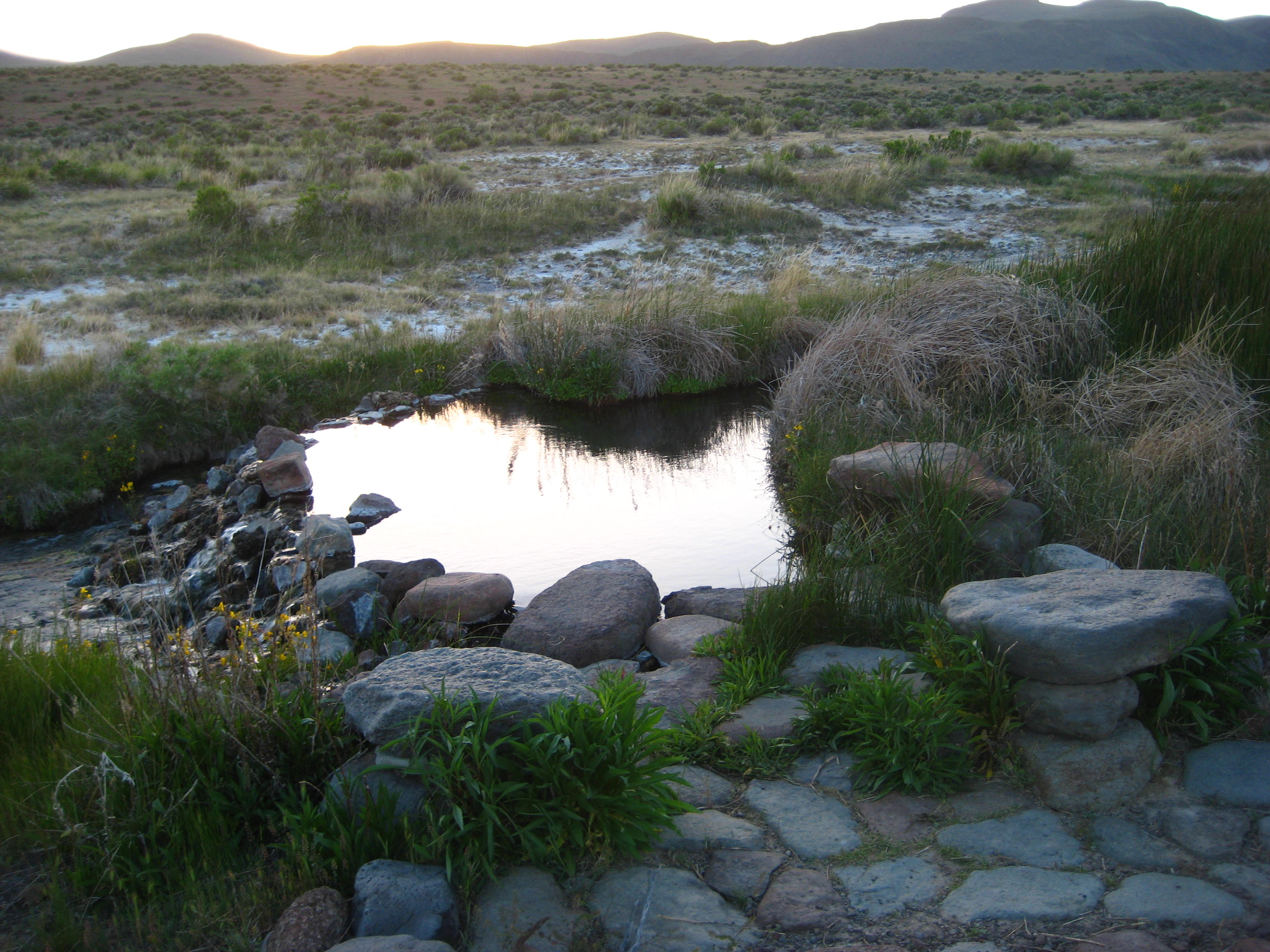
Soldier Meadows Hot Spring

Soldier Meadows hot spring system is a group of hot and warm springs near the town of Gerlach, Nevada.

== History ==
The springs were first used by Indigenous people who occupied the Great Basin area for more than 10,000 years. The band of Northern Paiute people in this area are called Aga'ipanadokado or "fish lake eaters." The Soldier Meadows area gets its name from the time during the American Civil War when troops were stationed nearby.

== Features ==
Soldier Meadows contains several geothermal spring features including Soldier Meadows Warm Pond, Bathtub Spring, Soldier Meadows Hot Creek, and Chukar Gulch, among others.

=== Soldier Meadows Warm Pond ===
Soldier Meadows Warm Pond is a large warm spring located in the middle of the meadow with a large natural, two-foot deep soaking pool. The warm mineral water percolates up through the sand and gravel bottom. The temperature ranges from 90–102 °F (32–39 °C). About 0.5 miles (0.80 km) away is a second small warm pond with a temperature of 100 °F (38 °C). Elevation 4,500 feet (1,400 m). GPS coordinates are N 41 22.793 W 119.10.884.

=== Bathtub Spring ===
Bathtub Spring is located 0.75 miles (1.21 km) from the Soldier Meadows Guest Ranch.

=== Soldier Meadows Hot Creek ===
Several rock dams have been built along Soldier Meadows Hot Creek to form three primitive soaking pools on Bureau of Land Management (BLM) land. The odorless water ranges in temperature from 112–106 °F (44–41 °C). The elevation is 4,500 feet (1,400 m). GPS coordinates N 41 21.531 W 119.13.502.

=== Chukar Gulch ===
Several hot springs discharge into a small trench leading to a 20-foot (6.1 m) diameter three-foot (0.91 m) deep soaking pool with a sandy bottom. The water temperature is 104 °F (40 °C).

== Area of critical environmental concern ==
Because of the high use of the various hot spring features in the area, it has been designated an Area of Critical Environmental Concern (ACEC) by the Bureau of Land Management. Use of sunscreen and other chemicals have compromised the water quality and impacted on the life forms it supports, including the Soldier Meadows Springtail snail, a species that only exist in this habitat. The building of rock soaking pool enclosures also impacts upon the springtail snail population.

== See also ==
- List of hot springs in the United States
- List of hot springs in the world
