= Gage Range =

Mountain range in Wheeler County, Oregon, United States

- Location within Oregon Location within the United States

Highest point
- Elevation: 830 m (2,720 ft)

Geography
- Country: United States
- State: Oregon
- District: Wheeler County
- Range coordinates: 44°34′52.485″N 120°16′23.049″W
- Topo map: USGS Lawson Mountain

The Gage Range is a mountain range in Wheeler County, Oregon.
