= Sage Hen Hills =

Mountain range in Oregon and Nevada, US

- Location within Nevada Location within Oregon

Highest point
- Elevation: 1,851 m (6,073 ft)

Geography
- Country: United States
- States: Oregon and Nevada
- District(s): Harney County, Oregon, Lake County, Oregon and Humboldt County, Nevada
- Range coordinates: 41°57′13.615″N 119°16′1.724″W
- Topo map: USGS Sage Hen Hills

The Sage Hen Hills are a mountain range in Harney and Lake Counties, Oregon, and Humboldt County, Nevada.
