= Hagerhorst Mountains =

Mountain range in Oregon, United States

- Location within Oregon

Highest point
- Elevation: 2,067 m (6,781 ft)

Geography
- Country: United States
- State: Oregon
- District: Klamath County
- Range coordinates: 42°28′29.542″N 120°55′3.937″W
- Topo map: USGS Campbell Reservoir

The Hagerhorst Mountains are a mountain range in Klamath County, Oregon.
