= Coleman Hills =

Mountain range in Oregon, United States

- Location within Oregon

Highest point
- Elevation: 1,555 m (5,102 ft)

Geography
- Country: United States
- State: Oregon
- District: Lake County
- Range coordinates: 42°47′49.554″N 120°4′53.858″W
- Topo map: USGS Coleman Hills

The Coleman Hills are a mountain range in Lake County, Oregon.
