= Virtue Hills =

Mountain range in Oregon, United States

- Location within Oregon

Highest point
- Elevation: 1,430 m (4,690 ft)

Geography
- Country: United States
- State: Oregon
- District: Baker County
- Range coordinates: 44°44′39.557″N 117°42′48.777″W
- Topo map: USGS Encina

The Virtue Hills are a mountain range in Baker County, Oregon.
