= Canby Mountains =

Mountain range in Oregon, United States

- Location within Oregon

Highest point
- Elevation: 1,505 m (4,938 ft)

Geography
- Country: United States
- State: Oregon
- District: Klamath County
- Range coordinates: 42°31′29.494″N 121°49′29.044″W
- Topo map: USGS Chiloquin

The Canby Mountains are a mountain range in Klamath County, Oregon.
