= Bilk Creek Mountains =

Mountain range in Oregon and Nevada, United States

- Location within Nevada

Highest point
- Peak: Unnamed peak
- Elevation: 2,587 m (8,488 ft)

Geography
- Country: United States
- State: Nevada
- District(s): Humboldt County and Harney County, Oregon
- Range coordinates: 41°40′27.633″N 118°19′24.569″W
- Topo map: USGS Ninemile Summit

The Bilk Creek Mountains are a mountain range primarily in Humboldt County, Nevada, United States, but extend north into Harney County, Oregon.

== See also ==
- List of mountain ranges of Nevada
- List of mountain ranges of Oregon
