= Quinn River =

River in Nevada, United States

Quinn River Queen River
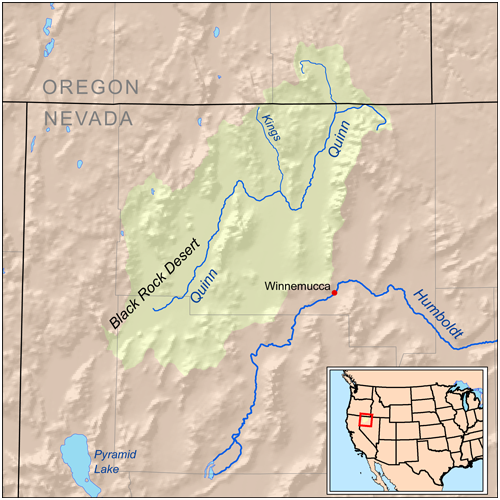
- The Quinn River basin extends into Oregon from Nevada.

Location
- Country: United States
- State: Nevada

Physical characteristics
- Source: W side of the Santa Rosa Range in NE Humboldt County
  - location: near Oregon state line
  - coordinates: 41°58′26″N 117°34′8″W
  - elevation: 3,060 ft (930 m)
- Mouth
  - coordinates: 40°52′59″N 119°03′50″W
- Length: 110 mi (180 km)
- Basin size: 6,720 mi^{2} (17,400 km^{2})
- Discharge
  - location: Quinn River Sink, ~60 miles (97 km) northwest of Winnemucca, Nevada(evaporation)
  - average: 0 cu ft/s (0 m^{3}/s)

Basin features
- Tributaries
  - left: East Fork source: 41.850723°N 117.466245°W confluence: 41.973777°N 117.569305°W, South Fork source: 41.851556°N 117.475689°W confluence: 41.973499°N 117.569027°W
  - right: Kings River

The Quinn River, once known as the Queen River, is an intermittent river, approximately 110 miles (180 km) long, in the desert of northwestern Nevada in the United States. It drains an enclosed basin inside the larger Great Basin.

It rises in northeastern Humboldt County, on the west side of the Santa Rosa Range, just south of the Oregon state line. Its course flows southwest, through the main Nevada lands of the Fort McDermitt Paiute and Shoshone Tribes and then south and southwest, receiving the Kings River flowing south from Kings River Valley. The Quinn River evaporates in a sink at the Black Rock Desert, south of the Black Rock Range.

== Catchment ==
The Quinn River is the largest river in the region, starting in the Santa Rosa Range and ending in the Quinn River Sink on the playa south of the Black Rock Range. The watershed covers 11,600 sq mi (30,000 km^{2}) including the Upper and Lower Quinn River, Smoke Creek Desert, Massacre Lake, and Thousand Creek/Virgin Valley watersheds of northwestern Nevada as well as small parts across the border of Oregon.

== Quinn River Sink ==
The Quinn River Sink is the mouth of the Quinn River and is a geographic sink of around 3 square miles (7.8 km^{2}), where the Quinn River discharges and evaporates about 2.75 miles (4.43 km) south-southwest of Black Rock Hot Springs.

== See also ==
- List of rivers of the Great Basin
