= Record of decision =

US governmental formal decision document

A record of decision (ROD) in the United States is the formal decision document which is recorded for the public.

== EPA ==
In the US Environmental Protection Agency (EPA), a Record of Decision is a public document that explains a decision following an environmental review. It is commonly used to document the results and decisions at the end of a NEPA Environmental Impact Statement (EIS) process. A Record of Decision is also used to document the remediation plan for the clean up a Superfund site.

== FHWA ==
An ROD issued by the Federal Highway Administration (FHWA) signals formal federal approval of an environmental impact statement (EIS) or environmental assessment (EA) concerning a proposed highway project. The ROD authorizes the respective state transportation agency to proceed with design, land acquisition, and construction based on the availability of funds.

== Federal Register ==
The ROD is announced in a notice of availability (NOA) in the US government daily journal the Federal Register.

== See also ==
- Public records
