= Oregon Environmental Council =

American environmental advocacy group

- Oregon Environmental Council Inc.
- Formation: 1968; 58 years ago
- Type: Nonprofit
- Tax ID no.: 93-0578714
- Legal status: 501(c)(3)
- Headquarters: Portland, Oregon
- Executive Director: Jana Gastellum
- Board of directors: Bruce Abernethy; Debra Dunn; JJ Green; Michael Jung; Heidi Khokhar; Peter Koehler; Antonio Lara; David Lohman; Makely Lyon; Karen Moynahan; Doris Penwell; Elizabeth Silberg; Jean Wilson; Philip Wu
- Website: https://oeconline.org/

The Oregon Environmental Council (OEC) is an environmental advocacy group based in Portland, Oregon, United States. It was founded in 1968.

== History ==
The Oregon Environmental Council was founded in 1968 by a group of "ordinary citizens", including PTA and garden club members, outdoor enthusiasts, conservationists and other individuals who "had an interest in protecting the environmental legacy of Oregon".

== Current work ==
Current program work of the OEC includes public policy, addressing global warming, preventing toxic exposure, improving the quality of Oregon's rivers, sustainable economic issues, and food and farms. Andrea Durbin has been the group's executive director since 2006.

== Activities ==
Activities of the Oregon Environmental Council include:

- 1968 - Passed Mount Jefferson Wilderness Bill
- 1971 - Led citizen support that passed the Oregon Bottle Bill, the first bottle bill in the nation
- 1973 - Helped pass Oregon Senate Bills 100 and 101, Oregon's land use planning law
- 1975 - Secured National Recreation Area protection for Hells Canyon
- 1977 - Secured nation's first ban on certain ozone-depleting chemicals
- 1987 - Created Oregon Superfund Program and the Governor's Watershed Enhancement Board (now known as Oregon Watershed Enhancement Board)
- 1991 - Secured the nation's first law requiring state agencies to minimize pesticide use
- 1999 - Passed a Pesticide Right to Know Law guaranteeing public access to data about all commercial pesticide use in Oregon
- 2003 - Passed a first-of-its-kind tax incentive for insurance companies to offer Pay-as-You-Drive auto insurance
- 2006 - Won United States Environmental Protection Agency (EPA) Children's Environmental Health Excellence Award for their Eco-Healthy Child Care and Tiny Footprints programs that help parents and caregivers reduce children's exposure to toxic chemicals
- 2007 - Passed Climate Change Integration Act, setting greenhouse gas reduction goals for Oregon into statute and established statewide Global Warming Commission
- 2007 - Launched the Carbon Neutral Challenge for Oregon wineries, with dozens of Oregon wineries participating to reduce their carbon footprints
- 2008 - Released landmark "Pollution in People" report, which tested the bodies of 10 Oregon men and women for chemicals, followed by the "Price of Pollution" report, the state's first-ever economic assessment of the true costs of environmentally triggered disease in Oregon

== See also ==
- Land use in Oregon
