= Montana Mountains =

Mountain range in Humboldt County, Nevada, US

- Location within Nevada

Highest point
- Elevation: 2,174 m (7,133 ft)

Geography
- Country: United States
- State: Nevada
- District: Humboldt County
- Range coordinates: 41°47′54.626″N 118°6′32.550″W
- Topo map: USGS Jordan Meadow Mountain

The Montana Mountains are a mountain range in Humboldt County, Nevada. The mining company Lithium Americas Corporation is building a mine at Thacker Pass, which is between the Double H Mountains and the Montana Mountains. The highest point at 7,133 feet is an unnamed peak that unofficially goes by the benchmark on the summit named Mine Benchmark.
