= Oregon Canyon Mountains =

Mountain range in Oregon, US

- Location within Oregon

Highest point
- Elevation: 1,962 m (6,437 ft)

Geography
- Country: United States
- State: Oregon
- County: Malheur
- Range coordinates: 42°9′59.599″N 117°57′33.531″W
- Topo map: USGS Oregon Canyon Ranch

The Oregon Canyon Mountains are a mountain range in Malheur County, Oregon, east of the Trout Creek Mountains.
