= Double H Mountains =

Mountain range in Nevada, United States

- Location within Nevada

Highest point
- Elevation: 1,834 m (6,017 ft)

Geography
- Country: United States
- State: Nevada
- District: Humboldt County
- Range coordinates: 41°35′46.632″N 118°3′19.533″W
- Topo map: USGS Moonshine Canyon

The Double H Mountains are a mountain range in Humboldt County, Nevada. The northern end and eastward scape of the range define the southern margin of the McDermitt Caldera. They are located just south of Thacker Pass, the site of a controversial lithium mine.

== Climate and Habitat ==
Located in the northern Great Basin, the Double H Mountains have an arid, high-desert climate. The region experiences hot, dry summers and snowy winters. Local vegetation mainly consists of desert shrubs and grasses adapted to survive in arid conditions. Some common plant species in the region include sagebrush, bitterbrush, and yucca.

The Double H Mountains serve as a critical habitat and migration corridor for a variety of wildlife. As part of the North American "sagebrush steppe," the Double H Mountains are located in the habitat area of the greater sage-grouse. This mountainous region is also home to mule deer, golden eagles, mountain lions, bobcats, and California bighorn sheep, among other animals.

== History ==
Due to the site's volcanic history, the Double H Mountains contain a deposit of high-quality natural glass, known by archaeologists as the Double H/Whitehorse Obsidian Procurement District. Surveys, while limited, show that the region was a significant source of obsidian by ancient inhabitants for use in projectile points. Hydration profiles of obsidian artifacts date the use of the deposit back to the Paleoindian period, with some projectile samples increasing during the Post-Mazama and Early Archaic periods, reaching a peak in the Middle and Late Archaic, and dropping again thereafter. Archaeologists believe the obsidian was likely prized for its quality and color, with different outcrops in the area producing gray-green, green, purple, or blue obsidian. Points derived from Double H Mountain obsidian have been found in other parts of Nevada, evidencing a complex network in the transport of stone tools in the state's prehistory. Grinding stones and archeological evidence of other human activities have also been found in the area.

Today, there are local Paiute and Shoshone community members who still revere the Double H Mountains and surrounding area as a culturally significant landscape. Myron Smart, a tribal elder from Fort McDermitt, said in a 2021 radio broadcast opposing the Thacker Pass mine that the Double H deposit has been used by local Native Americans for thousands of years.

=== 2015 Bighorn Culling Event ===
In 2015, the Nevada Department of Wildlife (NDOW) was alerted to the presence of the bacteria Mycoplasma ovipneumoniae in a herd of bighorn sheep in the neighboring Montana Mountains. Following a severe die-off of the bighorns in the area, NDOW made the decision to cull a herd in the Double H Mountains due to their proximity to sick sheep in the Montana range. A total of 27 bighorns were removed. When NDOW examined 10 of the sheep, they found that many of them were sick with pneumonia. While some other states have taken similar action, this was the first time the state of Nevada culled a herd to prevent the spread of disease to other bighorns.
