= Spirit (franchise) =

DreamWorks Animation media franchise

- Created by: John Fusco; Jeffrey Katzenberg
- Original work: Spirit: Stallion of the Cimarron (2002)
- Owners: DreamWorks Animation (Universal Pictures)
- Years: 2002–2023

Films and television
- Films: Spirit: Stallion of the Cimarron (2002); Spirit Untamed (2021)
- Animated series: Spirit Riding Free (2017–2019); Spirit Riding Free: Pony Tales (2019); Spirit Riding Free: Riding Academy (2020); Spirit & Friends (2022–2023)
- Television specials: Spirit Riding Free: Spirit of Christmas (2019); Spirit Riding Free: Ride Along Adventure (2020)

Games
- Video games: Spirit: Forever Free (2002); Spirit: Search for Homeland (2002); Spirit Trick Challenge (2019); Spirit: Lucky's Big Adventure (2021)

Audio
- Soundtrack: Spirit: Stallion of the Cimarron (2002)
- Original music: "Here I Am"

Official website
- Spirit

Spirit is an American media franchise owned by DreamWorks Animation, which began with the 2002 animated film Spirit: Stallion of the Cimarron written by John Fusco from an idea by producer Jeffrey Katzenberg. The franchise follows the adventures of a Kiger Mustang stallion named Spirit and his same named descendants. The first film, Stallion of the Cimarron, received positive reviews from critics and was nominated for the Academy Award for Best Animated Feature at the 75th Academy Awards.

An animated television series, Spirit Riding Free, premiered on Netflix in 2017 and introduced new characters like Lucky Prescott, who became one of the franchise's main protagonists alongside Spirit. It spawned a short-form series titled Pony Tales, a spin-off series titled Riding Academy, and two television specials.

The television series served as the basis for the 2021 film Spirit Untamed, which is a re-imagined version of the show Spirit Riding Free.

== Films ==
=== Spirit: Stallion of the Cimarron (2002) ===
Spirit: Stallion of the Cimarron is a 2002 American animated adventure film produced by DreamWorks Animation and distributed by DreamWorks Pictures. It was directed by Kelly Asbury and Lorna Cook, in their feature directional debuts, from a screenplay by John Fusco.

Set in the Old West in the late 19th century, the film follows Spirit, a Kiger Mustang stallion (voiced by Matt Damon through inner dialogue), who is captured during the American Indian Wars by the United States Cavalry; he is freed by a Native American man named Little Creek who attempts to lead him back into the Lakota village.

The film was released in theaters on May 24, 2002. In July 2014, the film's distribution rights were purchased by DreamWorks Animation from Paramount Pictures (owners of the pre-2005 DreamWorks Pictures catalog) and transferred to 20th Century Fox before reverting to Universal Studios in 2018.

=== Spirit Untamed (2021) ===
Spirit Untamed is a 2021 American animated adventure film produced by DreamWorks Animation and distributed by Universal Pictures. The film is directed by Elaine Bogan, in her feature directorial debut, and co-directed by Ennio Torresan Jr.

It is a reboot and kind of a sequel of the traditional animated film Spirit: Stallion of the Cimarron and based on the characters from its spin-off television series Spirit Riding Free, created by Aury Wallington, who also co-wrote the screenplay with Kristin Hahn. The film is a re-imagined version of the series' story that follows a young girl named Fortuna "Lucky" Prescott who moves to the small rural community of Miradero, where she meets the titular wild kiger mustang whom she names "Spirit" and immediately begins to bond with him.

The film was released in the United States on June 4, 2021.

Film	U.S. release date	Director(s)	Screenwriter(s)	Producer(s)
Spirit: Stallion of the Cimarron	May 24, 2002	Lorna Cook & Kelly Asbury	John Fusco	Mireille Soria & Jeffrey Katzenberg
Spirit Untamed	June 4, 2021	Elaine Bogan & Ennio Torresan Jr.	Kristin Hahn & Aury Wallington	Karen Foster

== Television series ==
Series	Season	Episodes	Originally released		
Series	Season	Episodes	First released	Last released	Network
Riding Free	1	6	May 5, 2017		Netflix
Riding Free	2	7	September 8, 2017		Netflix
Riding Free	3	7	November 17, 2017		Netflix
Riding Free	4	6	March 16, 2018		Netflix
Riding Free	5	7	May 11, 2018		Netflix
Riding Free	6	6	August 17, 2018		Netflix
Riding Free	7	7	November 9, 2018		Netflix
Riding Free	8	6	April 5, 2019		Netflix
Riding Free: Pony Tales	1	6	August 9, 2019		Netflix
Riding Free: Pony Tales	2	4	October 18, 2019		Netflix
Riding Free: Riding Academy	1	7	April 3, 2020		Netflix
Riding Free: Riding Academy	2	9	September 4, 2020		Netflix
Spirit & Friends	1	20	February 12, 2022	March 28, 2023	YouTube; Peacock

=== Spirit Riding Free (2017–2019) ===
Spirit Riding Free is an animated spin-off television series, produced by DreamWorks Animation Television based on the traditionally animated film, Spirit: Stallion of the Cimarron. Created by Aury Wallington, it premiered on Netflix on May 5, 2017.

The series is set in small frontier town of Miradero and follows Lucky Prescott, a 12-year-old girl who had recently relocated from the city. She encounters a wild kiger mustang named Spirit. Lucky immediately bonds with the stallion and also makes friends with Pru Granger and Abigail Stone. Pru owns a palomino horse called Chica Linda, and Abigail has a pinto horse called Boomerang. The girls call themselves the PALs.

=== Webisodes (2017–2020) ===
A number of webisodes have been released exclusively (except for "Unstoppable Music Video") on the DreamWorks Spirit YouTube-channel during the course of the series.

No.	Title	Directed by	Written by	Storyboarded by	Original release date
1	"Magic Show"	Jim Schumann	Robert Taylor	Rick Lacy	August 22, 2017
2	"Rainy Day"	Jim Schumann	Robert Taylor	Kennedy Tarrell	November 7, 2017
3	"Mustang Mail Part 1"	Jim Schumann	Robert Taylor	Rick Lacy	January 16, 2018
4	"Mustang Mail Part 2"	Jim Schumann	Robert Taylor	Rick Lacy	January 23, 2018
5	"The Circus Mystery, Pt. 1: Magical New Tricks"	Joshua Taback	Robert Taylor	Jean Kang	July 24, 2018
6	"The Circus Mystery, Pt. 2: Kidnapping in Miradero"	Joshua Taback	Robert Taylor	Jean Kang	July 31, 2018
7	"The Circus Mystery, Pt. 3: The Bandit Standoff"	Joshua Taback	Robert Taylor	Jean Kang	August 7, 2018
8	"Adventure Music Video"	-	-	-	September 23, 2018
9	"Joy to the World (Christmas Music Video)"	-	-	-	December 11, 2018
10	"The Grooming Wagon, Pt. 1: Horse Cleaning Calamity"	-	-	-	January 15, 2019
11	"The Grooming Wagon, Pt. 2: Race Against the Clock"	-	-	-	January 22, 2019
12	"The Grooming Wagon, Pt. 3: A Soapy Success"	-	-	-	January 29, 2019
13	"Fast Friends: Abigail & Boomerang Meet for the FIRST Time!"	-	-	-	July 16, 2019
14	"Fast Friends: Pru & Chica Linda Meet for the FIRST Time!"	-	-	-	July 23, 2019
15	"Fast Friends: Lucky & Spirit Meet for the FIRST Time!"	-	-	-	July 30, 2019
16	"Unstoppable Music Video"	-	-	-	August 6, 2019
17	"A Friendly Race"	Allan Jacobsen	Nicole Belisle	Kat Chan, Laur Uy	June 17, 2020
18	"The Vet Is In"	Allan Jacobsen	Nicole Belisle	Kat Chan, Laur Uy	June 24, 2020
19	"Dressage Corsage"	Allan Jacobsen	Nicole Belisle	Kat Chan, Laur Uy	July 1, 2020

=== Spirit Riding Free: Pony Tales (2019) ===
Spirit Riding Free: Pony Tales is an animated short-form television series, produced by DreamWorks Animation Television and the second spin-off television series of Spirit: Stallion of the Cimarron and the first from the first television series Spirit Riding Free. It premiered on Netflix on August 9, 2019.

=== Spirit Riding Free: Riding Academy (2020) ===
Spirit Riding Free: Riding Academy is an animated television series, produced by DreamWorks Animation Television and the third spin-off television series of Spirit: Stallion of the Cimarron and the second from the television series Spirit Riding Free. It premiered on Netflix on April 3, 2020.

Lucky, Pru and Abigail are preparing to leave Miradero as they move away to boarding school at the Palomino Bluffs Riding Academy. After arriving at their new school, the girls are faced with fresh responsibilities and experiences. Meeting their new competition, the BUDs, makes their transition to the academy anything but easy. Along the way the PALs will make new friends and explore their individual talents as they grow up and discover their new home together.

=== Spirit & Friends (2022–2023) ===
On February 9, 2022, DreamWorks Animation Television announced a new series titled Spirit & Friends inspired by the characters from Spirit Riding Free, which takes place in the same setting of Spirit Untamed. It was released on YouTube on February 12. The cast trio of Spirit Untamed (Merced, Martin, and Grace) reprised their roles and all shorts were directed by Andrew Wilson with animation provided by Doberman Pictures and Top Draw Animation. The series was also released on Peacock months later after the release.

No.	Title	Written by	Storyboarded by	Original release date
1	"Chompy the Baby Mountain Lion"	Jessie Gant	Daniela Fischer	February 12, 2022
Lucky, Pru, and Abigail try to save a mountain lion cub, but who will save them when the mama comes back looking for her baby?
2	"Baby Ducklings"	Laura Sreebny	Renee Howerton	February 19, 2022
When the PALs find some duck eggs, they decide to take care of them until they're old enough to be on their own.
3	"Baby Bunny Breakout!"	Nicole Belisle	Daniela Fischer	February 26, 2022
When Lucky falls asleep while watching baby bunnies, it's up to the PALs and a filly to find them before the snake does.
4	"Lost Lamb on the Range"	Nicole Belisle	Hadas Rosen	March 5, 2022
The PALs set off to find a lost lamb. Will they find him before the wolf does?
5	"Bunny Gets His Bounce Back"	Alex Fernandez	Renee Howerton	April 2, 2022
Silver is all grown up and an awesome jumper, but when he is found limping, will the PALs do everything they can to get him jumping again?
6	"Foal’s First Check Up"	Martín Julio Castillo & Grace Murphy	Daniela Fischer	April 8, 2022
It's Checkup day at the ranch, but a little filly is scared of her first one. Will the PALs be able to coax her to get one?
7	"Keeping Up with a Three-Legged Pup"	Jonathan Hernandez	Hadas Rosen	April 16, 2022
8	"Marshmallow Mishaps"	Denisse De La Cruz	Renee Howerton	April 23, 2022
9	"What a Pigsty!"	-	-	July 30, 2022
10	"Invasion of the Apple Snatchers"	-	-	August 6, 2022
11	"Feista Fiasco"	-	-	August 13, 2022
12	"Kittens, Kittens Everywhere"	-	-	August 20, 2022
13	"Creepy Campfire Story Comes to Life"	-	-	September 24, 2022
14	"Abigail's Fantastic Flea Remedy"	-	-	November 5, 2022
15	"A Christmas Llama Miracle"	-	-	November 12, 2022
16	"The Mystery of the Candy Stealing Ghost"	-	-	November 19, 2022
17	"Lucky vs Donkey: Who's More Stubborn?"	-	-	January 16, 2023
18	"Save the Goats!"	-	-	January 16, 2023
19	"Lost Kitty Finds an Unexpected Home"	-	-	March 14, 2023
20	"Pru's Amazing Rodeo Audition!"	-	-	March 28, 2023

== Television specials ==
=== Spirit Riding Free: Spirit of Christmas (2019) ===
Spirit Riding Free: Spirit of Christmas is a Christmas special which premiered on Netflix on December 6, 2019. The special starred the characters from Spirit Riding Free television series.

Lucky and her friends embark on a Christmas Eve adventure into the city to find the perfect gift, but their return to Miradero for the holiday festivities are ruined when an avalanche derails their plans.

=== Spirit Riding Free: Ride Along Adventure (2020) ===
Spirit Riding Free: Ride Along Adventure is an interactive special which premiered on Netflix on December 8, 2020.

In this special, Lucky and her friends go on a mission to save Maricela's beloved mare, Mystery, from greedy horse thieves who've taken her captive with a wild herd.

== Cast and crew ==
=== Cast and characters ===
List indicators

This section includes characters who will appear or have appeared in in the franchise.

- An empty grey cell indicates the character was not in the film, or that the character's official presence has not yet been confirmed.
- ^{A} indicates an appearance through archival footage or audio.
- ^{Y} indicates a younger version of the character.

Characters	Feature films		Television series			Web series	Television special(s)	
Characters	Spirit: Stallion of the Cimarron	Spirit Untamed						
Characters	Spirit: Stallion of the Cimarron	Spirit Untamed	Spirit Riding Free	Pony Tales	Riding Academy	Spirit & Friends	Spirit of Christmas	Ride Along Adventure
Spirit	Matt Damon	Silent	Silent	Silent	Silent	Silent	Silent	Silent
Little Creek	Daniel Studi							
Lucky Prescott		Isabela Merced Bridget Hoffman^{Y}	Amber Frank	Amber Frank	Amber Frank	Isabela Merced	Amber Frank	Amber Frank
Pru Granger		Marsai Martin	Sydney Park	Sydney Park	Sydney Park	Marsai Martin	Sydney Park	Sydney Park
Abigail Stone		Mckenna Grace	Bailey Gambertoglio	Bailey Gambertoglio	Bailey Gambertoglio	Mckenna Grace	Bailey Gambertoglio	Bailey Gambertoglio
Snips Stone		Lucian Perez	Duncan Joiner	Duncan Joiner	Duncan Joiner		Duncan Joiner	Duncan Joiner
James “Jim” Prescott Jr.		Jake Gyllenhaal	Nolan North	Nolan North	Nolan North		Nolan North	
Cora Prescott		Julianne Moore	Kari Wahlgren		Kari Wahlgren		Kari Wahlgren	
Al Granger		Andre Braugher	Jonathan Craig Williams	Jonathan Craig Williams	Jonathan Craig Williams		Jonathan Craig Williams	
Maricela Gutierrez			Darcy Rose Byrnes	Darcy Rose Byrnes	Darcy Rose Byrnes		Darcy Rose Byrnes	Darcy Rose Byrnes
Turo			Andy Pessoa	Andy Pessoa	Character is Mute			
Bianca and Mary Pat			Gabriella Graves	Gabriella Graves	Gabriella Graves		Gabriella Graves	
Fannie Granger			Dawnn Lewis	Dawnn Lewis	Dawnn Lewis		Character is Mute	
Kathryn "Kate" Flores			Tiya Sircar		Tiya Sircar		Tiya Sircar	
Julian Prescott			Lucas Grabeel					
James Prescott Sr.		Joe Hart	Victor Garber (1st voice) Nolan North (2nd voice)		Victor Garber^{A}			
Milagro Navarro		Eiza González	Natalie Otano					
Tito			Eric Lopez					
Estrella			Marite Mantilla					
Solana			Lilimar Hernandez					
Javier			Andy Aragon					
Mixtli			Bridger Zadina	Bridger Zadina				
Miz McDonnell			Christine Baranaski	Christine Baranaski				
Major Gutierrez			Christian Lanz	Christian Lanz				
Mrs. Hungerford			Julie Brown	Julie Brown				
Bebe Schumann				Julia Lester	Julia Lester			
Daphne				Georgia Dolenz	Georgia Dolenz			
Ursula Lin Yang				Charlet Chung	Charlet Chung			
Headmaster Perkins					Rhys Darby			
Lydia Sterling					Kitana Turnbull			
Jack					Paul-Mikél Williams			
Saher Kapoor					Karan Brar			
Priya Kapoor					Roshni Edwards			
Alex Fox					Justin Felbenger			
Beef					Austin Kane			
Dr. Annalisa Cope					Briana León			
Coach Bradley					Jane Lynch			
Major Schumann					Rob Riggle			
Mr. Daniels					Piotr Michael			
Tyler					Benjamin Flores Jr.			
Mr. Gael						Carlos Alazraqui		
Anahí						TBA		
Mrs. Johnson						TBA		
Banks Beller						TBA		
Sally Jessup							Katherine McNamara	
The Colonel	James Cromwell							
Sgt. Adams	Chopper Bernet							
Hendricks		Walton Goggins						
Harlan Grayson			James Patrick Stuart					
Butch LePray			Katey Sagal					Katey Sagal
Rooster			Thomas Lennon					
Frankie LePray								Rachel Kimsey

=== Crew ===
Role	Spirit: Stallion of the Cimarron	Spirit Untamed
Role	2002	2021
Director(s)	Kelly Asbury; Lorna Cook	Elaine Bogan Co-Directed by: Ennio Torresan Jr.
Producer(s)	Mireille Soria; Jeffrey Katzenberg	Karen Foster
Screenplay by	John Fusco	Aury Wallington; Kristin Hahn
Composer(s)	Hans Zimmer	Amie Doherty
Editor(s)	Nick Fletcher; Clare De Chenu	R. Orlando Duenas
Studio(s)	DreamWorks Animation	DreamWorks Animation
Animation producer(s)	DWA Glendale; Anvil Studios; Bardel Entertainment; Stardust Pictures	Jellyfish Pictures; 88 Pictures; Minimo VFX
Distributor(s)	DreamWorks Pictures	Universal Pictures
Running time	84 minutes	85 minutes

== Reception ==
=== Box office performance ===
Film	Release date	Box office gross			Budget	Ref.
Film	Release date	North America	Other territories	Worldwide	Budget	Ref.
Spirit: Stallion of the Cimarron	May 24, 2002	$73,280,117	$49,283,422	$122,563,539	$80 million	
Spirit Untamed	June 4, 2021	$17,716,215	$25,001,000	$42,717,215	$30 million	
Total		$90,996,332	$74,284,422	$165,280,754	$110 million	

=== Critical and public response ===
Critical and public response of Spirit films
Film	Critical		Public	
Film	Rotten Tomatoes	Metacritic	CinemaScore	PostTrak
Spirit: Stallion of the Cimarron	69% (123 reviews)	52 (29 reviews)	A	—N/a
Spirit Untamed	48% (115 reviews)	49 (23 reviews)	A	75%

== Video games ==
Year	Title	Developer(s)	Publisher(s)	Platform(s)	Ref.
2002	Spirit: Stallion of the Cimarron — Forever Free	The Fizz Factor	THQ	Windows	
2002	Spirit: Stallion of the Cimarron — Search for Homeland	Hyperspace Cowgirls	THQ	Game Boy Advance	
2019	Spirit Trick Challenge	DreamWorks Animation	DreamWorks Animation	Android / iOS	
2021	Spirit: Lucky's Big Adventure	aheartfulofgames	Outright Games LTD.	Windows / PlayStation 4 / Xbox One / Nintendo Switch	

== Book series ==
Shortly after the movie, a book series called “Spirit of the West” was released by writer Kathleen Duey; telling the story of Spirit's family lineage and herd.

== Music ==
=== Soundtracks ===
Title	U.S. release date	Length	Label
Spirit: Stallion of the Cimarron - Music from the Original Motion Picture	May 4, 2002	59:55	A&M Records
Spirit Riding Free: Spirit of Christmas - EP	December 6, 2019	10:42	Back Lot Music
Spirit Untamed (Original Motion Picture Soundtrack)	May 28, 2021	68:06	Back Lot Music

=== Singles ===
Title	U.S. release date	Length	Artist(s)	Label	Film/Series
"Here I Am"	June 11, 2002	4:06	Bryan Adams	A&M Records	Spirit: Stallion of the Cimarron
"Riding Free"	May 25, 2017	3:07	Maisy Stella	Back Lot Music	Spirit Riding Free
"Friends Forever"	November 7, 2017	1:56	Amber Frank, Sydney Park and Bailey Gambertoglio	Back Lot Music	Spirit Riding Free
"Unstoppable"	May 3, 2019	2:40	Amber Frank, Sydney Park and Bailey Gambertoglio	Back Lot Music	Spirit Riding Free: Pony Tales
"Fearless (Valiente Duet)"	May 6, 2021	4:14	Isabela Merced and Eiza González	Back Lot Music	Spirit Untamed
"You Belong"	May 20, 2021	3:16	Becky G	Back Lot Music	Spirit Untamed
