= Spirit Untamed (soundtrack) =

2021 soundtrack album

Spirit Untamed (Original Motion Picture Soundtrack)

Film score by Amie Doherty
- Released: May 28, 2021
- Recorded: 2021
- Genre: Film score
- Length: 1:08:06
- Label: Back Lot Music
- Producers: Amie Doherty; Elaine Bogan

Amie Doherty chronology
Happiest Season (2020)	Spirit Untamed (2021)	Please Don't Destroy: The Treasure of Foggy Mountain (2023)

Singles from Spirit Untamed (Original Motion Picture Soundtrack)
- 1. "Fearless (Valiente Duet)" Released: May 7, 2021; 2. "You Belong" Released: May 21, 2021

Spirit Untamed (Original Motion Picture Soundtrack) is the score album for the 2021 DreamWorks Animation film Spirit Untamed. A spin-off as well as the stand-alone sequel and reboot of the traditionally animated Spirit: Stallion of the Cimarron (2002), it is the second theatrical film of the Spirit franchise and is loosely based on the characters from its Netflix animated spin-off television series Spirit Riding Free (2017–2020).

The original score is composed by Amie Doherty, becoming the first woman to compose for a DreamWorks film; she is also the seventh composer to work on the franchise, (Note: Spirit franchise composers: Hans Zimmer composed the original film Spirit: Stallion of the Cimarron (2002).; Kari Kimmel composed the theme music for Spirit Riding Free; Joachim Horsley scored for the first season of Riding Free, while James Allen Roberson scored the second season, and served as the recurring score composer working till the eighth season of the series.; Sunna Wehrmeijer and Peter Bateman scored for the Riding Free webisodes Pony Tales and Riding Academy.) and the second to score a Spirit film after Hans Zimmer, who composed the score for Spirit: Stallion of the Cimarron. The soundtrack album was released by Back Lot Music on May 28, 2021 and spawned two singles prior to its release: "Fearless (Valiente Duet)" and "You Belong".

== Production ==
Amie Doherty was hired to score for the film in early 2021. She was recommended by Mike Knobloch, President of Music and Publishing at NBCUniversal for the film, after she previously scored for the DreamWorks Animation's short film Marooned (2018), as a part of Universal Composers Initiative. Doherty liked the original film and the songs and score by Bryan Adams and Hans Zimmer, when she was 15, and had a significant impact. However, while scoring for the film, she did not refer to Zimmer's themes from the original, and worked on a fresh score, with the approach being organic. While consisting of largely orchestral music, the instrumentation ranges from acoustic guitars, nylon guitar and vocal harmonies, to give a partly western feel and mostly orchestral moments to "encapsulate the breadth of the stunning landscapes on screen".

She composed and wrote an original track "Fearless", a lullaby number which was used when Lucky's mother Milagro (Eiza González) sings to her young daughter. She used the melody from that track to weave into the themes of the film score. In her first songwriting stint, Doherty while writing this track, avoided themes that were female-centric including "beauty" and "girl things" and felt that "it could be sung to any child". The song was written within an hour, with words that reinforced the importance of embracing one's roots. Stating to an interview to Variety, she said "I wrote this melody and added placeholder lyrics, and everyone had discussed they would bring on a lyricist. But in the end, they used the song with those lyrics". "Fearless" later used three times in the film — the second instance, where Lucky singing it to herself for motivation and her father Jim (Jake Gyllenhaal) singing in the end. On Gyllenhaal's singing stint, Doherty said that it was "very funny and endearing", while adding that "she had 50 or 60 takes of him going way out there and then like bringing us all to tears with a super sweet version".

The score was recorded by blending contemporary folk rock with traditional music. She further used Spanish guitars to tie Milagro's Mexican culture with the Western American setting, and further combined the symphonic sound of the orchestra with mariachi trumpets, bluegrass fiddles and nylon/Spanish guitar, so as to represent "the mixture of cultures in this particular time and place". Robin Pecknold of Fleet Foxes provided vocal harmonies for the score along with Eiza González. Both Doherty and Elaine Mogan were fans of Fleet Foxes and the former felt that working with Pecknold would give a "modern addition to the film score", though his involvement was undisclosed, before he was officially onboard for the film.

In addition to the traditional, modern and orchestral versions, Doherty learnt to use spaghetti music in the "Fantasy Sequence" as "the scene steps outside the “norms” or “rules” of the film in many ways, both visually and in sound design", resulting Doherty to have the score being reflected in a similar way. She used traditional spaghetti western sounds by blending opera, male choir, percussions, tremolo baritone guitar and harmonica, while the sequence also inspired use of power chords to give a "fantastical, punchy, exciting feeling". For a sequence where, Lucky first tries to ride Spirit, Doherty explained about scoring the sequence saying "The trick to scoring the “dance” was to find the right tempo to hit their footwork. It starts out quite tentative, and as Lucky begins to learn and Spirit begins to trust, the music becomes more rhythmic and stable, and concludes with a variation on Spirit’s theme as they edge closer to each other."

== Release ==
The first of two singles from the film, titled "Fearless (Valiente Duet)", written by Doherty and performed by Isabela Merced and Eiza González was released on May 7, 2021. The second song "You Belong", performed by Becky G, was released on May 21, 2021. A soundtrack of the film was released on May 28, 2021 by Back Lot Music.

== Track listing ==
All music is composed by Amie Doherty, except as noted.

No.	Title	Writer(s)	Artist	Length
1.	"You Belong"	Michael Pollack; Zach Skelton; Casey Smith; Jake Torrey	Becky G	3:16
2.	"Fearless"	Amie Doherty	Isabela Merced	4:15
3.	"Better With You"	Lindsey Bachelder; Garrison Starr	Merced	2:57
4.	"Be Fearless, Fortuna!"		Doherty; Robin Pecknold; Eiza González	1:52
5.	"Squirrel Chase"		Doherty	1:01
6.	"Meeting Spirit & Main Title"		Doherty; Pecknold	2:46
7.	"Welcome to Miradero"		Doherty	2:02
8.	"Everybody Knew Milagro"		Doherty	1:27
9.	"Snips & Abigail"		Doherty	1:46
10.	"You Look Just Like Your Mom"		Doherty; Pecknold	3:07
11.	"Hendricks Tries to Break Spirit"		Doherty	2:10
12.	"Getting Familiar"		Doherty	2:09
13.	"Takes Two To Tango"		Doherty	2:36
14.	"Wild Ride"		Doherty	3:16
15.	"Fireflies"		Doherty; Pecknold; González	2:50
16.	"Spirit’s Herd"		Doherty; Pecknold	2:45
17.	"Wranglers"		Doherty; Pecknold	2:40
18.	"Ridge of Regret"		Doherty	1:14
19.	"I Am The Train"		Doherty	1:48
20.	"The Two-Hand Pickup"		Doherty	1:53
21.	"Rescue Mission"		Doherty	2:10
22.	"Leap of Faith"		Doherty	3:40
23.	"Hero Dads"		Doherty	2:34
24.	"Stay Wild, Brave One"		Doherty; Pecknold	3:20
25.	"Fearless (Valiente Duet)"	Doherty	Merced; González	4:14
26.	"You Belong (Tu Lugar)"	Pollack; Skelton; Smith; Torrey	Becky G	3:16
27.	"Join Up"	Elaine Bogan	Mckenna Grace; Marsai Martin; Merced	1:05

== Additional music ==
Some of the songs that are not featured in the soundtrack, but included in the film are: "Hail to the Chief" written by James Sanderson, (Note: It is the personal anthem of the President of the United States) "Ragged Wood" written by Robin Pecknold of Fleet Foxes, and performed by the band from their self-titled studio album, and "Fiesta" performed by Mariachi La Estrella. "Riding Free", the theme song from Spirit Riding Free by Kari Kimmel, is featured in the film only to be a western piano version. Jake Gyllenhaal's rendition of "Fearless" is not featured in the soundtrack. Taylor Swift had re-recorded her 2015 song "Wildest Dreams" that was featured in the trailers of the film. However, it was not featured in the soundtrack as well as in the film, and the song was released as a single on September 17, 2021.

== Charts ==
Chart (2021)	Peak position
US Billboard 200	161
US Soundtrack Albums (Billboard)	23
