= DreamWorks Animation Television =

American television animation studio and production company

- Logo used since 2012
- Formerly: DreamWorks Television Animation (1996–1999)
- Type: Division
- Industry: Animation; Television production
- Predecessors: DreamWorks Television Animation
- Founded: 1996; 30 years ago (as DreamWorks Television Animation); 2013; 13 years ago (as DreamWorks Animation Television)
- Founders: Steven Spielberg; Jeffrey Katzenberg; David Geffen
- Defunct: 1999; 27 years ago (first incarnation)
- Headquarters: 1000 Flower Street; Glendale, California; 91201
- Areas served: Worldwide
- Products: Animated television series
- Parent: DreamWorks Television (1996–1999); DreamWorks Animation (2013–present)
- Website: dreamworks.com/shows

DreamWorks Animation Television (formerly DreamWorks Television Animation, abbreviated as DWATV) is an American animation studio that serves as the television production arm of DreamWorks Animation, itself a subsidiary of Universal Pictures and a division of Comcast's NBCUniversal. Its first programs from the 1990s and early 2000s used the live-action television logo, and were produced by DreamWorks Television, before DWATV and its parent company were spun off into an independent company in 2004 and later purchased by NBCUniversal in 2016. In total, the division has released 60 programs, with 6 in development.

== History ==
The company was first formed in 1996 as the animation division of DreamWorks Television, a subsidiary of the main live-action DreamWorks Pictures studio. DreamWorks Pictures also had an animated film subsidiary named DreamWorks Animation, although DreamWorks Television Animation did not operate as a subsidiary of it in the 1990s. DreamWorks' television division was spearheaded by Jeffrey Katzenberg and Steven Spielberg and was headed by former Walt Disney Television Animation executives Gary Krisel and David Simon. DWTA only produced two series: Invasion America and Toonsylvania. In a move to consolidate, DreamWorks Television Animation was shut down in 1999 with the direct-to-video subsidiary subsequently merged into the studio's feature animation division, as a way for the company to reorganize its animation divisions to operate under one umbrella. More than two-thirds of the television division's 50 employees were transferred to the direct-to-video unit and it was expected that only a minimal number of employees would be affected by the reorganization.

In September 2001, an animated series for Fox Kids titled Alienators: Evolution Continues was produced, based on the 2001 live-action film Evolution, which was released earlier in 2001 by DreamWorks Pictures in North America, with Columbia Pictures handling international distribution. Since DreamWorks Television Animation had shut down by this point, the series was handled by DIC Entertainment along with the main DreamWorks Television division (Columbia TriStar Television would be credited in DreamWorks' place in foreign territories). It lasted 26 episodes before being cancelled in 2002.

In August 2004, DreamWorks Animation produced their first animated television series, a 3D animated series titled Father of the Pride for NBC. It too would be short-lived, only lasting one season consisting of 15 episodes.

In December 2005, it was announced that Paramount Pictures' parent company Viacom was purchasing DreamWorks' live-action film and television studios, with the $1.6 billion deal being finalized at the beginning of February 2006. The deal included the library of the defunct DreamWorks Television Animation, as well as including a six-year distribution agreement for past and future DreamWorks Animation films, with DreamWorks Animation having split into its own separate company in October 2004. Viacom's children's division Nickelodeon were also given the rights to co-produce television shows based on characters from DreamWorks Animation films. The rights to Father of the Pride remained with DreamWorks Animation when it spun off from DreamWorks Pictures in October 2004. Paramount gained partial ownership of Alienators: Evolution Continues, as the rights to this show were originally split between DIC Entertainment and DreamWorks Television, with DiC catalog holder WildBrain currently holding distribution rights. DreamWorks' live-action film and television studios briefly operated as labels of Paramount, before becoming independent entities again in late 2008, due to internal tensions. Following the split, Paramount still retained the rights to the libraries of DreamWorks Pictures, DreamWorks Television and DreamWorks Television Animation; the split also did not affect its ongoing distribution agreement with DreamWorks Animation. Paramount's distribution agreement with DreamWorks Animation ended on December 31, 2012, and in July 2014, DreamWorks Animation announced they had reacquired the distribution rights to their films from Paramount, transferring these rights to their new theatrical and home video distribution partner 20th Century Fox.

In 2013, DreamWorks Animation entered a multi-year content deal with Netflix to provide 300 hours of exclusive original content. The intent of the deal was to establish a reliable income for the studio to defray the financial risk of solely relying on the theatrical film market. The next day, DWA completed a five-year licensing agreement with Super RTL for the Classic Media library and the Netflix slate. DWA announced executive hiring for its new television group, DreamWorks Animation Television in late July. Former Nickelodeon senior executive Margie Cohn became Head of Television for the group. In September that same year, DreamWorks announced that it has acquired the television library of London-based Chapman Entertainment with the programs to distributed through DWA's UK-based television distribution operation.

In late 2014, DreamWorks Animation launched its own channel called the DreamWorks Channel. DreamWorks made a deal with HBO Asia to handle affiliate sales, marketing and technical services, the network will launch in several Asian countries (excluding China and Japan) in the second half of 2015. The channel first premiered in English on August 1, 2015, and a Thai-dubbed channel launched in September 2015. In 2016, DreamWorks Animation Television and its parent company were purchased by Comcast through its NBCUniversal subsidiary.

== Television series ==
=== Released ===
#	Title	Creator(s) / Developer(s)	Year(s)		Network	Co-production with	Production services
#	Title	Creator(s) / Developer(s)	Premiere date	End date	Network	Co-production with	Production services
1	Toonsylvania (Note: Retained by the live-action DreamWorks studio after the 2004 split; currently owned by Paramount Pictures via DW Studios)	Bill Kopp; Mike Peters; Chris Otsuki	February 7, 1998	January 18, 1999	Fox Kids	—N/a	Fil-Cartoons
2	Invasion America	Steven Spielberg; Harve Bennett	June 8, 1998	July 7, 1998	The WB	—N/a	AKOM; Studio B Productions
3	Father of the Pride	Jeffrey Katzenberg; Jonathan Groff	August 31, 2004	December 28, 2004	NBC	—N/a	Imagi Animation Studios; PDI/DreamWorks
4	The Penguins of Madagascar	Mark McCorkle; Bob Schooley	November 28, 2008	December 19, 2015	Nickelodeon (2008–2012); Nicktoons (2013–2015)	Nickelodeon Animation Studio	Oktobor Animation; CGCG; DQ Entertainment; Paprikaas Interactive Services
5	Neighbors from Hell (Note: Credited as MoonBoy Animation)	Pam Brady	June 7, 2010	July 26, 2010	TBS	Wounded Poodle; 20th Century Fox Television	Bardel Entertainment; Bento Box Entertainment
6	Kung Fu Panda: Legends of Awesomeness	Peter Hastings	September 19, 2011	June 29, 2016	Nickelodeon (2011–2014); Nicktoons (2016)	Nickelodeon Animation Studio	Paprikaas Animation Studios; Oktobor Animation; Cinepix
7	DreamWorks Dragons	Linda Teverbaugh; Mike Teverbaugh	August 7, 2012	February 16, 2018	Cartoon Network (2012–2014); Netflix (2015–2018)	—N/a	CGCG; Original Force; The Monk Studio; Technicolor Animation Productions; Tata Elxsi; 37 Entertainment; House of Cool
8	Monsters vs. Aliens	Mark McCorkle; Bob Schooley	March 23, 2013	February 8, 2014	Nickelodeon	Nickelodeon Animation Studio	Oktobor Animation; Bardel Entertainment
9	Turbo Fast	Jack Thomas	December 24, 2013	February 5, 2016	Netflix	Titmouse, Inc.	Titmouse, Inc. Robin Red Breast; Dong Woo Animation; SMIP, Inc.
10	VeggieTales in the House (Note: Although DreamWorks Animation Television helped produce VeggieTales in the House and its follow-up VeggieTales in the City, they went uncredited in both of those shows.)	Doug TenNapel	November 26, 2014	September 23, 2016	Netflix	Big Idea Productions; DreamWorks Classics	Bardel Entertainment
11	All Hail King Julien	Bret Haaland	December 19, 2014	December 1, 2017	Netflix	—N/a	Bardel Entertainment; Technicolor Animation Productions
12	The Adventures of Puss in Boots	Doug Langdale	January 16, 2015	January 26, 2018	Netflix	—N/a	Bardel Entertainment; Dave Enterprises
13	Dinotrux	Ron Burch; David Kidd	August 14, 2015	August 3, 2018	Netflix	—N/a	Bardel Entertainment; Technicolor Animation Productions; Dave Enterprises
14	The Mr. Peabody & Sherman Show	David P. Smith	October 9, 2015	April 21, 2017	Netflix	Jay Ward Productions; DreamWorks Classics	DHX Media Vancouver; Top Draw Animation
15	Dawn of the Croods	Brendan Hay	December 24, 2015	July 7, 2017	Netflix	—N/a	Bardel Entertainment; Digital eMation; NE4U; Dong Woo Animation; Toon City
16	Noddy, Toyland Detective	Heath Kenny; Myles McLeod	April 2, 2016	March 22, 2020	France 5 (France); Channel 5 (United Kingdom); Universal Kids (United States)	Gaumont Animation	Xentrix Studios
17	Voltron: Legendary Defender	Joaquim Dos Santos; Lauren Montgomery	June 10, 2016	December 14, 2018	Netflix	World Events Productions	Studio Mir
18	Home: Adventures with Tip & Oh	Ryan Crego; Thurop Van Orman	July 29, 2016	July 20, 2018	Netflix	—N/a	Titmouse, Inc.
19	Trollhunters: Tales of Arcadia	Guillermo del Toro	December 23, 2016	May 25, 2018	Netflix	Double Dare You Productions	88 Pictures; Arc Productions; Assemblage Entertainment; CGCG; House of Cool; Nitrogen Studios; Original Force
20	VeggieTales in the City	Doug TenNapel	February 24, 2017	September 15, 2017	Netflix	Big Idea Productions	Bardel Entertainment
21	Spirit Riding Free	Aury Wallington	May 5, 2017	December 8, 2020	Netflix	—N/a	Technicolor Animation Productions; Toiion; Dave Enterprises; The Monk Studio
22	Trolls: The Beat Goes On!	Matthew Beans; Hannah Friedman; Sam Friedman	January 19, 2018	November 22, 2019	Netflix	—N/a	Digital eMation; NE4U
23	The Boss Baby: Back in Business	Brandon Sawyer	April 6, 2018	November 17, 2020	Netflix	—N/a	Technicolor Animation Productions; Dave Enterprises
24	The Adventures of Rocky and Bullwinkle	Marco Schnabel; David P. Smith	May 11, 2018	January 11, 2019	Amazon Prime Video	Jay Ward Productions	DHX Media Vancouver; Yeson Entertainment
25	Harvey Girls Forever!	Emily Brundige	June 29, 2018	January 10, 2020	Netflix	—N/a	Dave Enterprises; NE4U
26	The Epic Tales of Captain Underpants	Peter Hastings; Mark Banker	July 13, 2018	July 10, 2020	Netflix	—N/a	Titmouse, Inc. Dave Enterprises; Stoopid Buddy Studios; Inspidea
27	She-Ra and the Princesses of Power	ND Stevenson	November 13, 2018	May 15, 2020	Netflix	Mattel Television	NE4U; Dave Enterprises
28	Kung Fu Panda: The Paws of Destiny	Elliott Owen	November 16, 2018	July 4, 2019	Amazon Prime Video	—N/a	Bardel Entertainment; The Monk Studio
29	3Below: Tales of Arcadia	Guillermo del Toro	December 21, 2018	July 12, 2019	Netflix	Double Dare You Productions	Original Force; CGCG; 88 Pictures; House of Cool
30	Where's Waldo?	Koyalee Chanda; Lucas Mills	July 20, 2019	July 3, 2021	Universal Kids (2019); Peacock (2020–21)	—N/a	Snipple Animation Studios; Dave Enterprises
31	Archibald's Next Big Thing	Tony Hale; Drew Champion; Jacob Moffat	September 6, 2019	October 14, 2021	Netflix (2019–2020); Peacock (2021)	—N/a	Dave Enterprises; Titmouse, Inc.
32	DreamWorks Dragons: Rescue Riders	Jack Thomas; Johnny Belt; Robert Scull	September 27, 2019	September 29, 2022	Netflix (2019–2020); Peacock (2021–22)	—N/a	Bardel Entertainment; Dave Enterprises; Technicolor Animation Productions; The Monk Studio; 88 Pictures
33	Cleopatra in Space	Doug Langdale; Julia "Fitzy" Fitzmaurice	November 25, 2019 (Asia); April 15, 2020 (United States)	June 25, 2021	DreamWorks Channel (Asia); Peacock (United States)	—N/a	Titmouse, Inc. Inspidea; Digitoonz
34	Fast & Furious: Spy Racers	Tim Hedrick; Bret Haaland	December 26, 2019	December 17, 2021	Netflix	Universal Television	Technicolor Animation Productions; 88 Pictures; The Monk Studio
35	Kipo and the Age of Wonderbeasts	Radford Sechrist; Bill Wolkoff	January 14, 2020	October 12, 2020	Netflix	—N/a	Studio Mir
36	Rhyme Time Town	Dan Berlinka	June 19, 2020	June 15, 2021	Netflix	—N/a	Doberman Pictures; Top Draw Animation
37	Wizards: Tales of Arcadia	Guillermo del Toro; Aaron Waltke; Marc Guggenheim; Chad Quandt	August 7, 2020		Netflix	Double Dare You Productions	88 Pictures; CGCG
38	Madagascar: A Little Wild	Dana Starfield	September 7, 2020	June 30, 2022	Peacock; Hulu	—N/a	Mainframe Studios
39	Jurassic World: Camp Cretaceous	Zack Stentz	September 18, 2020	July 21, 2022	Netflix	Universal Television; Amblin Entertainment	CGCG
40	The Mighty Ones	Sunil Hall; Lynne Naylor	November 9, 2020	December 9, 2022	Peacock; Hulu	—N/a	Snipple Animation Studios
41	Doug Unplugs	Jim Nolan; Aliki Theofilopoulos; Dan Yaccarino	November 13, 2020	April 1, 2022	Apple TV+	—N/a	CGCG; Dave Enterprises
42	Trolls: TrollsTopia	Matthew Beans; Hannah Friedman; Sam Friedman	November 19, 2020	August 11, 2022	Peacock; Hulu	—N/a	Atomic Cartoons
43	Gabby's Dollhouse	Traci Paige Johnson; Jennifer Twomey	January 5, 2021	present	Netflix	—N/a	Technicolor Animation Productions; Doberman Pictures; Dave Enterprises; One-Take Floyd; CGCG
44	Go, Dog. Go!	Adam Peltzman	January 26, 2021	November 27, 2023	Netflix	WildBrain Studios	
45	The Croods: Family Tree	Mark Banker; Todd Grimes	September 23, 2021	November 9, 2023	Peacock; Hulu	—N/a	Technicolor Animation Productions; Dave Enterprises
46	DreamWorks Dragons: The Nine Realms	Henry Gilroy	December 23, 2021	December 14, 2023	Peacock; Hulu	—N/a	Technicolor Animation Productions; CGCG; Dave Enterprises
47	Team Zenko Go	Jack Thomas	March 15, 2022	August 8, 2022	Netflix	Mainframe Studios	
48	Pinecone & Pony	Stephanie Kaliner	April 8, 2022	February 3, 2023	Apple TV+	Atomic Cartoons; First Generation Films	Atomic Cartoons
49	The Boss Baby: Back in the Crib	Brandon Sawyer	May 19, 2022	April 13, 2023	Netflix	—N/a	Technicolor Animation Productions; Toiion
50	Kung Fu Panda: The Dragon Knight	Mitch Watson; Peter Hastings	July 14, 2022	September 7, 2023	Netflix	—N/a	Technicolor Animation Productions/Mikros Animation; Dave Enterprises; Stellar Creative Labs; 88 Pictures
51	Abominable and the Invisible City	Katherine Nolfi	October 5, 2022	March 29, 2023	Peacock; Hulu	—N/a	CGCG; Dave Enterprises
52	Not Quite Narwhal	Sarah Katin; Nakia Trower Shuman	June 19, 2023	January 22, 2024	Netflix	—N/a	Lemon Sky Studios
53	Dew Drop Diaries	Rick Suvalle	July 24, 2023	December 4, 2023	Netflix	—N/a	TeamTO
54	Fright Krewe	Eli Roth; James Frey	October 2, 2023	March 29, 2024	Peacock; Hulu	—N/a	Digitoonz
55	Curses!	Jeff Dixon; Jim Cooper	October 27, 2023	October 4, 2024	Apple TV+	Sunday Night Productions	CGCG
56	Megamind Rules!	Alan Schoolcraft; Brent Simons	March 1, 2024	June 20, 2024	Peacock	—N/a	88 Pictures
57	Jurassic World: Chaos Theory	Scott Kreamer; Zack Stentz	May 24, 2024	November 20, 2025	Netflix	Universal Television; Amblin Entertainment	CGCG; Saffronic
58	Mighty MonsterWheelies	Kyel White	October 14, 2024	May 5, 2025	Netflix	Universal Television	Lemon Sky Studios
59	Bearbrick	Meghan McCarthy	March 21, 2025		Apple TV+	Dentsu Entertainment	CGCG
60	The Bad Guys: The Series	Ben Glass; Katherine Nolfi	November 6, 2025	April 2, 2026	Netflix	—N/a	88 Pictures; Dave Enterprises
61	Doozie's Doghouse	Traci Paige Johnson; Jennifer Twomey	November 9, 2026	present	Netflix	—N/a	Technicolor Animation Productions; Doberman Pictures; Dave Enterprises; One-Take Floyd; CGCG

=== Upcoming ===
==== In development ====
Title	Creator(s) / Developer(s)	Network	Co-production with	Ref(s)
Untitled Casper series (Note: Live-action production.)	Rob Letterman; Hilary Winston	Disney+	Universal Global Television; DreamWorks Classics; Amblin Television	
Felix the Cat	TBA	TBA	WildBrain Studios	
The Gumazing Gum Girl!	TBA	TBA	CRE84U Entertainment	
She-Ra	TBA	Amazon Prime Video	Mattel Studios; Amazon MGM Studios	
Untitled Tony Hale series	Tony Hale	TBA	—N/a	

== Films ==
Title	Release date	Director(s)	Writer(s)	Composer(s)	Co-production with	Production services	Network
Trollhunters: Rise of the Titans	July 21, 2021	Johane Matte; Francisco Ruiz Velasco; Andrew Schmidt	Based on the characters by: Guillermo del Toro; Daniel Kraus	Jeff Danna	Double Dare You Productions	88 Pictures; CGCG Inc. Original Force	Netflix
Trollhunters: Rise of the Titans	July 21, 2021	Johane Matte; Francisco Ruiz Velasco; Andrew Schmidt	Guillermo del Toro; Marc Guggenheim; Dan Hageman; Kevin Hageman	Jeff Danna	Double Dare You Productions	88 Pictures; CGCG Inc. Original Force	Netflix
Megamind vs. the Doom Syndicate	March 1, 2024	Eric Fogel	Alan Schoolcraft; Brent Simons	Matthew Janszen; Bryan Winslow	—N/a	88 Pictures; Doberman Pictures	Peacock

== Television specials ==
Title	Director(s)	Release date	Network	Co-production with	Production services
Puss in Book: Trapped in an Epic Tale	Roy Burdine; Johnny Castuciano	June 20, 2017	Netflix	—N/a	Bardel Entertainment
Home for the Holidays	Blake Lemons	December 1, 2017	Netflix	—N/a	Titmouse, Inc.
The Spooky Tale of Captain Underpants: Hack-a-Ween	Seung W. Cha; Kevin Peaty	October 8, 2019	Netflix	—N/a	Titmouse, Inc.
Spirit Riding Free: Spirit of Christmas	Allan Jacobsen; Kevin Wotton	December 6, 2019	Netflix	—N/a	Toiion
Captain Underpants: Epic Choice O' Rama	Todd Grimes	February 11, 2020	Netflix	—N/a	Titmouse, Inc.
Dragons: Rescue Riders: Hunt for the Golden Dragon	T.J. Sullivan; Greg Rankin	March 27, 2020	Netflix	—N/a	Bardel Entertainment
Dragons: Rescue Riders: Secrets of the Songwing	T.J. Sullivan; Greg Rankin	July 24, 2020	Netflix	—N/a	Bardel Entertainment
The Boss Baby: Get That Baby	Dan Forgione; Pete Jacobs; Matt Whitlock	September 1, 2020	Netflix	—N/a	—N/a
Madagascar: A Little Wild: A Fang-Tastic Halloween	Erik Kling	October 21, 2020	Peacock; Hulu	—N/a	Mainframe Studios
Dragons: Rescue Riders: Huttsgalor Holiday	T.J. Sullivan; Greg Rankin	November 24, 2020	Netflix	—N/a	Bardel Entertainment
Captain Underpants: Mega Blissmas	Erik Kling; Kevin Peaty	December 4, 2020	Netflix	—N/a	Titmouse, Inc. Stoopid Buddy Studios
Spirit Riding Free: Ride Along Adventure	Beth Sleven; Allan Jacobsen; Kevin Wotton	December 8, 2020	Netflix	—N/a	Toiion
Madagascar: A Little Wild: Holiday Goose Chase	Chad Van De Keere	November 26, 2021	Peacock; Hulu	—N/a	Mainframe Studios
Jurassic World Camp Cretaceous: Hidden Adventure	Leah Artwick; Eric Elrod; Michael Mullen	November 15, 2022	Netflix	Universal Pictures; Amblin Entertainment	CGCG
The Boss Baby Christmas Bonus	Matt Engstrom; Christo Stamboliev	December 6, 2022	Netflix	—N/a	Technicolor Animation Productions
The Bad Guys: A Very Bad Holiday	Bret Haaland	November 30, 2023	Netflix	—N/a	88 Pictures
The Bad Guys: Haunted Heist	Kevin Peaty	October 3, 2024	Netflix	—N/a	88 Pictures

== Short films ==
Title	Director(s)	Release date	Network	Co-production with	Production services	Type Of Short
The Nock and the Treeples (Note: Commission for the Hope Works Project)	—N/a	2018	Youtube; Twitter; Snapchat	—N/a	—N/a	Internet Short

== Notable people ==
- David Soren, director

== See also ==
- List of NBCUniversal television programs
- List of Universal Animation Studios productions
- List of Disney Television Animation productions
- List of Pixar television series
