= Heroes: Saving Charlie =

Book by Aury Wallington

Saving Charlie
- Author: Aury Wallington
- Language: English
- Set in: TV series Heroes
- Publisher: Del Rey Books
- Publication date: December 26, 2007
- Publication place: United States
- Pages: 256
- ISBN: 0345503228

Saving Charlie is a novel written by Aury Wallington and published by Del Rey Books, based on the television series Heroes. It was released in the United States on December 26, 2007. It was made with the full cooperation of the show's creators, although its canonicity about the television series has not yet been established.

== Plot introduction ==
The novel takes place during the first season of Heroes and chronicles the activities of Hiro Nakamura, self proclaimed master of time and space. who begins as a young man with the ability to stop time and experience time travel. He transports himself back in time (as seen in the episode "Six Months Ago") in hopes of saving the life of Charlene "Charlie" Andrews, a waitress with enhanced memory, who Hiro has fallen in love with, but is destined to die at the hands of a super-powered serial killer, Sylar.

== Characters ==
- Hiro Nakamura can stop time and travel through time and space. He has yet to gain control of the latter. He gets sidetracked from his mission to save the world and travels six months back in time to save Charlie.
- Charlene “Charlie” Andrews has an eidetic memory and is a waitress at the Burnt Toast Diner. She plans to one day travel around the world.
- Lloyd is a police officer and a regular at the Burnt Toast Diner. He and Charlie have dated in the past and has feelings for her. He also bullies Hiro.
- Lynette is the manager of the Burnt Toast Diner.
- Bob is the chef at the Burnt Toast Diner.
- Mr. Roitz is the landlord of Hiro's apartment.
- PJ is an employee at a comic bookstore at the mall. Hiro can't talk to Ando without breaking the space-time continuum, he becomes friends with PJ.
- Ando Masahashi is Hiro's best friend who works with him at Yamagato Industries.
- Sylar referred to as The Brain Man: a serial killer who takes people's abilities by cutting their head open.
- Molly Walker makes a minor appearance at the Los Angeles Zoo where Hiro accidentally teleports.
- James Walker is another victim of Sylar. Hiro accidentally teleports to a morgue and sees his body. He is Molly Walker's father.

== Reference Characters ==
These are characters that are talked about at some point in the novel and in flashbacks but do not necessarily appear in the story.

- Kaito Nakamura is Hiro's dad, the focus of many flashbacks. He and Hiro are very different and usually avoid each other but Hiro finds they have more in common than he thinks.
- Kimiko Nakamura is Hiro's sister who also appears in flashbacks.
- Isaac Mendez is the author of the comic book, 9th Wonders! and another of Sylar's victims. Hiro refers to the time when he accidentally teleported to New York City and found his body in his apartment.
- Takezo Kensei is a Bushido samurai warrior from the 17th century whom Hiro refers to many times.
- Robogirl is a character from Hiro's favorite manga series by the same name. She is a female robot with weapons for hands. According to Hiro, she resembles Charlie in a lot of ways.
- Tami Oyoki is referred to as the girl who came close to having a relationship with Hiro in the past. She was Kimiko's best friend and was only nice to Hiro because he was "her friend's geeky little brother".
- Miyuki Akayawa was a girl Hiro had asked out in the past but was rejected.
- Barbie Travis was a waitress at the Burnt Toast diner in 1976. She was murdered by her ex-boyfriend, Merle Eckels. Hiro meets her in person when he accidentally teleports to that time and also witnesses Merle's execution for the murder.
- Aunt Erika is Charlie's aunt whom she is close to. She was Charlie's guardian as she was growing up and has also worked at the Burnt Toast Diner.
