= List of Spirit Riding Free episodes =

The following is a list of episodes from the series Spirit Riding Free, which is a Netflix series based on the movie, Spirit: Stallion of the Cimarron.

== Episodes ==
=== Series overview ===
Series	Episodes	Originally released
1	6	5 May 2017
2	7	8 September 2017
3	7	17 November 2017
4	6	16 March 2018
5	7	11 May 2018
6	6	17 August 2018
7	7	9 November 2018
8	6	5 April 2019
Pony Tales 1	6	9 August 2019
Pony Tales 2	4	18 October 2019
Special		6 December 2019
Riding Academy 1	7	3 April 2020
Riding Academy 2	9	4 September 2020
Interactive Special		8 December 2020

=== Season 1 (2017) ===
No. overall	No. in season	Title	Directed by	Written by	Storyboarded by	Original release date
1	1	"Lucky and the Unbreakable Spirit"	Joshua Taback	Aury Wallington	Stephanie Arnett	May 5, 2017
Lucky, a girl from the city, arrives in the frontier town of Miradero, and tries to fit in, but struggles at doing so. However, she becomes friends with a wild horse, Spirit, after he is wrangled.
2	2	"Lucky and the Treacherous Trail"	Joshua Taback	Aury Wallington	Marc Wasik and Kevin Wotton	May 5, 2017
Lucky convinced one of her new friends, Pru, to tell her how to ride a horse so she, and her horse, Spirit, can participate in an upcoming saddle club ride.
3	3	"Lucky and the Mysterious Map"	Beth Sleven	Aury Wallington	Jean Kang and Christina Manrique	May 5, 2017
On a camping trip with her friends, Lucky attempts to decode an old map once taken by her dad, and works with her friends to find the supposed treasure.
4	4	"Lucky and the Competition Conundrum"	Joshua Taback	Katherine Nolfi	Marc Wasik and Kevin Wotton	May 5, 2017
In an attempt to be appreciated at school, Lucky works with Maricela at a school event, putting her in direct competition with her friends Abigail and Pru.
5	5	"Lucky and the Appaloosa Adventure"	Beth Sleven	Robert Taylor	Jean Kang and Christina Manrique	May 5, 2017
Lucky and Turo, a saddlemaker, work together to save a horse mistreated by a man named Grayson while her dad tries to stop a dam from bursting apart and causing destruction.
6	6	"Lucky and the Not-So-Secret Surprise"	Julia "Fitzy" Fitzmaurice	Nancy Cohen	Kathryn Marusik and David Van Tuyle	May 5, 2017
In an attempt to give Pru a surprise party for her birthday, Lucky asks Abigail to help her, but soon everything goes horribly wrong.

=== Season 2 (2017) ===
No. overall	No. in season	Title	Directed by	Written by	Storyboarded by	Original release date
7	1	"Lucky and the Cowboy Next Door"	Julia "Fitzy" Fitzmaurice	Laura Sreebny	Kathryn Marusik and David Van Tuyle	September 8, 2017
Lucky eagerly accepts lessons from Javier, a new performer skilled in trick riding, in an attempt to follow in the footsteps of her mother.
8	2	"Lucky and the Pie P.I."	Beth Sleven	Robert Taylor	Jean Kang and Christina Manrique	September 8, 2017
When a cherry pie which Abigail made goes missing, Lucky acts as a detective with the help of her friends, taking lessons from her favorite "Boxcar Bonnie" books.
9	3	"Lucky and Her Super Amazing and Fun Cousin Julian"	Beth Sleven	Nancy Cohen	Jean Kang and Christina Manrique	September 8, 2017
Julian, one of Lucky's cousins, comes to town, but Lucky, remembering his past schemes, is concerned that he is only out to swindle more people after her friends are charmed by him.
10	4	"Lucky and the Harvest Hunt"	Joshua Taback	Laura Sreebny	Marc Wasik and Kevin Wotton	September 8, 2017
Still in town, Julian declares, at a local scavenger hunt, that his team of boys will find, and make, a scarecrow, before the team of girls, headed by Lucky, can do so.
11	5	"Lucky and the Christmas Spirit"	Joshua Taback	Katherine Nolfi	Marc Wasik and Kevin Wotton	September 8, 2017
The Christmas celebrations of Miradero seem to be put on hold because of a huge blizzard, but Lucky has the brilliant idea to give gifts to people across the town to keep everyone in the holiday spirit.
12	6	"Lucky and the Deadly Blizzard"	Julia "Fitzy" Fitzmaurice	Aury Wallington	Kathryn Marusik and David Van Tuyle	September 8, 2017
Lucky and an unlikely ally, Maricela, work together to make sure that vital flu medicine, on a train bound for Miradero, makes it to the town and stops the growing epidemic.
13	7	"Lucky and the Price of Freedom"	Julia "Fitzy" Fitzmaurice	Aury Wallington	Christian Lignan and Kathryn Marusik	September 8, 2017
Lucky learns of an upcoming race, and angry that only men can enter, she decides to do so anyway, posing as a man. However, she faces off against Grayson, putting herself, and Spirit, in danger.

=== Season 3 (2017) ===
No. overall	No. in season	Title	Directed by	Written by	Storyboarded by	Original release date
14	1	"Lucky and the Long Way Home"	Julia "Fitzy" Fitzmaurice	Nancy Cohen	Gus Corrales, Liza Epps, Rianna Liu, and Kathryn Marusik	November 17, 2017
Spirit goes on a long trek to get home to his herd and to be near Lucky, at any cost, even if it puts his life on the line.
15	2	"Lucky and the New Governor"	Julia "Fitzy" Fitzmaurice	Lauren Bradley	Kathryn Marusik	November 17, 2017
Lucky hosts a "charm school" for her friends, Abigail and Pru, attempting to teach them ladylike manners for an upcoming ball. But a birth in Spirit's herd from one of the mares threatens to disrupt their "civilized" duty.
16	3	"Lucky and the Risky Rescue"	Beth Sleven	Laura Sreebny	Jean Kang and Christina "Kiki" Manrique	November 17, 2017
After accidentally going on Grayson's land, Lucky and her friends hatch a plan to save a 16-year-old Tuckapaw man, Mixtli, from being sent to his tribe's reservation and bring him back together with his horse.
17	4	"Lucky and the Field Trip Fraud"	Beth Sleven	Candie Kelty Langdale	Jean Kang and Christina "Kiki" Manrique	November 17, 2017
With kids in the schoolhouse declaring she is the "teacher's pet," Lucky attempts to cause trouble at a field trip to show they have the wrong idea.
18	5	"Lucky and the Shaky Day"	Beth Sleven	Katherine Nolfi	Jean Kang and Christina "Kiki" Manrique	November 17, 2017
After the town is damaged by an earthquake, Lucky, Pru, and Abigail discover that a critical bridge for the railroad has been destroyed. They try to warn the train to stop, so that passengers, like Lucky’s her dad, are not killed.
19	6	"Lucky and the Golden Opportunity"	Joshua Taback	Robert Taylor	Mandy Clotworthy and Kevin Wotton	November 17, 2017
Lucky and her friends find what they believe to be an abandoned gold mine. When Abigail accidentally tells Lucky's cousin, Julian, problems ensue.
20	7	"Lucky and the Lion"	Joshua Taback	Aury Wallington	Rianna Liu, Marc Wasik, and Kevin Wotton	November 17, 2017
Lucky, Pru, and Abigail, show Aunt Cora how to ride a horse, so she can impress the Daughters of Miradero. Meanwhile, a mountain lion threatens the herd, putting Spirit in danger.

=== Season 4 (2018) ===
No. overall	No. in season	Title	Directed by	Written by	Storyboarded by	Original release date
21	1	"Lucky and the Impatient Patient"	Joshua Taback	Nancy Cohen and Robert Taylor	Mandy Clotworthy and Kevin Wotton	March 16, 2018
Pushed out of the barn to let Spirit recover by Mr. Granger, Lucky helps Mr. Winthrop by giving people ice cream cones and sundaes. But she runs into trouble when she starts giving people advice, leading her to quickly become overwhelmed.
22	2	"Lucky and the Train Tycoon"	Joshua Taback	Rich Burns	Marc Wasik and Kevin Wotton	March 16, 2018
For her thirteenth birthday, Lucky has a O-Mok-See planned, but when her grandpa, James Prescott Sr., comes to Miradero, he has his own plans.
23	3	"Lucky and the Role Reversal"	Beth Sleven	Katherine Nolfi	Jean Kang and Christina "Kiki" Manrique	March 16, 2018
With the departure of Aunt Cora, Lucky and her dad begin to spin out of control, and the house starts becoming a mess. Nothing seems to be going right for them, not even a play at school!
24	4	"Lucky and the Patchwork Plan"	Julia "Fitzy" Fitzmaurice	Laura Sreebny	Liza Epps and Kathryn Marusik	March 16, 2018
While Lucky attempts to keep Aunt Cora in Miradero, going to any level to do so, she loses confidence and decides to accept the inevitable until her friends give her a morale boost.
25	5	"Lucky and Her New Family Part 1"	Julia "Fitzy" Fitzmaurice	Aury Wallington	Liza Epps and Kathryn Marusik	March 16, 2018
When a traveling circus comes to the town, with Lucky feeling connected to her mom more than she ever has, Miss Flores feels like she isn't wanted. In the meantime, another horse in the herd tries to fight Spirit and gain control over the herd.
26	6	"Lucky and Her New Family Part 2"	Beth Sleven	Aury Wallington	Jean Kang and Christina "Kiki" Manrique	March 16, 2018
Lucky agrees to fill in when another circus performer is hurt and do some of her mom's old tricks. But, she is disappointed and angry when she believes that her dad is putting Miss Flores ahead of her.

=== Season 5 (2018) ===
No. overall	No. in season	Title	Directed by	Written by	Storyboarded by	Original release date
27	1	"Lucky and La Voltereta Feroz"	Joshua Taback	Laura Sreebny	Marc Wasik and Kevin Wotton	May 11, 2018
Lucky struggles to find her footing at the circus, feeling she doesn't belong until her friends Pru and Abigail arrive, agreeing to stay with her.
28	2	"Lucky and the No-Good Outlaw Butch LePray"	Joshua Taback	Robert Taylor	Marc Wasik and Kevin Wotton	May 11, 2018
Lucky attempts to protect her new family of circus performers from a bandit, while Pru unintentionally conquers her fear of the stage.
29	3	"Lucky and the Big Goodbye"	Beth Sleven	Katherine Nolfi	Jean Kang and Kimberly Jo Mills	May 11, 2018
The circus troupe come upon a town hostile toward circus folk and are told to leave. Lucky and her friends, however, plan a secret show for the children who can't see their show. Lucky has to decide for herself, if she will stay with the troupe, or if she will return home to Miradero.
30	4	"Lucky and the Two-Wheeled Terror"	Julia "Fitzy" Fitzmaurice	Rich Burns	Liza Epps and Kathryn Marusik	May 11, 2018
Lucky begins to re-adjust to her home in Miradero and tries to be nicer to Miss Flores, as she begins teaching her how to ride a horse. Lucky and her friends are surprised by new changes in town, with Lucky trying to pass this off like nothing has changed, even as she get more anxious with the new changes.
31	5	"Lucky and the Rough Ride"	Julia "Fitzy" Fitzmaurice	Laura Sreebny	Liza Epps and Kathryn Marusik	May 11, 2018
Mrs. Granger is invited to class by Miss Flores to teach the students about what to do when accidents happen. Later, the PALs excitedly join Mr. Granger on a mustang drive, and when Lucky sees that the Javier is coming along, she gets even more excited.
32	6	"Lucky and the Ghostly Gotcha!"	Joshua Taback	Aury Wallington	Marc Wasik and Kevin Wotton	May 11, 2018
After Aunt Cora tells Lucky she is too old to do Halloween, with the moms of Pru and Abigail saying the same, they decide to do something more fun than trick-or-treating: re-enact the legend of Sadie Cruthers.
33	7	"Lucky and the Doomed Delivery"	Julia "Fitzy" Fitzmaurice	Katherine Nolfi	Marc Wasik and Kevin Wotton	May 11, 2018
The PALs go on their own camping trip, with Abigail telling Lucky about the Frontier Fillies, a group for girl adventurers. The PALs decide to travel to the religious orphanage where Miss Flores grew up, but on the way, something goes horribly wrong.

=== Season 6 (2018) ===
No. overall	No. in season	Title	Directed by	Written by	Storyboarded by	Original release date
34	1	"Lucky and the Doubtful Drought"	Beth Sleven	Rich Burns	Jean Kang and Kimberly Jo Mills	August 17, 2018
When the drought strikes Miradero, all the water dries up, Grayson offers water from his well for the townspeople to use, but makes them pay for it. Lucky, suspicious of him, convinces Pru and Abigail to investigate how, and why, the well on Grayson's ranch is the only one which has water.
35	2	"Lucky and the Arabian Nightmares"	Beth Sleven	Robert Taylor	Kathryn Marusik and Kimberly Jo Mills	August 17, 2018
As the PALs prepare for their slumber party, Mr. Granger shows new Arabian mares brought into the barn. Later, when Pru does more than her regular chores, it gets a bit out of hand.
36	3	"Lucky and the Fearless Fillies"	Joshua Taback	Lauren Bradley	Richard Gaines and Rick Lacy	August 17, 2018
Pru and Lucky are practicing a play about poison ivy for the Frontier Fillies, a group for girl explorers with the help of Abigail, but their preparations are ruined by Snips entering the barn. Can they still become part of explorer group, or will they be unsuccessful?
37	4	"Lucky and the Resolutionary Fever"	Julia "Fitzy" Fitzmaurice	Laura Sreebny	Marc Wasik and Kevin Wotton	August 17, 2018
As the kids in Miss Flores's class read New Years resolutions they made at the beginning of the year, Lucky realizes she didn't do all the resolutions she made at the beginning of the year and vows to complete them before the year is over.
38	5	"Lucky and the Cousin Caper"	Beth Sleven	Rich Burns	Jean Kang and Kimberly Jo Mills	August 17, 2018
Lucky, Miss Flores, and Jim take family photographs together. Later, Lucky is intrigued by telegrams from her cousin, Julian, in Silverlode, surprising Pru, even as Abigail says it would be exciting. Julian has a plan to "rob" Lucky, by planting something valuable. But will it work or will it go horribly wrong?
39	6	"Lucky and the Wayward Wedding"	Joshua Taback	Aury Wallington	Richard Gaines and Rick Lacy	August 17, 2018
Lucky, busy with Kate moving into the house where she lives with her dad, forgets to bring rings to a practice wedding Pru and Abigail are holding in the barn, and Abigail warns Lucky that something will go wrong since she believes in superstitions.

=== Season 7 (2018) ===
No. overall	No. in season	Title	Directed by	Written by	Storyboarded by	Original release date
40	1	"Lucky and the Railroad Ransom"	Allan Jacobsen	Laura Sreebny	Marc Wasik and Kevin Wotton	November 9, 2018
After Butch LePray kidnaps Jim Prescott, Lucky escapes and hatches a plan with Pru and Abigail to save her dad. While Lucky suspects Grayson at first, he later turns out to be an unexpected ally.
41	2	"Lucky and the Flight of the Fancy"	Beth Sleven	Katherine Nolfi	Jean Kang and Kimberly Jo Mills	November 9, 2018
Annoyed with Julian, especially when he gets out of doing chores, she is impressed when she sees his hot air balloon, and the PALs agree to go on a ride. But, everything goes wrong when Julian, Lucky, and Aunt Cora fly into the sky without the tether.
42	3	"Lucky and the Jam Jam"	Greg Rankin and Beth Sleven	Robert Taylor	Jean Kang, Kimberly Jo Mills, and Kennedy Tarrell	November 9, 2018
The PALs prepare April Fools pranks, but Pru and Abigail warn Lucky against pranking Maricela. Even so, Maricela wants to be pranked, surprising Turo, with the PALs confused by her behavior.
43	4	"Lucky and the Escape Artist"	Julia "Fitzy" Fitzmaurice	Katherine Nolfi	Marc Wasik and Kevin Wotton	November 9, 2018
While Lucky is really excited about having a new sister, Aunt Cora, Kate, and Jim are worried, calling her distracted and irresponsible. Lucky later tries to prove she is responsible even if it involves babysitting Snips on the day every year he gets his haircut.
44	5	"Lucky and the Thin Ice"	Joshua Taback	Laura Sreebny	Richard Gaines and Rick Lacy	November 9, 2018
Its winter in Miradero and the PALs are sled riding on the snow. They find wagon tracks and go to investigate, finding a crashed cart, a horse, and a man, who they bring back to the town, but it turns into a situation that is more than they bargained for.
45	6	"Lucky and the Ray of Sunshine"	Joshua Taback	Aury Wallington	Richard Gaines and Rick Lacy	November 9, 2018
The PALs are riding through town and they are intrigued by the gramophone at the Mr. Wintrop's general store. While Abigail laments they can't get the money to buy it, Pru floats the idea of them getting part-time jobs to pay for it, which Lucky enthusiastically accepts. But, after they accidentally break Grayson's window after they try to return his watch, they have to work at his ranch to pay him back, but Abigail attempts to become Grayson's friend to the chagrin of Lucky and Pru.
46	7	"Lucky and the Double-Dad Dare"	Allan Jacobsen	Katherine Nolfi	Mark Sonntag and Kevin Wotton	November 9, 2018
Pru and Lucky are excited about becoming Frontier Fillies, but Abigail tells them they need to earn 12 badges to become full-fledged Fillies and move on from being Clippitty-Cloppers. Lucky proposes they do the Clippity-Cloppers Wilderness course so they can earn enough badges and become Fillies. They are surprised when they find Mr. Granger and Jim in the barn, who both agree to help them.

=== Season 8 (2019) ===
No. overall	No. in season	Title	Directed by	Written by	Storyboarded by	Original release date
47	1	"Lucky and the Warm Welcome"	Joshua Taback	Rich Burns	Richard Gaines and Rick Lacy	April 5, 2019
Lucky travels on a train with her dad and pregnant mom from Miradero to Cedar Gulch, a railroad outpost, with her dad overseeing the railroad's progress. After spending some time with her mom and dad, Lucky goes out riding, exploring the frontier, and attempts to save a pack of wild horses. Can she do so, or will she be caught up in the flames?
48	2	"Lucky and the Dressage Sabotage"	Greg Rankin and Beth Sleven	Lauren Bradley	Jean Kang, Kimberly Jo Mills, and Kennedy Tarrell	April 5, 2019
Pru, Abigail, and Lucky go to the Farmbrook Arena, the home of the Buffalo Hills Riding Competition, a horse show. Pru is excited to do some freestyle dressage for the first time, but when Rose Pendleton and her posse doubt Pru's abilities to win, Lucky comes to Pru's defense. Later, Lucky tries to make Pru feel better and thinks that Rose is trying to intimidate Pru in an attempt to get to drop out of the competition.
49	3	"Lucky and the Girl Who Cried Wolf"	Allan Jacobsen	Aury Wallington	Mark Sonntag and Kevin Wotton	April 5, 2019
Lucky, Jim, and Kate return home with Polly, with Lucky happily telling her new baby sister she'll be living with them. Next, it cuts to Jim and Kate exhausted by caring for Polly, with Lucky helping them out. Seeing how her parents look, Lucky poses the idea of babysitting her young sister, and Jim accepts this, conditioned on Kate's approval.
50	4	"Lucky and the Endless Possibilities"	Beth Sleven	Laura Sreebny	Jean Kang, Kimberly Jo Mills, and Kennedy Tarrell	April 5, 2019
Lucky, Abigail, and Pru ride to the schoolhouse and are surprised to see Aunt Cora as the substitute teacher. Lucky isn't sure about this and Aunt Cora says it will be ok, but it ends up being utter pandemonium. Later, while Pru and Abigail are content with having someone to choose for career day, Lucky is unsure which one to choose, either a charra, astronomer, or something new entirely. As a result, Lucky tries to balance all her interests and find out what job would be right for her.
51	5	"Lucky and the New Frontier Part 1"	Jim Schumann	Aury Wallington	Richard Gaines and Rick Lacy	April 5, 2019
The PALs go to a big interview in the city, as does Maricela and Aunt Cora, which will determine whether they get into Tides Run Academy or not. But later, Lucky accidentally creates a bad first impression with Madame Gummery, head of the academy, causing her to get nervous. Can she repair the damage she has done, or will it be permanent?
52	6	"Lucky and the New Frontier Part 2"	Allan Jacobsen	Aury Wallington	Mark Sonntag and Kevin Wotton	April 5, 2019
Lucky, Pru, and Abigail go through the city, searching for Spirit, who is disoriented. They find Spirit, but Lucky is worried about him and if he will go with her to the academy, or not. But, what will Spirit decide...will he go with her...or go on his own?

=== Pony Tales: Season 1 (2019) ===
No. overall	No. in season	Title	Directed by	Written by	Original release date
1	1	"Unstoppable"	Beth Sleven	Nicole Belisle	August 9, 2019
Lucky sings a song "Unstoppable" alongside Pru and Abigail in a music video.
2	2	"Happy Birthday, Spirit"	Beth Sleven	Nicole Belisle	August 9, 2019
The PALs are filling out forms for a summer jubilee, with Pru annoyed by the paperwork, Lucky unsure of when Spirit's birthday is, and Abigail not knowing her address. Jim later tells Lucky about a secret apple orchard in an attempt to make Spirit happy.
3	3	"Tea for Twins"	Beth Sleven	Nicole Belisle	August 9, 2019
The PALs find out that Snips traded their camping equipment for a lollipop, to the twins, Mary Pat and Bianca.
4	4	"The Campsite"	Beth Sleven	Nicole Belisle	August 9, 2019
The PALs devise a plan to get their camping equipment back, with Abigail and Pru each proposing their own plans.
5	5	"Maricela Sitting Free"	Beth Sleven	Nicole Belisle	August 9, 2019
When the PALs find out that Maricela purchased the last tent, they are not thrilled. They agree, begrudgingly, to help Maricela learn how to ride a horse and be in the Frontier Fillies.
6	6	"Young & Free"	Beth Sleven	Nicole Belisle	August 9, 2019
Lucky goes riding across the frontier on Spirit in a music video for the song "Young & Free," where she is joined by Pru and Abigail on their respective horses.

=== Pony Tales: Season 2 (2019) ===
No. overall	No. in season	Title	Directed by	Written by	Original release date
7	1	"The Frontier Fillies Summer Outdoor Jubilee"	Allan Jacobsen	Johanna Stein	October 18, 2019
The PALs prepare themselves for the talent show at the Jubilee. They meet another group of other girls, known as the BUDs, who introduced themselves and help acclimate them to the outdoor jubilee camp.
8	2	"The Frontier Fillies Great Legacy Race"	Kevin Wotton	May Chan	October 18, 2019
The BUDs begin their plan to sabotage the PALs. Lucky is suspicious, knowing she heard something in the night, and while Pru and Abigail aren't sure at first, they realize she is right. They later join the race, even though they have been sabotaged with cooking grease in their boots.
9	3	"The Healing Tree"	Beth Sleven	Lauren Bradley	October 18, 2019
On the ride back to Miradero, the PALs get lost and use the skills they learned at the jubilee to try and get back. They get help from Mixtli when Boomerang is bitten by a snake.
10	4	"The Mystery of the Golden Unicorn"	Allan Jacobsen	Nicole Belisle	October 18, 2019
The PALs have done extensive research of riding academies and send a letter to the one that suits them. Meanwhile, Maricela gets a new poodle and the PALs are entranced by a horse with a golden color.

=== Special (2019) ===
Title	Directed by	Written by	Original release date
"Spirit Riding Free: Spirit of Christmas"	Allan Jacobsen and Kevin Wotton	May Chan	December 6, 2019

=== Riding Academy: Season 1 (2020) ===
No. overall	No. in season	Title	Directed by	Written by	Original release date
1	1	"Home Is Where the Herd Is"	Kevin Wotton	Johanna Stein	April 3, 2020
The PALs chase down Governor on their horses and save him from falling down a ledge, and deal with him being more mischievous than usual. Later, Jim tells Mr. Granger and the PALs that a mountain lion has been spotted again, and the girls first recruit Snips to help break in Governor.
2	2	"Festival of Festivals"	Beth Sleven	Lauren Bradley	April 3, 2020
Jim, Kate, Aunt Cora, and Lucky play with Polly, and Lucky receives a letter from Palomino Bluffs Riding Academy, which informs her she got into the academy, causing her to be jubilant. She encounters Pru and Abigail who are also excited they got into the academy. Later, Abigail tries to teach Snips to read and write, while Lucky plans a huge festival as something for Pru and Abigail, so they don't feel like they are missing out on something, a festival which keeps getting more complex as she gathers supplies across the town.
3	3	"Palomino Bluffs Riding Academy"	Beth Sleven	Nicole Belisle	April 3, 2020
The PALS ride to Palomino Bluffs Riding Academy and they meet the headmaster. They go to their dorms and Lucky learns she has been the talk of the school for weeks, called the "Girl With the Wild Horse." Later, they visit their dorm room, with Abigail and Lucky thinking of ways to make a good first impression, while Pru tries to figure out the most efficient route to go to her classes and impress the headmaster.
4	4	"The Neighs Have It"	Kevin Wotton	Johanna Stein	April 3, 2020
The PALs prepare themselves for class the following day, and are making more friends at the academy until the BUDs make a reappearance. They agreed to stay out of each other's way. Abigail volunteers to be a stable-wrangler volunteer, and when Headmaster Perkins says that a representative for Canter House needs to be elected, Bebe and Alex Fox. Later, Alex gives Lucky an idea: that she should run the election against Bebe. However, the race turns out to not be what Lucky, not Bebe expected, as Alex has one trick up his sleeve to try and win.
5	5	"A Rider's Balance"	Beth Sleven	Claire Epstein	April 3, 2020
Pru practices for a dressage and is cheered on by Lucky and Abigail. Later, Pru is impressed by Priya and Sahir Kapoor who are some of the best dressage riders. When Lucky declares she will plan a social event at the Canter House, Pru and Abigail are worried. Pru worries about her ability at dressage when she can't make a high jump like Priya and Sahir, and the amount of training she is doing makes Lucky and Abigail very concerned.
6	6	"Welcome Back Otter"	Jack Kasprzak	Lauren Bradley	April 3, 2020
The PALs walk across the Palomino Bluffs Riding Academy campus to their first class with Dr. Cope, the on-site veterinarian, following her, as does the rest of the class, to the beach, where they look at tide pools. When Abigail meets an otter, Dr. Cope warns her to not let the animal establish contact with humans and wants to have the animal sent to the zoo, with Abigail growing concerned. Meanwhile, Lucky tries to take an official PALs photo for her memory book.
7	7	"The Palomino Family Affair"	Allan Jacobsen	Jessie Gant	April 3, 2020
As Lucky prepares for her dad's arrival at school and Pru complains about one of the photos, Bebe says that the room has to be very clean, and Abigail tells them about her hard wrangler shift. The PALs are uneasy when Maricela and her horse come to campus for family weekend, when all the families of the students come to visit. When it turns out that Lucky's dad is old friends with Bebe's dad, they have to pretend to best friends.

=== Riding Academy: Season 2 (2020) ===
No. overall	No. in season	Title	Directed by	Written by	Original release date
8	1	"Back to the Starting Line"	Kevin Wotton	Johanna Stein	September 4, 2020
Lucky and Maricela observe the budding romance between Spirit and Mystery early in the morning, with Pru and Abigail going their separate ways. While Maricela wants to spend the "day with family," Lucky leaves to go to her first day of racing practice. When Lucky comes late, the instructor is not impressed and she tries to do what she can to get in her good graces, despite Jack's recommendation of her.
9	2	"The S. S. Friend-ship"	Allan Jacobsen	Johanna Stein	September 4, 2020
As Maricela adjusts to her life at Palamino Bluffs, she is encouraged by Pru, Abigail, and Lucky to make friends, after they are annoyed by her antics, following a visit to a foghorn house. She later starts to become friends with Sahir, Priya, and Alex, forming what she calls the "Poshy Posse"
10	3	"The Gavel of Justice"	Beth Sleven	Laura Sreebny	September 4, 2020
Abigail realizes something, with Pru and Lucky surprised. One day earlier, Bebe, at a meeting of the foals, celebrates her first year as their representative, and asks for ideas for an upcoming dance. Alex threatens to throw her gavel in the ocean. Later, Bebe finds her gavel missing, and discovers it somewhere near a smashed window, with Alex blamed for this happening. But, did he actually do it?
11	4	"The Rival Racer"	Kevin Wotton	Lauren Bradley	September 4, 2020
Lucky confides in Jack that she is nervous about getting a ranking position, the anchor, on the school's horse racing team. Lucky comes across Charles, the project for Ranch Management class that Pru and Abigail are trying to take care of. After Jack encourages Lucky, she believes she will get the ranking position, but a student named Eleanor Kimble moves to the position instead, annoying her. How will Lucky deal with this dilemma?
12	5	"Palentine's Day"	Beth Sleven	Nicole Belisle	September 4, 2020
Maricela is brushing the mane of Mystery, and she tells the PALs that a lady should always have a proper date to dances. So, they decide to go together and without dates. Maricela tells them she sent a formal invitation to Turo for the dance. Later, Abigail and Lucky are concerned when Pru seems stressed after talking to Priya and Sahir, but are excited when she tells them she has a crush on Sahir, telling them to keep it a secret. When the PALs learn about the legend of Los Amores Muertos from Lyds, they are surprised and tell her they will be on the lookout for it. Abigail and Lucky try to do what they can to get Sahir and Pru to admit their feelings for each other.
13	6	"Grandpa's Treasures"	Allan Jacobsen	Lauren Bradley	September 4, 2020
The PALs travel back to Miradero due to the death of Lucky's grandfather, with Pru and Abigail unsure what to tell her. Lucky complains that the funeral of her grandfather felt impersonal. Later, Pru and Abigail talk to each about how it is hard for Lucky, with Abigail appreciating everything around her. Kate tells Lucky they are there for her, telling her she doesn't have to prove anything to anyone.
14	7	"There Will Be Mud"	Kevin Wotton	Nicole Belisle	September 4, 2020
The PALs are riding on the beach near the riding academy, enjoying their last day as foals. Headmaster Perkins, at a school assembly, tells the students of the news: the school has formed a partnership with Barrel Gold Oil and Drilling Company, to drill for oil in Palomino Bluffs, which is rich in oil deposits. Mr. Daniels of the company says they will share profits with the school, while the headmaster hypes up possible school improvements. Lyds Sterling is skeptical, asks if the company has researched the effects of the oil drilling in the area, and Mr. Daniels defends the company's actions.
15	8	"Race to the Finish Part 1"	Beth Sleven	May Chan and Lauren Bradley	September 4, 2020
The PALs have returned to Miradero, with Abigail and Lucky telling Pru that she needs to tell her parents she wants to be a dressage champion rather than helping at the Ramada. Later, the PALs, Jim and Cora, travel to the childhood home, as part of their summer adventures.
16	9	"Race to the Finish Part 2"	Kevin Wotton	May Chan and Lauren Bradley	September 4, 2020
Lucky is told by Jim that he, Cora, and Kate decided to sell the house, but Lucky says the house can still be fixed and repaired, and isn't a lost cause. Pru and Abigail see an upside to the house being sold, saying they can now do fun stuff together, but Lucky believes that her grandfather left her the house so she can do something with it.

=== Interactive special (2020) ===
Title	Directed by	Written by	Storyboard by	Original release date
"Spirit Riding Free: Ride Along Adventure"	Beth Sleven, Allan Jacobsen and Kevin Wotton	Lauren Bradley, Nicole Belisle and May Chan	Fernadmo Corrales, Shawna Cha, Kat Chan, Abigail Davies, Brian Hatfield, Andries Maritz, Ivaylo Ivantchev, and Mark Sonntag	December 8, 2020

The special was removed from Netflix on December 1, 2024.

== Webisodes (2017–20) ==
A number of webisodes have been released exclusively (except for "Unstoppable Music Video") on the DreamWorks Spirit YouTube channel during the course of the series.

No.	Title	Directed by	Written by	Storyboarded by	Original release date
1	"Magic Show"	Jim Schumann	Robert Taylor	Rick Lacy	August 22, 2017
2	"Rainy Day"	Jim Schumann	Robert Taylor	Kennedy Tarrell	November 7, 2017
3	"Mustang Mail Part 1"	Jim Schumann	Robert Taylor	Rick Lacy	January 16, 2018
4	"Mustang Mail Part 2"	Jim Schumann	Robert Taylor	Rick Lacy	January 23, 2018
5	"The Circus Mystery, Pt. 1: Magical New Tricks"	Joshua Taback	Robert Taylor	Jean Kang	July 24, 2018
6	"The Circus Mystery, Pt. 2: Kidnapping in Miradero"	Joshua Taback	Robert Taylor	Jean Kang	July 31, 2018
7	"The Circus Mystery, Pt. 3: The Bandit Standoff"	Joshua Taback	Robert Taylor	Jean Kang	August 7, 2018
8	"Adventure Music Video"	-	-	-	September 23, 2018
9	"Joy to the World (Christmas Music Video)"	-	-	-	December 11, 2018
10	"The Grooming Wagon, Pt. 1: Horse Cleaning Calamity"	-	-	-	January 15, 2019
11	"The Grooming Wagon, Pt. 2: Race Against the Clock"	-	-	-	January 22, 2019
12	"The Grooming Wagon, Pt. 3: A Soapy Success"	-	-	-	January 29, 2019
13	"Fast Friends: Abigail & Boomerang Meet for the FIRST Time!"	-	-	-	July 16, 2019
14	"Fast Friends: Pru & Chica Linda Meet for the FIRST Time!"	-	-	-	July 23, 2019
15	"Fast Friends: Lucky & Spirit Meet for the FIRST Time!"	-	-	-	July 30, 2019
16	"Unstoppable Music Video"	-	-	-	August 6, 2019
17	"A Friendly Race"	Allan Jacobsen	Nicole Belisle	Kat Chan, Laur Uy	June 17, 2020
18	"The Vet Is In"	Allan Jacobsen	Nicole Belisle	Kat Chan, Laur Uy	June 24, 2020
19	"Dressage Corsage"	Allan Jacobsen	Nicole Belisle	Kat Chan, Laur Uy	July 1, 2020
