= Spirit Riding Free =

American animated television series

- Genre: Adventure
- Based on: Spirit: Stallion of the Cimarron by John Fusco
- Developed by: Aury Wallington
- Voices of: Amber Frank; Sydney Park; Bailey Gambertoglio; Darcy Rose Byrnes; Nolan North; Kari Wahlgren
- Theme music composer: Kari Kimmel
- Opening theme: "Riding Free" by Maisy Stella
- Ending theme: "Riding Free" (instrumental)
- Composers: Joachim Horsley; James Allen Roberson
- Country of origin: United States
- Original language: English
- No. of seasons: 8
- No. of episodes: 52 (list of episodes)

Production
- Executive producer: Aury Wallington
- Running time: 23 minutes
- Production company: DreamWorks Animation Television

Original release
- Network: Netflix
- Release: May 5, 2017 – December 8, 2020

Spirit Riding Free is an American animated television series, produced by DreamWorks Animation Television and distributed by Netflix, based on the 2002 Oscar-nominated traditionally animated film, Spirit: Stallion of the Cimarron, and the first series in the Spirit franchise. The series was first released on Netflix on May 5, 2017.

A feature film based on the series, titled Spirit Untamed, was released on June 4, 2021.

== Premise ==
Set in the small frontier town of Miradero during the early 1900s, a 12-year-old girl named Fortuna "Lucky" Esperanza Navarro Prescott, who had recently relocated from the city, encounters a wild kiger mustang named Spirit Jr. (the son of Spirit and Rain from the 2002 movie Spirit: Stallion of the Cimarron). When Lucky is on the train travelling to Miradero, the horse is caught by wranglers and brought to Miradero to be "broken in". Lucky immediately bonds with the stallion and frees him from his pen. Lucky also makes friends with Prudence "Pru" Granger and Abigail Stone. Pru owns a talented and proud palomino horse called Chica Linda, and Abigail owns a friendly and goofy pinto horse called Boomerang. The three girls call themselves the PALs and go on many adventures with their horses.

== Cast ==
- Amber Frank as Fortuna "Lucky" Esperanza Navarro-Prescott, the main protagonist, who is half-European and half-Mexican, and is the leader amongst her friends. She is a very brave, kind, stubborn and headstrong girl who dislikes rules.
- Andy Aragon as Javier. He's a Mexican cowboy and a skilled trick rider. His native language is Spanish. He is also Lucky's crush and later boyfriend.
- Sydney Park as Prudence "Pru" Granger, the brains of the team who knows something about everything. She is of pure African-American heritage.
- Bailey Gambertoglio as Abigail Stone, the youngest and smallest of the girls. She is the least rebellious amongst her peers, and a bit naive, though she is also the kindest, sweetest and funniest. However, she is still smart in her own way, and is courageous like the rest of her friends.
- Darcy Rose Byrnes as Maricela Gutierrez. She is the spoiled daughter of the mayor of Miradero. Initially an adversary of Lucky and the others, she eventually becomes their acquaintance.
- Victor Garber as James Prescott Sr. (1st Voice)
- Nolan North as James "Jim" Prescott Jr. and Jim's father James Prescott Sr. (2nd Voice)
- Kari Wahlgren as Lucky's aunt Cora Prescott and Lucky's younger sister Polly Prescott.
- Duncan Joiner as Snips, Abigail's little brother.
- Jeff Bennett as Mesteneros/Various
- Andy Pessoa as Turo. The teenage craftsman of Miradero who is the largest student in his class and is extremely friendly.
- Tiya Sircar as Kathryn "Kate" Flores-Prescott. The schoolmarm of Miradero who later becomes Lucky's stepmother and Polly's mother made her resign from her job as a teacher.
- Jonathan Craig Williams as Al Granger
- Dawnn Lewis as Fannie Granger
- Lucas Grabeel as Julian Prescott. Lucky's charismatic cousin who tries to collect big bucks with his schemes and lies his way out whenever he gets into trouble.
- Bridger Zadina as Mixtli. A Native American who healed Spirit from his cactus injuries which made him an ally of the PALs.
- Eric Lopez as Fito
- Marite Mantilla as Estrella
- Lilimar Hernandez as Solana
- Tony Hale as Bellhop
- Carlos Alazraqui as Pablo and Rusty
- Julie Brown as Mrs. Hungerford
- James Patrick Stuart as Harlan Grayson
- Katey Sagal as Jane "Butch" LePray
- Thomas Lennon as Rooster
- Rhys Darby as Headmaster Perkins
- Paul-Mikél Williams as Jack
- Rob Riggle as Major Schumann
- Jane Lynch as Coach Bradley
- Anna Vocino as Althea (5 episodes)

== Production ==
The first season premiered on May 5, 2017. The eighth and final season premiered on April 5, 2019.

=== Crew ===
The voice director for the first three episodes was Ginny McSwain. Katie McWane took over as voice director after that.

== Episodes ==
Series	Episodes	Originally released
1	6	5 May 2017
2	7	8 September 2017
3	7	17 November 2017
4	6	16 March 2018
5	7	11 May 2018
6	6	17 August 2018
7	7	9 November 2018
8	6	5 April 2019
Pony Tales 1	6	9 August 2019
Pony Tales 2	4	18 October 2019
Special		6 December 2019
Riding Academy 1	7	3 April 2020
Riding Academy 2	9	4 September 2020
Interactive Special		8 December 2020

== Home media ==
Spirit Riding Free: Season 1–4, containing all of the episodes from seasons 1–4, was released on DVD on June 5, 2018, by Universal Pictures Home Entertainment and grossed $668,194. On September 24, 2019, Universal released Spirit Riding Free: Season 5–8, containing all of the episodes from seasons 5–8 on DVD. The series is also scheduled for DVD releases in the UK, France, Italy, and Germany. Spirit Riding Free: Spirit Of Christmas was released on DVD on November 11, 2021, and grossed $27,614 in home video sales.

== Film adaptation and web series ==
On October 7, 2019, DreamWorks Animation announced that a feature film based on the series was in development scheduled for a theatrical release on May 14, 2021. It was produced by DreamWorks Animation and released by Universal Pictures. The film was directed by Elaine Bogan and co-directed by Ennio Torresan Jr. in their feature directorial debuts, and written by the developer of the series, Aury Wallington, and produced by Karen Foster. The film was produced on a lower budget and made by a different animation studio outside of their Glendale studio, similar to Captain Underpants: The First Epic Movie in 2017. On November 10, 2020, the film's title was announced as Spirit Untamed, with a new release date of June 4, 2021.

=== Spirit & Friends (2022–2023) ===
On February 9, 2022, DreamWorks announced a new series Spirit & Friends inspired by the characters from Spirit Riding Free, which takes place in the setting of Spirit Untamed and release has begun on YouTube on February 12.

== Video game ==
On December 4, 2019, DreamWorks Animation released a game for Android and iOS based around the series entitled Spirit Trick Challenge.

== Music ==
Title	U.S. release date	Length	Label
"Riding Free"	May 25, 2017	3:07	Back Lot Music
"Friends Forever"	November 7, 2017	1:56	Back Lot Music
"Unstoppable"	May 3, 2019	2:40	Back Lot Music
"Spirit Riding Free: Spirit of Christmas - EP"	December 6, 2019	10:42	Back Lot Music

== Reception ==
The series was received positively. Emily Ashby of Common Sense Media described the series as "sweet," arguing that the series treads lightly on "factual strife between new settlers and the indigenous population," and said the series "raises issues, such as migration and assimilation" while saying that Lucky was a heroine who showed "courage, selflessness, and a tireless sense of adventure." Ashby further argued that the series has stories that are "humorous and heartwarming" and themes which reflect the "changing atmosphere of the 19th century American West." Dave Trumbore of Collider, said that the series is less about social commentary and more about a girl, her horse, and "real, complicated friendships and life lessons learned in a refreshingly sincere manner." Ashby also called the "Riding Academy" seasons of the series "geared toward tweens" and praised the series for having a "diverse group of characters," female characters who are self-confident, and characters "coping with challenges of growing up." She also noted these seasons show "healthy self-awareness and emotional maturity for tween viewers," argued that unlike the "Spirit Riding Free" seasons doesn't "touch on themes of the historical time." Ashby also reviewed "Spirit Riding Free: Spirit of Christmas" and "Spirit Riding Free: Ride Along Adventure" specials. The first special she called a "so-so holiday horse tale warms with timely themes" and criticized for "relegating the animals to mere afterthoughts," while calling it emotionally-laden and having themes perfect for a focus on Christmas. The second special she was more critical of, saying its "lengthy story tangents" result in a "laborious interactive story," called it an "exercise in guessing which choice might lead to the exit most quickly," but noted that this involves much "realistic" peril for the young protagonists.

Other reviewers gave a mixed reception. Mandie Caroll, also of Common Sense Media, called the two "Pony Tales" seasons "fun" and noted that while the series does not substantially confront "the actual history of westward settlement," it does focus on cheating, conflicts within friendships, and doing what's right, while criticizing these collections as somewhat disorganized. In contrast, Dave Trumbore of Collider argued that the series tames the message from the 2002 film, noted that in the early seasons of the series mainly focus on the "class divide," offering a sense of adventure rather than social commentary, and noted that while the animation is uneven, it is "an adventurous, kid-friendly series." Armaan Babu of Meaww was more positive, calling the series "one of the most wholesome and inspiring shows on Netflix," arguing that while it is aimed at one young girls, saying it is written well enough to connect with those of all ages, with the protagonists growing "into mature and responsible young adults." Babu also noted that part 2 of the series dealt with heavier topics than part 1, and praised the series for being filled with characters who are "constantly, and genuinely supportive of each other."
