= Spirit Untamed =

2021 film by Elaine Bogan

- Theatrical release poster
- Directed by: Elaine Bogan
- Screenplay by: Aury Wallington; Kristin Hahn
- Based on: Spirit Riding Free by Aury Wallington; Spirit: Stallion of the Cimarron by John Fusco
- Produced by: Karen Foster
- Starring: Isabela Merced; Marsai Martin; Mckenna Grace; Walton Goggins; Andre Braugher; Julianne Moore; Jake Gyllenhaal
- Edited by: R. Orlando Duenas
- Music by: Amie Doherty
- Production company: DreamWorks Animation
- Distributed by: Universal Pictures
- Release date: June 4, 2021
- Running time: 88 minutes
- Country: United States
- Language: English
- Budget: $30 million
- Box office: $42.7 million

Spirit Untamed is a 2021 American animated adventure film directed by Elaine Bogan and written by Aury Wallington and Kristin Hahn. The second theatrical film of the Spirit franchise, it is a soft reboot of Spirit: Stallion of the Cimarron (2002) and is based on characters from the Netflix spin-off series, Spirit Riding Free.

With the voices of Isabela Merced, Jake Gyllenhaal, Marsai Martin, Mckenna Grace, Julianne Moore, Walton Goggins, and Andre Braugher, the film is about a young girl named Fortuna "Lucky" Prescott who moves to the small rural community of Miradero, where she meets the titular wild kiger mustang. As the son of Spirit and Rain from Spirit: Stallion of the Cimarron, she names the horse "Spirit" after his father, and Lucky immediately begins to bond with him. The film was announced to be in development in October 2019, and production was done remotely during the COVID-19 pandemic. The film was dedicated to the memory of Kelly Asbury, the co-director of the original Spirit film, who died on June 26, 2020.

Spirit Untamed was theatrically released in the United States on June 4, 2021, by Universal Pictures. The film received mixed reviews from critics, who deemed the film inferior to the original and unnecessary, though its animation, humor, score and voice acting were praised. It underperformed at the box-office, grossing over $42 million worldwide against a budget of $30 million, making it both DreamWorks Animation's cheapest and lowest-grossing film to date.

== Plot ==
In the early 1900s in the Wild West, Milagro Navarro-Prescott performs her trademark act in the circus until she falls from a horse during one of her performances and dies. Years later, her young and beautiful daughter, Fortuna "Lucky" Esperanza Navarro-Prescott, has been living with her aunt Cora and grandfather James in a city on the East Coast. However, after Lucky lets a flying squirrel in their house and ruins her grandfather's campaign party, she and Cora head to the western town of Miradero, where they will stay with Lucky's father Jim, whom Lucky has not known after the incident with Milagro, for the summer. On the train over, Lucky notices a kiger mustang running with his herd and goes to the back of the train to meet him. Upon arriving in Miradero, the pair meets local young riders Pru Granger (and her father Al), and Abigail Stone (and her brother Snips).

The next day, Lucky goes to a corral where she sees the same horse from before. A man named Hendricks is trying to break the horse and treating it abusively. Lucky tells Jim and Cora about the horse, thinking he can be her new friend, but Jim does not want Lucky to go near the horses after what happened to Milagro. Nonetheless, Pru and Abigail help Lucky win over the trust of the horse, whom she names Spirit (naming him after his father from the original movie). After a while, Spirit trusts Lucky enough to eat an apples she offers him and allows her to pet him, sealing their bond.

Lucky attempts to ride Spirit, but he escapes from the corral and runs away. Lucky is saved by Pru and Abigail after almost falling off a cliff at the canyon, but she falls into the water and dies and is still alive, but wounded. Jim finds and reprimands Lucky for disobeying him and warns her for being killed and hurt as well by Spirit just like Milagro. They go home arguing, making Lucky think he has given up on her as she heard he was sending her back to her grandfather's campaign house in the city with Cora and never return to Miradreo and never see Pru and Abigail again, but Lucky refuses. She sneaks out at night through the forest where she finds Spirit and his herd together, but is interrupted by Hendricks and his men, who capture all the horses but Spirit and take them in with a stolen train. Knowing Hendricks and his men are wranglers, who are taking the horses to a boat to be auctioned and worked to death, Lucky agrees to help Spirit rescue his herd. She enlists Pru and Abigail with their horses to embark on a journey to try and cut the wranglers off on their path by beating them to a water depot located beyond a summit called Heck Mountain. During the trip, Lucky builds up her relationship with Spirit and becomes good friends with Pru and Abigail as they travel.

The girls reach the water depot the night before the wranglers are set to arrive, but Lucky wakes up the next day, realizing the wranglers made it earlier than expected. Spirit desperately attempts to save his herd on his own, but gets taken in by the wranglers. Determined to save Spirit, Lucky and her friends follow the train to the docks, where the wranglers are boarding the horses onto the boat. The girls arrive too late to stop the boat from leaving, but they manage to save Spirit. Lucky and Spirit get on board by leaping off the docks just like Milagro leaping off with her horse, freeing the other horses, and subduing the wranglers, with Spirit knocking Hendricks off the boat. Jim, Cora, and Al show up on a fast steam train and arrest Hendricks and the other wranglers.

On their way back to Miradero, the girls travel to a field in the middle of the wilderness, and Lucky lets Spirit go, saying that he needs to stay with his herd. When she returns home, Lucky and Cora initially plan to return to the city, but after Lucky bonds with Jim at a rodeo, she decides instead to stay in Miradero with him and her friends, as Spirit is seen running through the fields with his herd.

== Voice cast ==
- Isabela Merced as Fortuna "Lucky" Esperanza Navarro-Prescott, Milagro and Jim's daughter, Cora's niece, and Pru and Abigail's friend.
  - Bridget Hoffman voices Baby Lucky
- Marsai Martin as Prudence "Pru" Granger, Lucky's friend and Al's daughter.
- Mckenna Grace as Abigail Stone, Lucky's friend and Snips' sister.
- Walton Goggins as Hendricks, the leader of a gang of horse wranglers.
- Andre Braugher as Al Granger, Pru's father.
- Julianne Moore as Cora Prescott, Lucky's aunt and Jim's older sister.
- Jake Gyllenhaal as James "Jim" Prescott Jr., Lucky's widowed father and Cora's younger brother.
- Eiza González as Milagro Navarro-Prescott, a famous horse rider and Lucky's late mother.
- Lucian Perez as Snips Stone, Abigail's younger brother.
- Joe Hart as James Prescott Sr., Lucky's grandfather
- Alejandra Blengio as Valentina
- Gino Montesinos as Wrangler/Rodeo Cowboy
- Jerry Clarke as Wrangler/Llama Cowboy
- Lew Temple as Wrangler/Conductor
- Gary Anthony Williams as Wrangler
- Renie Rivas as Lady with Dog
- Horse vocals are provided by Gary Hecker

== Production ==
=== Development ===
On October 7, 2019, DreamWorks Animation announced that a spin-off film of Spirit: Stallion of the Cimarron as well as an adaptation of its spin-off TV series Spirit Riding Free was in development, with Elaine Bogan serving as director and Ennio Torresan Jr. serving as co-director from a script by series developer Aury Wallington, and produced by Karen Foster. While Spirit Riding Free explores the characters of Lucky and her friends, Spirit Untamed focuses deeper for Lucky in an emotional take in a standalone film that is not a sequel to the original nor the TV series.

=== Animation and design ===
The film would be produced on a lower budget and be made by a different animation studio outside of DreamWorks' Glendale studio, similar to 2017's Captain Underpants: The First Epic Movie. Following the first trailer, it was confirmed that Jellyfish Pictures, who worked on How to Train Your Dragon: Homecoming, would be providing the animation for the film, making Jellyfish's first animated project for over 300 people working on it. The film uses a style that is a mix of 3D with the look of a handpainted look from Riding Free, taking about 1300 shots, 25 of which were animated by Jellyfish, and used 2D drawings to make 3D maquettes, some of which were supplied by DreamWorks. Additional animation was provided by 88 Pictures from Trollhunters: Rise of the Titans, and model rigging for the characters was provided by Minimo VFX.

Production of the film started in August 2019 and shifted to work remotely during the COVID-19 pandemic.

== Music ==
On May 6, 2021, Amie Doherty, composer for the DreamWorks Animation short film Marooned, was confirmed to be composing the music for the film, replacing Hans Zimmer who composed the score for Spirit: Stallion of the Cimarron. Doherty was the first woman to compose a DreamWorks film. The following day, a single titled "Fearless (Valiente Duet)", written by Doherty and performed by Isabela Merced and Eiza González, was released by Back Lot Music. A second single, titled "You Belong", performed by Becky G, was released on May 21, 2021. A soundtrack of the film was released on May 28, 2021, and additionally, Robin Pecknold of Fleet Foxes is featured on several tracks contributing vocal harmonies along with Eiza González. "Riding Free", the theme song from Spirit Riding Free by Kari Kimmel, is featured in Untamed.

== Release ==
=== Theatrical ===
Spirit Untamed was theatrically released on June 4, 2021, by Universal Pictures. It was previously scheduled for May 14, 2021. The film was released on digital rental on June 24, 2021, on streaming services Apple TV and Amazon Prime Video.

=== Home media ===
Spirit Untamed was released on DVD and Blu-ray on August 31, 2021, by Universal Pictures Home Entertainment through Studio Distribution Services LLC in the United States.

It was then released on DVD and Blu-Ray as a "Special Sleepover Edition" on October 25, 2021, by Warner Bros. Home Entertainment in the United Kingdom which features an hour of special features including "How to" sessions on how to create your own indoor "campfire", how to Ukulele, and how to make smores, meet the cast, drawing Spirit, finding your Spirit, deleted scenes and sing-along videos. It was later released on Hulu on November 3, 2021. The film grossed $2.9 million in home video sales.

== Reception ==
=== Box office ===
Spirit Untamed grossed $17.7 million in the United States and Canada, and $25 million in other territories, for a worldwide total of $42.7 million.

In the United States, Spirit Untamed was released alongside The Conjuring: The Devil Made Me Do It, and was projected to gross around $5 million from 3,200 theaters in its opening weekend. The film made $2.4 million on its first day, and went on to debut to $6.3 million, finishing fourth at the box office. In its sophomore weekend the film dropped 57% to $3.8 million, finishing sixth.

=== Critical response ===
On review aggregator Rotten Tomatoes, the film holds an approval rating of 47% based on 116 reviews, with an average rating of 5.5/10. The website's critics consensus reads: "While it might be a passable diversion for younger viewers, Spirit Untamed is a middling sequel that lacks the essential energy suggested by its title." On Metacritic, the film has a weighted average score of 49 out of 100 based on 23 critics, indicating "mixed or average reviews". Audiences polled by CinemaScore gave the film an average grade of "A" on an A+ to F scale, the same as the 2002 film. PostTrak reported 87% of audience members gave it a positive score, with 66% saying they would definitely recommend it.

Lovia Gyarke of The Hollywood Reporter praised the film for its animation, writing "Spirit Untamed is beautiful to look at and occasionally genuinely funny. The stunning and detailed animations saturate Lucky's world with an impressive array of colors, from the crimson apples she feeds Spirit to the pistachio and emerald-green leaves on the swaying trees". However, in criticizing the character of Spirit, she noted that Spirit "is more one-dimensional here; he lacks the simultaneous mix of curiosity and complete disdain for humans that made his perspective charming in the first place."

Pete Hammond of Deadline praised the film for its female cast, stating that "After all the decades of boy-driven stories set in the wild West, it is refreshing to see the girls get their turn...And that is exactly what Spirit: Riding Free writer Aury Wallington and Kristin Hahn have in mind, along with their director Elaine Bogan and producer Karen Foster." Additionally, Hammond praised the soundtrack and vocal performances, which he wrote were "perfectly pitched here, a step above the TV show if not quite up to the artistry of the original film."

Peter Debruge of Variety was critical of the film's animation, stating the film "substitutes unappealingly designed, obviously digital characters, who've been badly rigged and stuck in under-detailed environments." He also added that "Spirit still looks like Spirit, but neither the horse nor the girl (who's voiced by live-action Dora actor Isabela Merced) has much of a personality, while the plot is less sophisticated than what audiences might expect from an early-20th-century single-reel silent movie." Beatrice Loayza of The New York Times gave the film a negative review, stating that "This spinoff of Spirit: Stallion of the Cimarron is a bland, bubbly romp through the Wild West, with a heavy dose of girl power."

Jesse Hassenger of The A.V. Club gave the film a C+, stating that "As a Dreamworks production, Spirit Untamed carries inarguable novelty: It's a sweet, simple Western, relaxed about its identity as a girl-centric adventure story, in contrast to bigger DreamWorks cartoons sweaty about their desire to draw eyeballs from Pixar and Minions". He also praised the film for its expansion of the original series, noting that "Spirit Untamed essentially retells, modifies, and expands the events of the show's pilot."

=== Accolades ===
Award	Date of ceremony	Category	Recipient(s)	Result
Heartland Film Festival	2021	Truly Moving Picture Award	—N/a	Won
Hollywood Music in Media Awards	November 17, 2021	Best Original Score - Animated Film	Amie Doherty	Nominated
Hollywood Music in Media Awards	November 17, 2021	Best Original Song - Animated Film	Fearless (Valiente) – Amie Doherty (Isabela Merced and Eiza González)	Nominated
Annie Awards	March 12, 2022	Best Storyboarding	Gary Graham	Nominated
Imagen Awards	October 2, 2022	Best Feature Film	—N/a	Nominated

== In other media ==
=== Video game ===
A video game adaptation, titled Spirit: Lucky's Big Adventure, was released on June 1, 2021, on PC, PlayStation 4, Xbox One and Nintendo Switch. The game was developed by Aheartfulofgames and released by Outright Games.

=== NASCAR Cup Series sponsorship ===
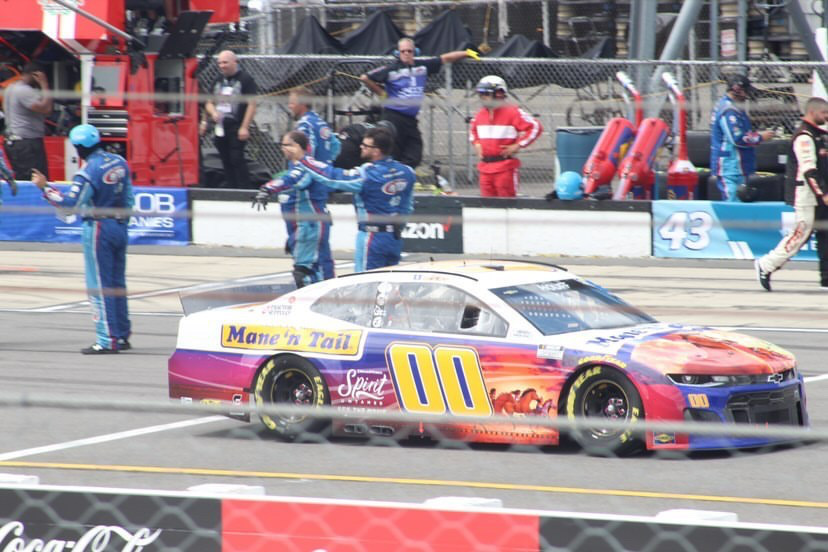
Quin Houff, sponsored by Spirit Untamed and Mane 'n Tail, waiting on pit road.

Spirit Untamed, in partnership with the hair care and horse care company Mane 'n Tail, would sponsor StarCom Racing driver Quin Houff in the NASCAR Cup Series for select races. Throughout the midway point of the 2021 NASCAR Cup Series season, Houff would do numerous events including autograph signings with special Spirit Untamed merchandise being made. As of June 27, 2021, Houff has raced the scheme four times, once at the Circuit of the Americas, once at Nashville Superspeedway, and two during the Pocono Raceway doubleheader. Houff would finish 34th at COTA with a DNF, 38th at Nashville with a DNF, 31st at Pocono-1, on the lead lap, and 33rd at Pocono-2, 5 laps down.

=== Web series ===
On February 9, 2022, DreamWorks announced a new series Spirit & Friends inspired by the characters from Spirit Riding Free, which takes place in the setting of Spirit Untamed and release has begun on YouTube on February 12.

== See also ==
- List of films about horses
