= Amber Frank =

American actress

- Born: Amber Dawn Frank; December 2, 1998 (age 27); Tampa, Florida, U.S.
- Other name: Amber Montana
- Occupation: Actress
- Years active: 2008–present

Amber Dawn Frank (born December 2, 1998), formerly known professionally as Amber Montana, is an American actress. She is known for her role as Taylor Hathaway in the Nickelodeon series The Haunted Hathaways.

== Biography ==
Frank started acting at the age of 7 in Florida before she moved to California, where she got her first minor role in the 2008 drama movie She Could Be You. Later on, she appeared in different TV shows. In 2012, she was cast for the lead role as Taylor in the Nickelodeon sitcom The Haunted Hathaways after she had auditioned eight times for that role. She currently resides in Santa Clarita, California. Frank is of Spanish and Cuban descent.

== Filmography ==
Film
Year	Title	Role	Notes
2008	She Could Be You	Jennifer Marteliz	Credited as Amber Montana
2010	Monster Mutt	School kid	Credited as Amber Montana
2015	Huevos: Little Rooster's Egg-cellent Adventure	Dee (voice)	Credited as Amber Montana
2016	Emma's Chance	Kate Rogers	Credited as Amber Montana
2016	Emma's Chance	Kate Rogers	Direct-to-video
2016	Vanished – Left Behind: Next Generation	Gabby Harlow	
2020	Hubie Halloween	Female Zombie Band Singer	

Television
Year	Title	Role	Notes
2010	I Didn't Know I Was Pregnant	Maggie	1 episode
2011	Man Up!	Samantha	Episode: "Pilot"
2013–2015	The Haunted Hathaways	Taylor Hathaway	Main role
2014	The Thundermans	Taylor Hathaway	Episode: "The Haunted Thundermans"
2017–2020	Spirit Riding Free	Lucky Prescott (voice)	Main role
2018	Party Mom	Ashley	Television film

== Awards and nominations ==
Year	Award	Category	Work	Result	Refs
2014	Imagen Awards	Best Young Actress	The Haunted Hathaways	Nominated	
2015	NAACP Image Awards	Outstanding Performance by a Youth in a Youth/Children's Program – Series or Special	The Haunted Hathaways	Nominated	
