= Amie Doherty =

Irish composer

- Born: Amie Doherty; 30 November 1987 (age 38); Ballinasloe, Ireland
- Genres: Film and television scores, soundtracks, jazz, rock, pop, electronic, ambient
- Occupations: Composer, conductor, orchestrator
- Instruments: Piano
- Years active: 2010–present
- Website: https://www.amiedoherty.com/

Amie Doherty is an Irish composer, conductor, and orchestrator for film and television. She is the first woman to score an animated feature for DreamWorks.

Her most prominent works were for Spirit Untamed (2021), Undone (2019), Here and Now (2018), Love You to Death (2019), The High Note (2020), Battle at Big Rock (2019), Happiest Season (2020), She-Hulk: Attorney at Law (2022), and Blue Eye Samurai (2023).

In addition to her composing work, she has orchestrated and conducted music for numerous TV series including Star Trek: Discovery, Star Trek: Picard, Fargo, The Umbrella Academy, and Altered Carbon; and for musicians including Lady Gaga and 50 Cent.

== Career ==
Before moving to Los Angeles full-time in 2013, Amie lived, worked and studied in London, South Korea, Vietnam, India, and Spain. She graduated magna cum laude from Berklee College of Music's Masters program in Scoring for Film, Television, and Video Games, where she was awarded the Howard Shore Scholarship. She holds a bachelor's degree in music from Trinity College, Dublin.

In 2016, Amie became a Sundance Composer Fellow, having been chosen from over 500 composers to attend the intensive Sundance Institute Music & Sound Design Lab at the legendary Skywalker Ranch. Following her time at the lab, she was announced as the 2016 Sundance Institute/Time Warner Foundation Composer Fellow. In 2013, she received the ASCAP Foundation Harold Arlen Award after being chosen as one of 12 composers worldwide to participate in the ASCAP Television & Film Scoring Workshop.

Her score for Spirit Untamed was nominated for the 2021 International Film Music Critics Association Award for Best Original Score for an Animated Film. The score has received praise from The Film Music Institute: "Soaring voices, boisterous old west orchestrations, ethnic energy, whipping dastardly villains and tips to the Morricone hat make for a mighty impressive first time in the saddle for a female composer at DreamWorks."

Doherty won Best Score for an Animated Short for Marooned at the 2019 Hollywood Music in Media Awards (HMMA).

In 2022 she was nominated for IFMCA (International Music Film Critics Awards) Breakthrough Composer of the Year.

== Works ==
=== Film ===
Year	Title	Director	Studio(s)	Notes
2016	Feast of Varanasi	Rajan Kumar Patel		—N/a
2018	Here and Now	Fabien Constant	Paramount Pictures	—N/a
2019	Love You to Death	Alex Kalymnios	Lifetime Entertainment Services	Television film
2019	Battle at Big Rock	Colin Trevorrow	Universal Pictures; NBCUniversal Television Distribution; Amblin Entertainment	Short film; First composition for Universal Pictures
2019	Marooned	Andrew Erekson	Universal Pictures; DreamWorks Animation	Short film played before Abominable; Second composition for Universal Pictures
2020	The High Note	Nisha Ganatra	Focus Features	—N/a
2020	Happiest Season	Clea DuVall	Hulu (United States); Sony Pictures Releasing (International)	—N/a
2021	Spirit Untamed	Elaine Bogan	Universal Pictures; DreamWorks Animation	First feature film composed for Universal Pictures; Third composition for Universal Pictures; First composition for an animated feature
2023	Please Don't Destroy: The Treasure of Foggy Mountain	Paul Briganti	Universal Pictures; Apatow Productions; Mosaic	—N/a
2025	Freakier Friday	Nisha Ganatra	Walt Disney Pictures	First feature film composed for Walt Disney Pictures

=== Television ===
Year	Title	Creator(s)	Studio(s)	Notes
2019	Undone	Kate Purdy; Raphael Bob-Waksberg	Amazon Studios; The Tornante Company; Boxer vs. Raptor; Submarine Amsterdam; Hive House Project	—N/a
2022	She-Hulk: Attorney at Law	Jessica Gao	Marvel Studios	—N/a
2023	Blue Eye Samurai	Michael Green and Amber Noizumi	Netflix Animation	—N/a
