= Spirit: Stallion of the Cimarron =

2002 animated Western film

- Theatrical release poster
- Directed by: Kelly Asbury; Lorna Cook
- Written by: John Fusco
- Produced by: Mireille Soria; Jeffrey Katzenberg
- Starring: Matt Damon; James Cromwell; Daniel Studi; Chopper Bernet; Jeff LeBeau; John Rubano; Richard McGonagle; Matt Levin; Adam Paul; Robert Cait; Charles Napier; Meredith Wells; Zahn McClarnon; Michael Horse; Donald Fullilove
- Edited by: Nick Fletcher; Clare De Chenu
- Music by: Hans Zimmer
- Production company: DreamWorks Animation
- Distributed by: DreamWorks Pictures (Note: In July 2014, the film's distribution rights were purchased by DreamWorks Animation from Paramount Pictures (owners of the pre-2005 DreamWorks Pictures catalog) and transferred to 20th Century Fox before reverting to Universal Pictures in 2018 following NBCUniversal's acquisition of DreamWorks Animation in 2016.)
- Release dates: May 18, 2002 (Cannes); May 24, 2002 (United States)
- Running time: 83 minutes
- Country: United States
- Language: English
- Budget: $80 million
- Box office: $122.6 million

Spirit: Stallion of the Cimarron (or simply Spirit) is a 2002 American animated Western film directed by Kelly Asbury and Lorna Cook, written by John Fusco, from an idea by Jeffrey Katzenberg, who produced with Mireille Soria. Set in the Old West in the late 19th century, the film follows Spirit, a Kiger mustang stallion (voiced by Matt Damon as a narrator), who is captured during the American Indian Wars by the United States Cavalry; he is eventually freed by a Lakota man named Little Creek with whom he bonds, as well as a mare named Rain.

The film was produced by DreamWorks Animation, combining traditional animation and computer animation. In contrast to the anthropomorphic style of animal characters in other animated features, Spirit and his fellow horses communicate with each other through non-linguistic sounds and body language (albeit with many human facial expressions and reactions).

Spirit: Stallion of the Cimarron was released in theaters on May 24, 2002, by DreamWorks Pictures. The film received generally positive reviews from critics and grossed $122 million worldwide against a budget of $80 million. It was nominated for the Academy Award for Best Animated Feature. The film also launched a media franchise completely using computer animation, with a Netflix spin-off television series Spirit Riding Free premiering on May 5, 2017, followed by a spin-off of the original film, titled Spirit Untamed, released on June 4, 2021.

== Plot ==
In the late 1860s, a Kiger mustang colt, Spirit, is born to a herd of wild horses; he grows into a stallion, and assumes the leadership of the herd. One night, upon following a strange light near his herd, Spirit finds horses tied to a log and their wranglers sleeping around a campfire. The men awaken, and, after a chase, capture Spirit and take him to a US cavalry fort.

The senior officer of the fort, the Colonel, orders Spirit to be broken; however, Spirit defies all attempts, while beating up the farrier. The Colonel retaliates by having him tied to a post for three days without food or water to weaken him. Meanwhile, a Lakota man named Little Creek is also brought into the fort and held captive; his friends toss a knife over the wall for him, which he uses to secretly cut his bonds.

After three days, Spirit is weak enough that the Colonel temporarily subdues him, boasting that any wild horse can eventually be tamed. Seeing the other captive horses' disappointment, Spirit regains his strength and angrily throws the Colonel off, breaking down the corral's wall in the process. Enraged, the Colonel orders his men to kill Spirit; however, Little Creek saves the horse, and the two escape, setting the other captive horses free in the process.

Little Creek and other Lakota people lasso Spirit and return to their village; there, Little Creek unsuccessfully attempts to tame Spirit with kindness. Little Creek ties the other end of Spirit's lead rope to his pet mare, Rain, hoping she can discipline him. Spirit falls in love with Rain, while still remaining hesitant to any attachment to humans. He and Little Creek gradually come to respect each other. Realizing that Spirit is not meant to be domesticated, Little Creek sets him free.

Spirit starts back towards his herd and tries to convince Rain to come with him. They notice the Colonel and his men charging to attack the Lakota village, and return to help. During the confrontation, the Colonel shoots Rain, and she falls into a river; he is about to shoot Little Creek, but Spirit knocks the Colonel off his horse, deflecting the shot and saving Little Creek's life. Trying to rescue Rain, Spirit leaps into the river, but they both plummet over a waterfall. Once out of the water, Spirit stays by Rain's side, only for the cavalry to recapture him and leave her for dead. Little Creek tends to Rain; realizing that Spirit saved his life, he sets out in pursuit of the cavalry.

Spirit is put on a train with other captured horses from the village, and becomes disheartened; however, he has a vision of his herd running free across their homeland, strengthening him again. Spirit and many other horses are then forced to work on the transcontinental railroad, sledging a steam locomotive through the woods. After noticing that the railroad will pass right through his homeland, Spirit pretends to pass out, tricking the men into releasing him, then frees the other horses by kicking their chains off the sledge. The unattached locomotive tumbles backwards down a hill, crashes into another locomotive in a station below, and starts a fire which sets the surrounding forest ablaze. Spirit is trapped when a loose chain around his neck snags on a fallen tree, but Little Creek arrives and cuts him free; together, they escape by jumping into a ravine.

The next morning, the Colonel and his cavalry find Spirit and Little Creek. A chase ensues through the Grand Canyon; eventually, though seemingly trapped at the edge of a wide gorge, Spirit takes a leap of faith to the other side, with Little Creek on his back, which he succeeds at. Impressed, the Colonel stops his men from shooting at Spirit and Little Creek, gives Spirit a nod of respect, and calls off the pursuit. After celebrating their freedom, Spirit and Little Creek return to the Lakotas, meeting up with Rain, who has recovered. Little Creek tells Spirit to take care of Rain after naming him "Spirit, who could not be broken." Spirit leads Rain back to his herd, reuniting with his mother, and they run free across the plains.

== Cast ==
- Matt Damon as Spirit, a Kiger mustang horse
- James Cromwell as The Colonel, leader of a cavalry of soldiers
- Daniel Studi as Little Creek, a Lakota man whom Spirit befriends
- Chopper Bernet as Sgt. Adams, a cavalry sergeant
- Jeff LeBeau as Murphy, the first soldier who tries to break Spirit
  - Jeff LeBeau also voices a Railroad Foreman
- Richard McGonagle as Bill, a wrangler
- Matt Levin as Joe, one of the wranglers
- Adam Paul as Pete, one of the wranglers
- Robert Cait as Jake, one of the wranglers
- Charles Napier as Roy, one of the wranglers
- Zahn McClarnon as Little Creek's Friend
- Michael Horse as Little Creek's Friend
- Donald Fullilove as Train Pull Foreman

== Production ==
=== Development ===
Writer John Fusco, best known for his work in the Western and Native American genres (such as the films Young Guns and Young Guns II), was hired by DreamWorks Animation to create an original screenplay based on an idea by Jeffrey Katzenberg. Fusco began by writing and submitting a novel to the studio and then adapted his own work into a screenplay format. He remained on the project as the main writer over the course of four years, working closely with Katzenberg, the directors, and artists.

=== Animation and design ===
Spirit: Stallion of the Cimarron was made over the course of four years using a conscious blend of traditional hand-drawn animation and computer animation. James Baxter said that the animation was the most difficult piece of production he worked on for a movie: "I literally spent the first few weeks with my door shut, telling everyone, 'Go away; I've got to concentrate.' It was quite daunting because when I first started to draw horses, I suddenly realized how little I knew." The team at DreamWorks, under his guidance, used a horse named "Donner" as the model for Spirit and brought the horse to the animation studio in Glendale, California for the animators to study. The filmmakers decided early on that the animal characters would not speak English: co-director Kelly Asbury opined that "the minute a horse talks, it's comedy" and that human actors would not be able to make the sounds of horses in a manner that the audience would take seriously. Sound designer Tim Chau was dispatched to stables outside Los Angeles to record the sounds of real horses; the final product features real hoof beats and horse vocals that were used to express their vocalizations in the film. Screenwriter Fusco wrote narration as a guide for the animators, but most of this was not used so as not to anthropomorphize the characters: what little remained in the film is voiced by Matt Damon.

The production team, consisting of Kelly Asbury, Lorna Cook, Mireille Soria, Jeffrey Katzenberg, Kathy Altieri, Luc Desmarchelier, Ron Lukas, and story supervisor Ronnie del Carmen took a trip to the western United States to view scenic places they could use as inspiration for locations in the film. The homeland of the mustangs and Lakotas is based on Glacier National Park, Yellowstone National Park, Yosemite National Park, and the Teton mountain range; the cavalry outpost was also based on Monument Valley.

Traveling to all those different places, we were reminded that this is a magnificent country, so in some respects, it was a way for us to honor and to celebrate the grandeur in our own backyard. Geographically, we kind of threw convention out the window. We took the best from nature and gave it our own spin, and ultimately it served the story well.

— Lorna Cook, CinemaReview.com

Additional animation and fine line services were provided by Anvil Studios, Bardel Entertainment and Stardust Pictures.

=== Music ===
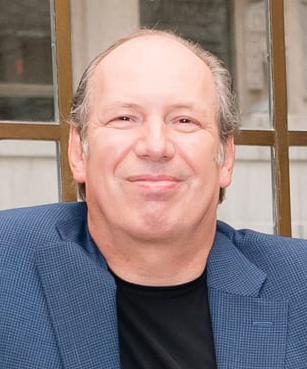
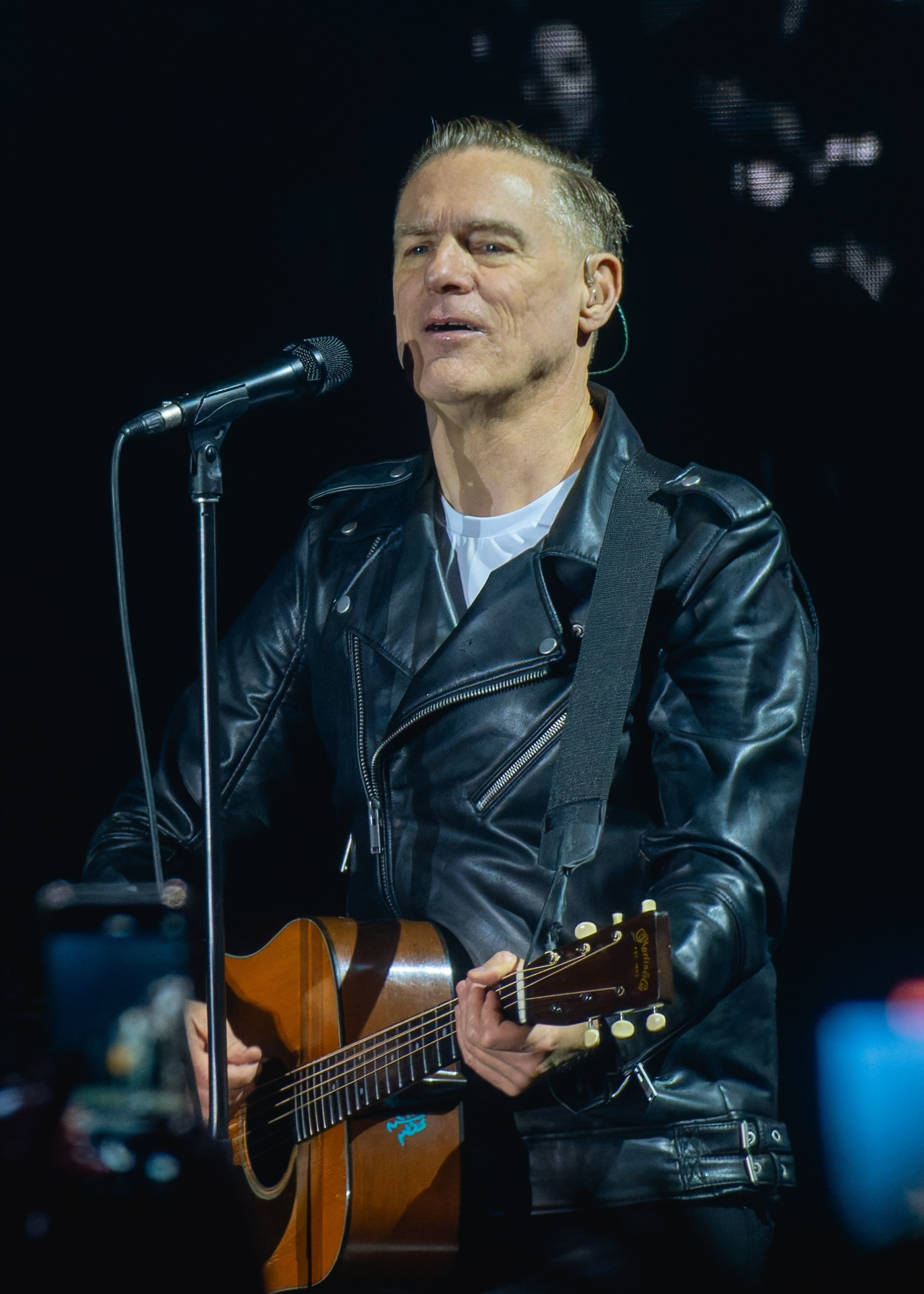
Hans Zimmer (left) composed the film's score and Bryan Adams (right) performed the theme song.

The songs and score were composed by Bryan Adams and Hans Zimmer. The opening theme song for the film, "Here I Am" was composed by Bryan Adams, Gretchen Peters, and Hans Zimmer. It was produced by Jimmy Jam and Terry Lewis. The song "Don't Let Go", performed by Bryan Adams with Sarah McLachlan on harmonies and piano, plays during the ending credits. It was written by Bryan Adams, Gavin Greenaway, Robert John "Mutt" Lange, and Gretchen Peters. Many of the songs and arrangements were set in the American West, with themes based on love, landscapes, brotherhood, struggles, and journeys. Garth Brooks was originally supposed to compose and record songs for the film, but the deal fell through.

== Release ==
Spirit: Stallion of the Cimarron premiered in the "Out of Competition" section at the Cannes Film Festival on May 18, 2002. The film was released theatrically in the United States a few days later on May 24, 2002, by DreamWorks Distribution under their DreamWorks Pictures label.

=== Home media ===
Spirit: Stallion of the Cimarron was released on VHS and DVD on November 19, 2002. It was re-released on DVD on May 18, 2010. The film was released on Blu-ray by Paramount Home Entertainment on May 13, 2014.

== Reception ==
=== Critical response ===
The film received generally positive reviews upon release. On review aggregator Rotten Tomatoes, Spirit: Stallion of the Cimarron holds an overall approval rating of 69% based on 127 reviews, with an average rating of 6.40/10. The site's critical consensus reads: "A visually stunning film that may be too predictable and politically correct for adults, but should serve children well." Review aggregator Metacritic gives the film a weighted average score of 52 out of 100, based on 29 critics, indicating "mixed or average reviews". Audiences polled by CinemaScore gave the film an average grade of "A" on an A+ to F scale.

Critic Roger Ebert gave the film three stars out of four and said in his review, "Uncluttered by comic supporting characters and cute sidekicks, Spirit is more pure and direct than most of the stories we see in animation – a fable I suspect younger viewers will strongly identify with." Leonard Maltin of Hot Ticket called it "one of the most beautiful and exciting animated features ever made". Clay Smith of Access Hollywood considered the film "An Instant Classic". Jason Solomons described the film as "a crudely drawn DreamWorks animation about a horse that saves the West by bucking a US Army General". USA Today's Claudia Puig gave it 3 stars out of 4, writing that the filmmakers' "most significant achievement is fashioning a movie that will touch the hearts of both children and adults, as well as bring audiences to the edge of their seats." Dave Kehr of the New York Times criticized the way in which the film portrayed Spirit and Little Creek as "pure cliches" and suggested that the film could have benefited from a comic relief character. The film was screened out of competition at the 2002 Cannes Film Festival. Rain was the first animated horse to receive an honorary registration certificate from the American Paint Horse Association (APHA).

=== Box office ===
When the film opened on Memorial Day Weekend 2002, the film earned $17,770,036 on the Friday-Sunday period, and $23,213,736 through the four-day weekend for a $6,998 average from 3,317 theaters. The film overall opened in fourth place behind Star Wars: Episode II – Attack of the Clones, Spider-Man, and Insomnia. In its second weekend, the film retreated 36% to $11,303,814 for a $3,362 average from expanding to 3,362 theaters and finishing in fifth place for the weekend. In its third weekend, the film decreased 18% to $9,303,808 for a $2,767 average from 3,362 theaters. The film closed on September 12, 2002, after earning $73,280,117 in the United States and Canada with an additional $49,283,422 overseas for a worldwide total of $122,563,539, against an $80 million budget.

=== Accolades ===
Award	Category	Recipient(s)	Result
ASCAP Film and Television Music Awards	Top Box Office	Hans Zimmer; Bryan Adams	Won
Academy Awards	Best Animated Feature	Jeffrey Katzenberg	Nominated
Annie Awards	Animated Theatrical Feature		Nominated
Annie Awards	Individual Achievement in Storyboarding	Ronnie Del Carmen	Won
Annie Awards	Individual Achievement in Storyboarding	Larry Leker	Nominated
Annie Awards	Individual Achievement in Storyboarding	Simon Wells	Nominated
Annie Awards	Individual Achievement in Production Design	Luc Desmarchelier	Won
Annie Awards	Individual Achievement in Character Design	Carlos Grangel	Won
Annie Awards	Individual Achievement in Effects Animation	Yancy Landquist	Won
Annie Awards	Individual Achievement in Effects Animation	Jamie Lloyd	Nominated
Critics Choice Awards	Best Animated Feature		Nominated
Genesis Awards	Feature Film'		Won
Golden Globes	Best Original Song – Motion Picture	Hans Zimmer (music); Bryan Adams (lyrics); Gretchen Peters (lyrics) for the song "Here I Am"	Nominated
Kids' Choice Awards	Favorite Voice from an Animated Movie	Matt Damon	Nominated
Golden Reel Award	Best Sound Editing in Animated Features	Tim Chau (supervising sound editor); Carmen Baker (supervising sound editor); Jim Brookshire (supervising dialogue editor/supervising adr editor); Nils C. Jensen (sound editor); Albert Gasser (sound editor); David Kern (sound editor); Piero Mura (sound editor); Bruce Tanis (sound editor)	Nominated
Golden Reel Award	Best Sound Editing in Animated Features – Music	Slamm Andrews (music editor/scoring editor); Robb Boyd (music editor)	Nominated
Online Film Critics Society Awards	Best Animated Feature		Nominated
Phoenix Film Critics Society Awards	Best Animated Film		Nominated
Golden Satellite Awards	Best Motion Picture, Animated or Mixed Media		Nominated
Visual Effects Society Awards	Best Character Animation in an Animated Motion Picture	James Baxter	Nominated
Western Heritage Awards	Theatrical Motion Picture	Mireille Soria (producer); Jeffrey Katzenberg (producer); Kelly Asbury (director); Lorna Cook (director); John Fusco (writer); Matt Damon (principal actor); James Cromwell (principal actor); Daniel Studi (principal actor)	Won
World Soundtrack Awards	Best Original Song Written for a Film	Hans Zimmer; Bryan Adams (lyricist/performer); R.J. Lange (lyricist) for the song "This Is Where I Belong"	Nominated
World Soundtrack Awards	Best Original Song Written for a Film	Hans Zimmer; Bryan Adams (lyricist/performer); Gretchen Peters (lyricist) for the song "Here I Am"	Nominated
Young Artist Awards	Best Family Feature Film – Animation		Won

== Expanded franchise ==
=== Video games ===
Two video games based on the film were released on October 28, 2002, by THQ: the PC game Spirit: Stallion of the Cimarron — Forever Free and the Game Boy Advance game Spirit: Stallion of the Cimarron — Search for Homeland.

A third game "Lucky's Big Adventure" was released in 2021 based on the "Untamed" film sequel below.

=== Book series ===
Shortly after the movie, a book series called "Spirit of the West" was released by Kathleen Duey; it tells the story of Spirit's family lineage and herd.

=== Spin-off television series and film ===
An animated spin-off series, Spirit Riding Free, premiered on Netflix on May 5, 2017. The series follows all the daring adventures when Spirit, the offspring of the original, meets a girl named Lucky whose courage matches his own.

A computer-animated film, titled Spirit Untamed, was released on June 4, 2021. It is based on Spirit Riding Free as well as a spin-off of the original film.

== See also ==
- List of animated feature films
- List of films about horses
