= Kiger mustang =

Strain of mustang horse originating in Oregon, US

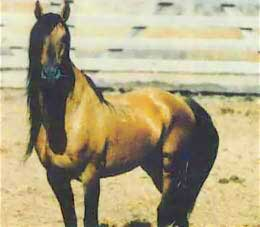
- Mesteño, a Kiger mustang stallion
- Country of origin: United States

Traits
- Distinguishing features: Some horses are gaited, every equine color, with dun the most common. Athletic, strong.

Breed standards
- Kiger Mesteño Association

The Kiger mustang is a strain of mustang horse located in the southeastern part of the U.S. state of Oregon. The name applies only to wild-captured individuals and does not apply to their bred-in-captivity progeny, which are known as Kiger horses. The Bureau of Land Management (BLM) administers two herd management areas for Kiger mustangs in the Burns District—Kiger and Riddle Mountain, in the Steens Mountain area. DNA testing has shown that Kiger mustangs are descended largely from Spanish horses brought to North America in the 17th century, a bloodline thought to have largely disappeared from mustang herds before the Kiger horse populations were discovered in 1977.

Kiger mustangs are most often dun in color, although they are found in other solid coat colors. Compact and well-muscled in appearance, their coloration and phenotype make them some of the most desired by private buyers when horses are removed from the feral herds. The BLM rounds up the horses from the two herd management areas every three to four years, and auctions excess horses to the public, returning horses to public lands that meet the desired coloration and phenotype and sometimes exchanging horses between the two herds to maintain genetic diversity. Horses in private ownership may be registered in several breed associations, the largest and oldest being the Kiger Mesteño Association, established in 1988.

== Characteristics ==
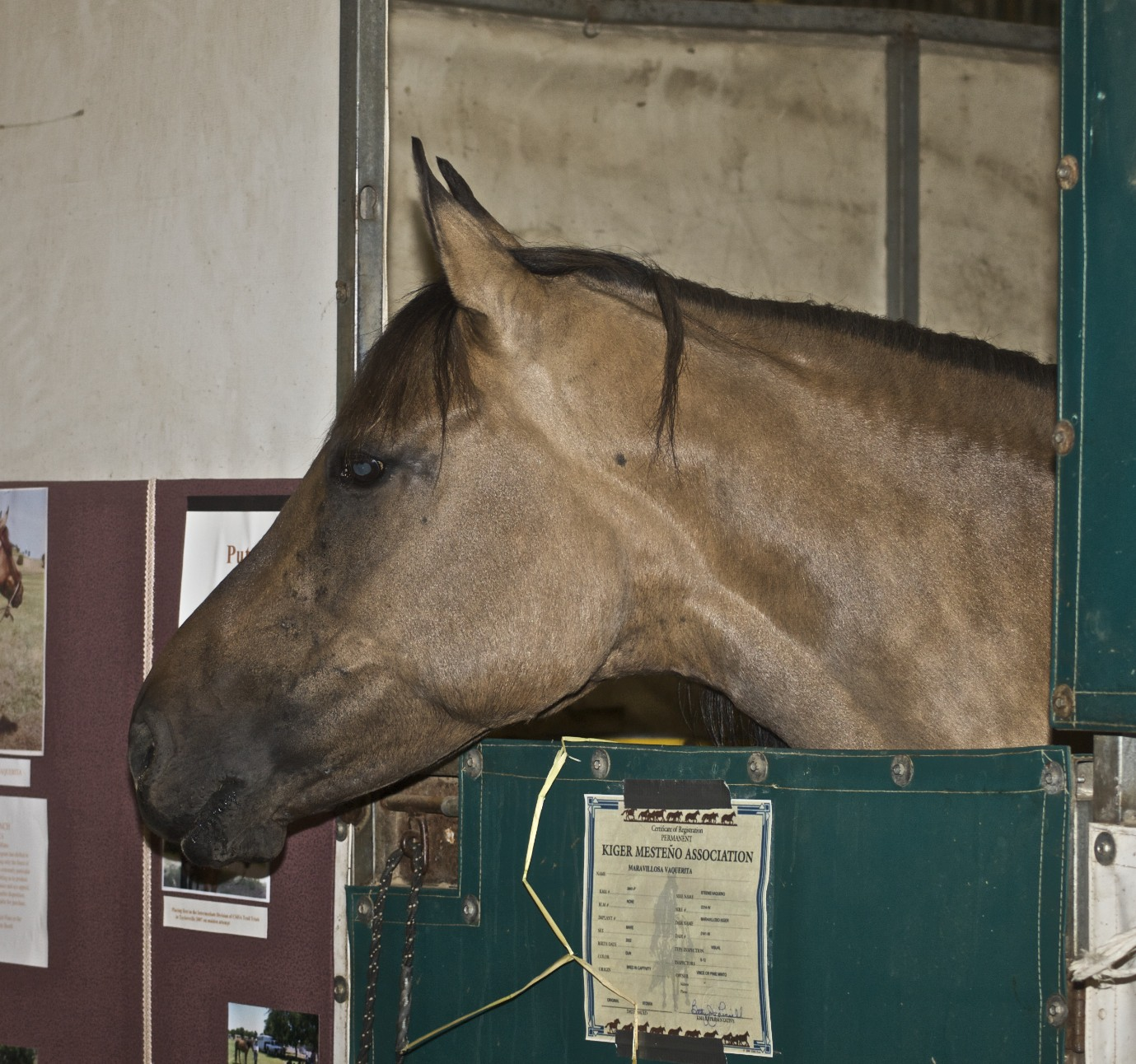
A Kiger mustang

Kiger mustangs are most commonly dun in color, although the breed registry also allows bay, black and roan horses to be registered. There are numerous shades of dun, all variations on a tan base, and many shades have their own names. The Kiger Mesteño Association separates dun shades into four categories: dun, red dun, grulla, and claybank. "Dun" as used by the Kiger registry covers dun horses with black points, and adds the terms zebra dun, dusty dun, smutty dun or coyote dun, depending on the exact shade of body color. Red dun, or the variation "apricot dun", covers horses with points that are red, brown or flaxen. Grulla covers horses with blueish, mousy or slate-colored bodies and black points, and these horses may also be called lobo duns, olive grullas, silver grullas or smutty grullas. Claybank, another variation of red dun, describes Kiger horses who have golden body coats with red or orange tints and darker red points. Dun horses may have primitive markings, which include any of the following: a dorsal stripe, lightened outer guard hairs on the manes and/or tails, zebra-like stripes on the upper legs, transverse striping over the upper shoulders, dark color around the muzzle, and ears with dark outlines and lighter interiors.

Kiger mustangs generally stand 13.2 to 15.2 hands (54 to 62 inches, 137 to 157 cm) high. They are compact, well-muscled horses with deep chests and short backs. In general, they are agile and intelligent, with the stamina and sure-footedness seen in many feral horse breeds. They are generally bold but gentle and calm. They are used for pleasure riding as well as endurance riding, assorted performance competition under saddle, driving, and many other situations where an athletic horse is desired.

== History ==
Horses have been present in the American West since the 1500s, when they arrived with Spanish explorers. Many escaped, were released by the Spanish or stolen by Native Americans. Their descendants crossed with horses who escaped from or were released by other European settlers, including draft breeds brought by farmers and wagoneers and lighter riding horses brought by the United States Cavalry. Horses of French descent also moved across the border from Canada to contribute to the herds. The mixture of these breeds created the mustang present in the western portion of the US today. By the early 1970s, it was assumed that due to crossbreeding, the original Spanish stock had been eliminated from feral herds. In 1971, the Wild and Free-Roaming Horse and Burro Act was passed, giving the Bureau of Land Management (BLM) the authority to manage the feral horse populations in the American West.

Discovery of the Kiger mustang was the result of a BLM mustang roundup in the Beatys Butte area in Harney County in 1977. During the roundup, it was noticed that among the horses collected from the area, there was a group with similar color and markings. DNA testing by the University of Kentucky showed close relation to the Iberian horses brought to the Americas by the Spanish in the 17th century. These distinct horses were separated from the other horses and the BLM placed two groups in separate areas of Steens Mountain to preserve the breed. Seven horses were placed in the Riddle Mountain Herd Management Area (HMA) and twenty in the Kiger HMA.

In 2001, the Kiger mustang was proposed as the state horse of Oregon. State Senator Steve Harper proposed Senate Joint Resolution 10 after being encouraged to do so by the Kiger Mesteño Association. The resolution, however, failed to pass. Kiger mustangs have been used as models for model horses and animated films. The original herd stallion Mesteño was used as the model for a series of Breyer Horses, showing the horse at several ages from foal to old age. It was the first time the company had made a series of models showing the same horse. The artist's model for the title horse of the animated film Spirit: Stallion of the Cimarron was a Kiger Mustang named Donner, who now lives at the Return to Freedom American Wild Horse Sanctuary.

== BLM management and private ownership ==
The Kiger HMA, 45 miles (72 km) southeast of Burns, Oregon, and 2 miles (3.2 km) east of Diamond, Oregon, covers 36,618 acres (148.19 km^{2}) and hosts a population that ranges between 51 and 83 horses. The Riddle Mountain HMA, 50 miles (80 km) southeast of Burns, covers 28,000 acres (110 km^{2}) and contains between 33 and 56 horses. Horses are sometimes exchanged between the herds to maintain the highest possible level of genetic diversity. After roundups, horses with the desired physical characteristics (including phenotype and coloration) are returned to the herds to maintain a high quality of breeding stock. The herds are rounded up every three to four years, and excess horses are auctioned to the public. At two of the more recent auctions, in 2007 and 2011, over 100 horses were auctioned at each event. The 2007 event resulted in 106 horses being adopted to homes in 14 states for a total of $100,206. The two horses with the highest bids went for $7,800 and $7,400. This is much higher than the adoption fees paid for other mustangs; horses removed from other herds in Oregon can be adopted for a walk-up fee of $125.

Genetic testing has shown that Kiger mustang is a descendant of the Colonial Spanish Horse. The bloodline of many of today's Kiger mustangs can be traced back to a single stallion named Mesteño, captured with the original herd in 1977 and released back to the Kiger HMA. Several organizations exist which inspect and register Kiger mustangs; each has its own standards for entry into the stud book. In 1988, the Kiger Mustang Association (now the Kiger Mesteño Association) was formed as the original registry for the herd. By 2013, the organization had registered around 800 horses, and annually inspects between 75 and 100 new horses. Two other associations are the Steens Mountain Kiger Registry, established in 1993, and the Kiger Horse Association and Registry. The Kiger mustangs of the Riddle Mountain and Kiger HMAs are the best known herds of mustangs in Oregon, despite making up only a small portion of the population. As of 2013, the state had a total estimated BLM-managed feral horse population of almost 2,600, roaming over 17 HMAs and a Wild Horse Territory co-managed with the US Forest Service. A census taken in April 2010 found 60 Kiger mustangs in the Riddle Mountain HMA and 81 in the Kiger HMA; estimates made in February 2013 list 40 horses in Riddle Mountain and 61 in Kiger.
