= Aury Wallington =

American novelist

Aury Wallington is an American novelist and television writer.

== Biography ==
Following her Pennsylvania birth, Wallington worked in New Orleans. After a stint in New York City as personal assistant to an actor, she began her television career. Wallington currently lives in Los Angeles.

== Work ==
Wallington has written six novels. These are:

- Heroes: Saving Charlie - The first in the official Heroes book series.
- Pop! - A teenage novel.
- The OC
  - Cohen
  - Bait and Switch
  - Spring Break
  - The Misfit.

Wallington has written three anthologies and eight scripts for television. These are:

- The pilot for USA Death Benefits
- The pilot for ABC Family Will Triumph Fights Alone
- The pilot for ABC Family Menace to Society
- Heroes: "Once Upon a Time in Texas"
- The Wedding Album pilot
- One episode for Courting Alex called "Big Client".
- Two episodes for Veronica Mars titled "Like a Virgin" and "Clash of the Tritons".
- One episode for Sex and the City, "The Cold War".
- Two episodes for Gravity Falls, "Headhunters" and "The Time Traveler's Pig".

She also created the Netflix original series Spirit Riding Free and served as the co-writer for its 2021 feature film, Spirit Untamed with Kristin Hahn.
