= Kiger =

Kiger is a surname. Notable people with the surname include:

- Dan Kiger, American politician from North Carolina
- Susan Kiger (born 1953), American model and actress
- Mark Kiger (born 1980), American retired professional baseball infielder

== See also ==
- Kiger Creek, tributary of Swamp Creek in Harney County in the U.S. state of Oregon
- Kiger Island, island in Oregon
- Kiger Mustang, strain of Mustang horse located in the southeastern part of the U.S. state of Oregon
- Kiger Stadium, baseball stadium in Klamath Falls, Oregon
- Renault Kiger, a subcompact crossover car model
- Kiger, people who perform animegao kigurumi
