= Wildhorse Creek (Alvord Lake) =

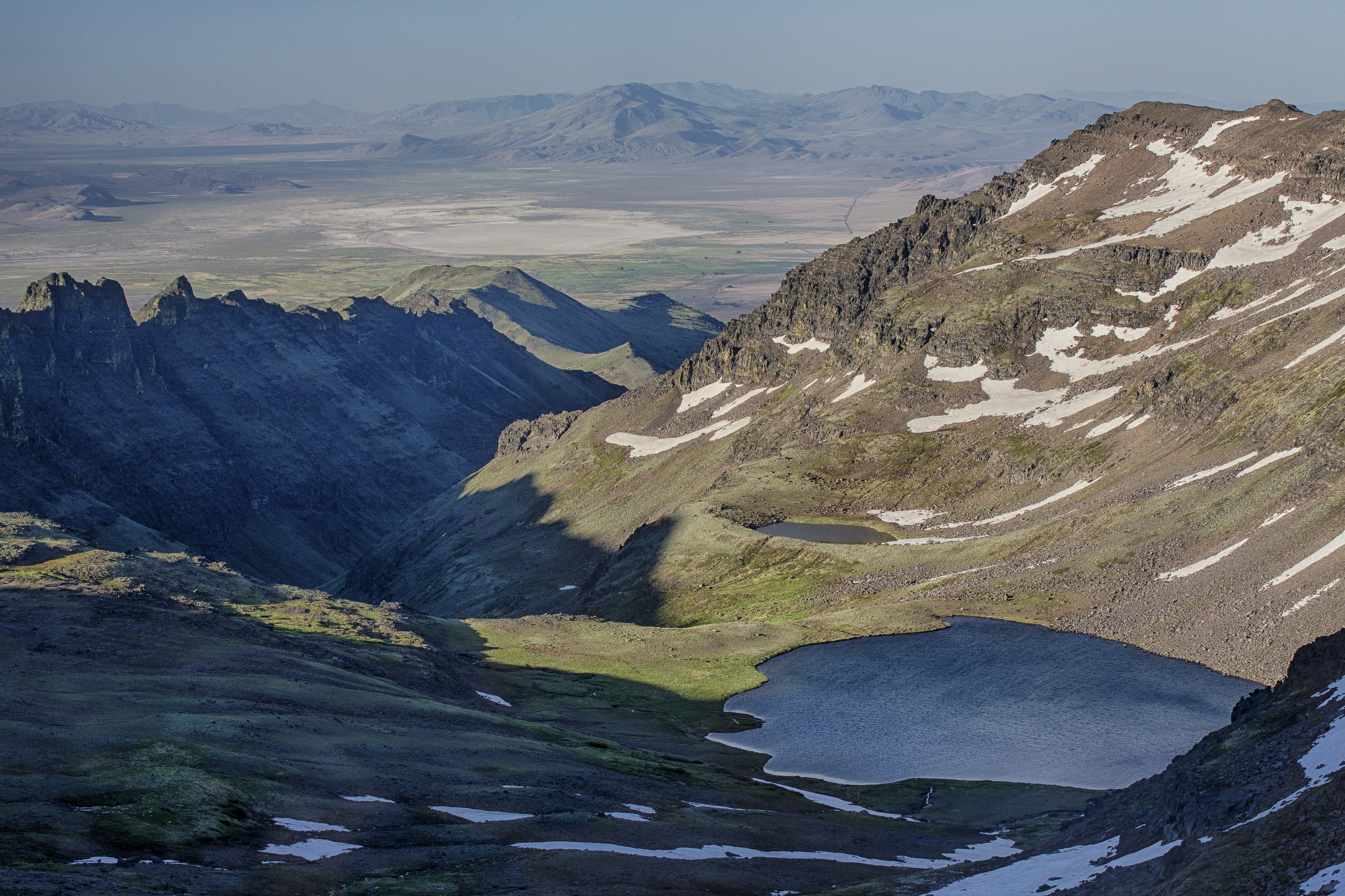
- Wildhorse Lake and Canyon

- Location of the mouth of Wildhorse Creek in Oregon

Location
- Country: United States
- State: Oregon
- County: Harney

Physical characteristics
- Source: Steens Mountain
  - location: Oregon
  - coordinates: 42°38′16″N 118°35′07″W
  - elevation: 8,943 ft (2,726 m)
- Mouth: Alvord Lake
  - coordinates: 42°24′26″N 118°36′24″W
  - elevation: 4,026 ft (1,227 m)

National Wild and Scenic Rivers System
- Type: Wild
- Designated: October 30, 2000

Wildhorse Creek is a tributary of Alvord Lake in Harney County in the U.S. state of Oregon. It originates at a spring on Steens Mountain and flows generally south through Wildhorse Canyon to the shallow alkaline lake, south of the Alvord Desert and north of the unincorporated community of Fields.

Near the headwaters, the creek enters and exits Wildhorse Lake, which lies in a hanging valley. The upper 7-mile (11 km) of the creek, including Wildhorse Lake, are part of the National Wild and Scenic Rivers System. In addition, a 2.6-mile (4.2 km) tributary, Little Wildhorse Creek, is part of the system. Wildhorse Creek and Little Wildhorse Creek flow through the Steens Mountain Wilderness before entering private land at lower elevations.

Designated "wild", the creek's watershed is home to mule deer, elk, bighorn sheep and pronghorn. Wildhorse Lake, covering about 20 acres (8 ha), supports populations of Lahontan cutthroat trout, which spawn in the creek.

The ghost town of Andrews, Oregon, lies in the Wildhorse Valley west of the creek. Slightly north of the ghost town is the Wildhorse Valley Airport.

== Tributaries ==
From source to mouth, the named tributaries of Wildhorse Creek begin with Little Wildhorse Creek, which flows into the main stem in Wildhorse Canyon. In the Wildhorse Valley east of Steens Mountain, Willow, Willow Spring, Deppy, Stonehouse, Spring, Wilson, Andrews, Butte, Juniper, and Miranda creeks enter the main stem. All the tributaries enter from the right.

== See also ==
- List of rivers of Oregon
- List of National Wild and Scenic Rivers
