= Kiger Creek (Harney County, Oregon) =

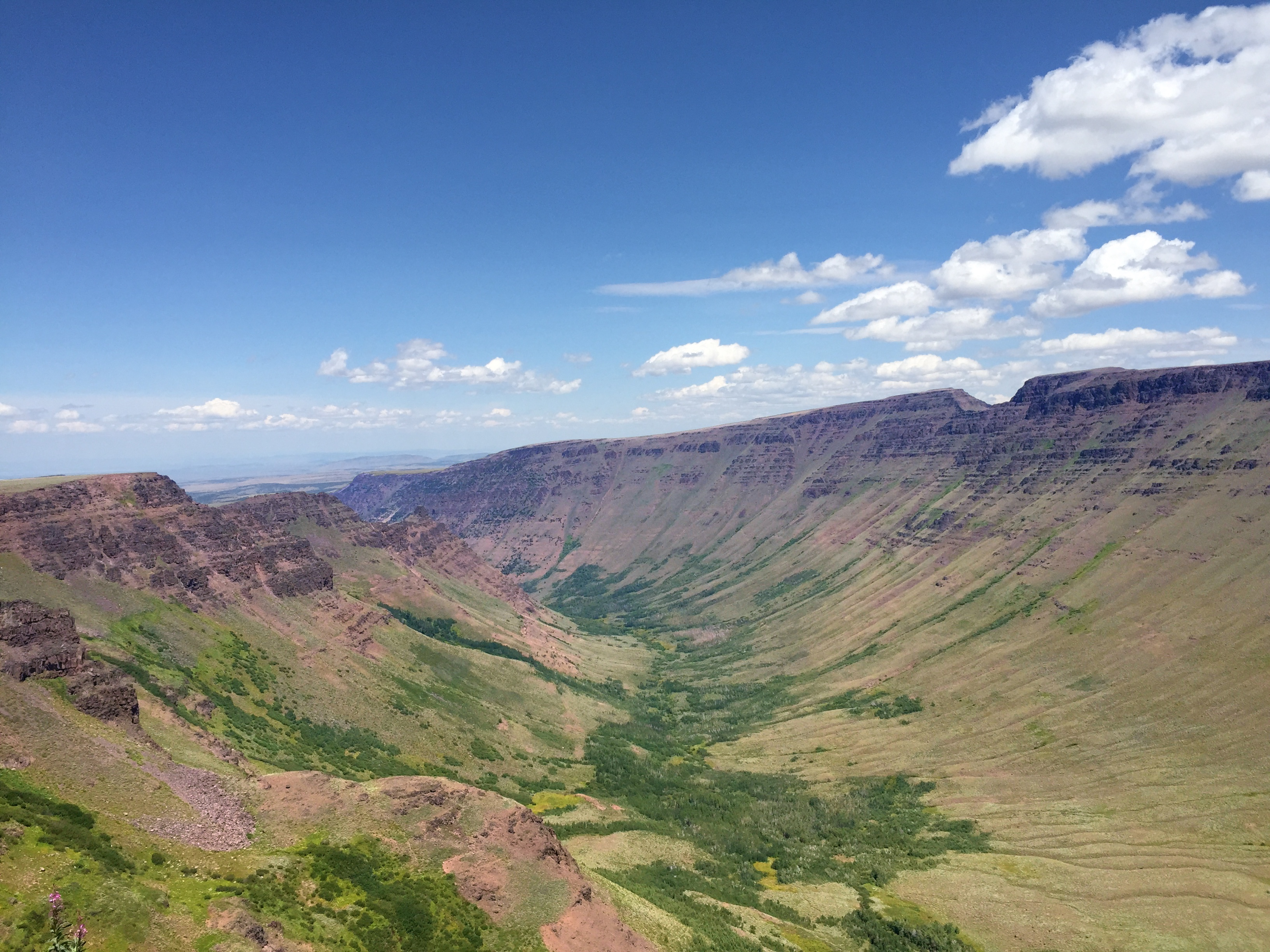
- Kiger Gorge, looking north, downstream

- Location of the mouth of Kiger Creek in Oregon
- Etymology: For the Kiger family, who briefly settled in the vicinity in the 1870s

Location
- Country: United States
- State: Oregon
- County: Harney

Physical characteristics
- Source: Steens Mountain
  - location: Oregon
  - coordinates: 42°42′29″N 118°33′57″W
  - elevation: 7,979 ft (2,432 m)
- Mouth: Swamp Creek
  - coordinates: 43°01′59″N 118°42′48″W
  - elevation: 4,163 ft (1,269 m)

National Wild and Scenic Rivers System
- Type: Wild
- Designated: October 30, 2000

Kiger Creek is a tributary of Swamp Creek in Harney County in the U.S. state of Oregon. It originates on Steens Mountain and flows generally north through Kiger Gorge to meet Swamp Creek near the unincorporated community of Diamond. The combined streams flow into Diamond Swamp and the Malheur National Wildlife Refuge.

A 4.3-mile (6.9 km) segment of Kiger Creek, from its headwaters to where it crosses the Steens Mountain Wilderness boundary, is part of the National Wild and Scenic Rivers System. Designated "wild", the creek supports a population of redband trout, and its watershed includes habitat for mule deer, elk, bighorn sheep, and pronghorn.

== Name ==
Kiger Creek as well as Kiger Island in the Willamette River near Corvallis are named for Reuben C. Kiger and his family, pioneers who settled in Benton County in the mid-19th century. In 1874, they moved to Harney County to the Steens Mountain vicinity but, fearing Native Americans, returned to western Oregon in 1878. Minerva J. (Dolly) Kiger named the creek as well as one of its tributaries, Cucamonga Creek, and another nearby stream, McCoy Creek.

== Recreation ==
Near the creek's source is Kiger Gorge Overlook, a recreation site managed by the Bureau of Land Management (BLM). The U-shaped gorge, carved through basalt by ice age glaciers, is about a half-mile deep. The overlook is 22 miles (35 km) from the unincorporated community of Frenchglen along Steens Mountain Loop Road. The site is generally open from July 4 through November 1.

At a somewhat lower elevation of 7,800 feet (2,400 m) above sea level is the Jackman Park Campground. It is along Steens Mountain Loop Road about 3 miles (5 km) from Kiger Gorge Overlook and 19 miles (31 km) from Frenchglen. Open from June 10 to November 1, the BLM campground has six sites, toilets, and picnic tables.

The Kiger Wild Horse Viewing Area, also managed by the BLM, is in the vicinity. It consists of 37,000 acres (15,000 ha) of habitat suitable for free-roaming Kiger mustangs. The area has several viewing sites, generally open from May 1 to November 15. The access road to the site is about 3 miles (5 km) from Diamond.

== Tributaries ==
Named tributaries of Kiger Creek, listed from source to mouth, include Big Pasture Creek, which enters from the right, then Mud, Little Kiger, and Poison creeks, all from the right. Cucamonga Creek enters from the left, downstream of where Kiger Creek splits into two distributaries and passes under Diamond Lane as it nears Swamp Creek.

== See also ==
- List of National Wild and Scenic Rivers
- List of rivers of Oregon
