= Alvord Lake (Oregon) =

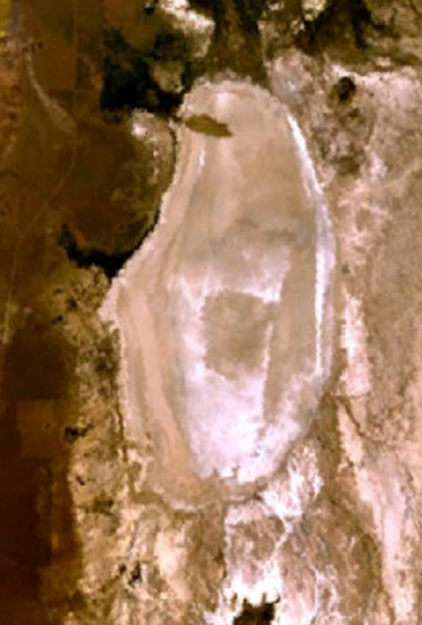
- Satellite image of Alvord Lake

- Location of Alvord Lake in Oregon, USA. Alvord Lake (the United States)
- Location: Harney County, Oregon, U.S.
- Coordinates: 42°22′47″N 118°36′20″W
- Type: seasonal, alkali
- Primary inflows: Mosquito Creek, Willow Creek, Wildhorse Creek, Whitehorse Creek, Trout Creek, and Van Horn Creek
- Catchment area: 2,150 mi^{2} (5,600 km^{2})
- Basin countries: United States

Alvord Lake is a seasonal shallow alkali lake in Harney County of the U.S. state of Oregon. Its elevation is 4,026 feet (1,227 m). It is located about 10 miles (16 km) southeast of Alvord Desert in the Alvord Basin and serves as terminus for all its streams. Its water level varies from dry to several feet deep. The nearest habitation is tiny Fields, 14.1 kilometres (8.8 mi) SSW.

At one time, Alvord Lake stretched 100 miles (160 km) along the east side of Steens Mountain.

The Alvord Basin covers about 2,150 square miles (5,600 km^{2}) bounded on the northwest by Steens Mountain, on the southwest by the Pueblo Mountains, on the southeast by the Trout Creek Mountains, and on the northeast by the Sheepshead Mountains. Major tributaries are Mosquito Creek, Willow Creek, Wildhorse Creek, Whitehorse Creek, Trout Creek, and Van Horn Creek.

The tributaries of Alvord Lake were home to the endemic Alvord cutthroat trout, which is now considered extinct through hybridization with non-native rainbow trout.

== See also ==
- List of lakes in Oregon
