= Diamond, Oregon =

Unincorporated community in the state of Oregon, United States

- Unincorporated community
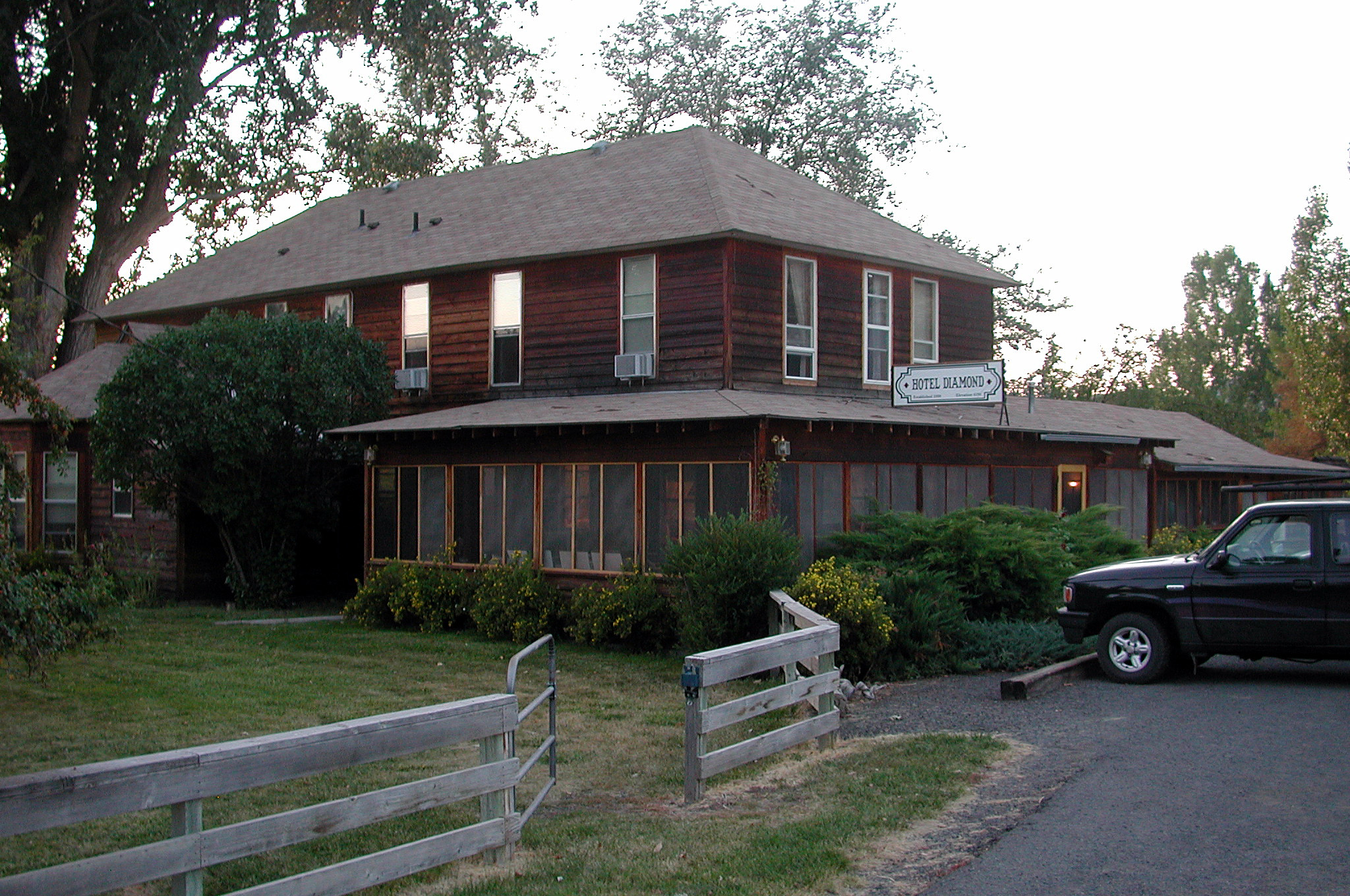
- Hotel Diamond

- Location within Oregon Location within the United States
- Coordinates: 43°00′44″N 118°39′58″W
- Country: United States
- State: Oregon
- County: Harney
- Elevation: 4,219 ft (1,286 m)
- Time zone: UTC-8 (PST)
  - Summer (DST): UTC-7 (PDT)
- ZIP codes: 97722
- Area code: 541
- GNIS feature ID: 1136216

Diamond is an unincorporated community in Harney County, Oregon, United States. Diamond is west of Oregon Route 205 and south of Malheur Lake, 52 miles (84 km) south-southeast of Burns by highway. Its post office is assigned ZIP code 97722.

== History ==
Settled in 1874–75, the community got its name from a diamond-shaped branding iron used by a local cattle rancher on the Diamond Ranch. Diamond Craters, the Diamond post office, and other features in the vicinity took their name from the ranch, established in the area by the pioneer settler Mace McCoy. A post office was established at Diamond in 1887.

Another early settler, Minerva J. (Dolly) Kiger, is credited with applying the name of the ranch to the community in 1874. She also named Kiger Creek, which originates on Steens Mountain and enters Swamp Creek near Diamond, and she named two other nearby steams, Cucamonga Creek and McCoy Creek.

== Geography ==
Diamond lies along Swamp Creek at the head of Diamond Valley, northwest of Steens Mountain in southeastern Oregon. Swamp Creek flows into Diamond Swamp, a short distance down the valley. The swamp is part of the Malheur National Wildlife Refuge. Diamond Lane, which runs generally east–west, links the community to Route 205 between Frenchglen to the south and Burns to the north.

Adjacent to the swamp on the east is Diamond Craters, about 6 miles (10 km) northwest of Diamond. This 23-square-mile (60 km^{2}) area of diverse basaltic features is protected as an Outstanding Natural Area, overseen by the Bureau of Land Management.

=== Climate ===
According to the Köppen Climate Classification system, Diamond has a semi-arid climate, abbreviated "BSk" on climate maps.

== Education ==
The zoned K-8 school is Diamond Elementary School.

High school students are zoned to Crane Union High School, of Harney County Union High School District 1J.

Harney County is not in a community college district but has a "contract out of district" (COD) with Treasure Valley Community College. TVCC operates the Burns Outreach Center in Burns.

== Healthcare ==
In 1989, Nellie Nix of The Bulletin described the catchment area of Harney District Hospital in Burns as being Harney County. In 2005 Matthew Preusch of The Oregonian, citing the lack of doctors and long distances between the southern part of the county and the hospital, described the southern part of Harney County, which includes Diamond, as "the most medically underserved area of all."
