= Mickey Hot Springs =

Thermal springs in Oregon

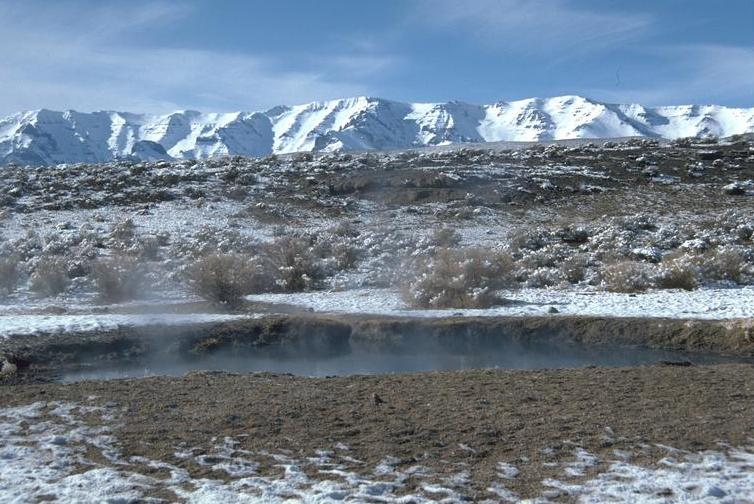
- Hot springs with Steens Mountain in background

- Location within Oregon Location within the United States
- Interactive map of Mickey Hot Springs
- Location: Harney County, Oregon
- Coordinates: 42.67676°N 118.34659°W
- Elevation: 4,035 ft (1,230 m)
- Type: Geothermal
- Eruption height: 6–8 ft (1.8–2.4 m)
- Frequency: Ongoing
- Temperature: 77–212 °F (25–100 °C)
- Depth: ~10 ft (3.0 m)

Mickey Hot Springs is a small hot spring system in southeastern Oregon, United States. The hot springs are located at the north end of the Alvord Desert just east of Steens Mountain and north of the 2-6 Hot Springs which are much larger but less known. There are several natural bubbling mudpots and steam vents. The system contains at least 60 vents, 11 of which are dry. The hydrothermal system may be in its waning stages of existence.

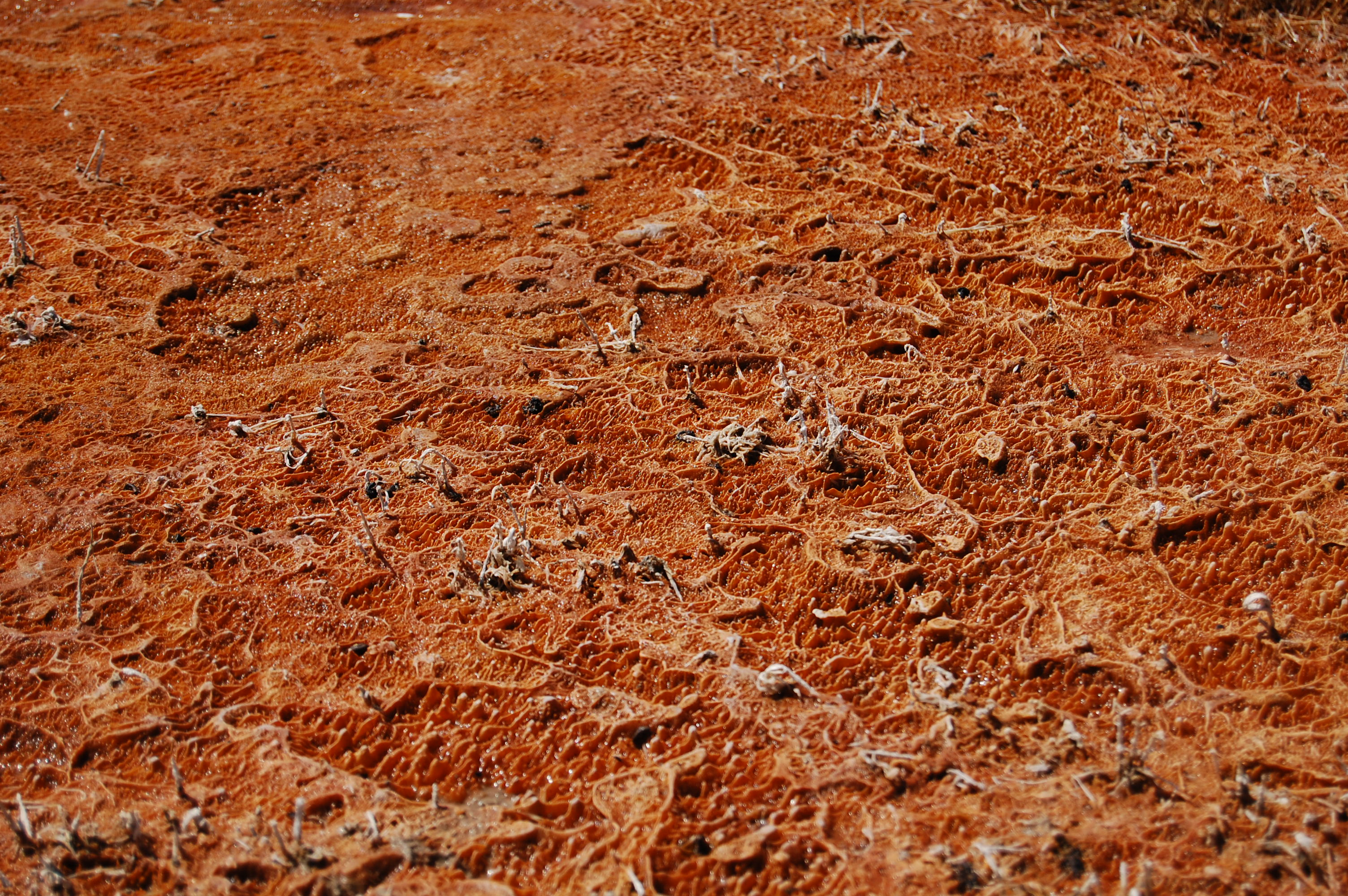
A biofilm of thermophilic bacteria in the outflow the springs.

Each vent has a characteristic temperature ranging from 77–212 °F (25–100 °C) with the average about 171 °F (77 °C). The majority of the vents are far too hot for bathing. The water pH is neutral to slightly alkaline. An ecosystem of thermophilic organisms exist in the springs, separated by temperature strata.
