= Creffield =

Creffield is a surname. Notable people with the surname include:

- Dennis Creffield (1931–2018), British artist
- Edmund Creffield (c. 1870–1906), German-American religious leader
