= Bride of Christ (disambiguation) =

The bride of Christ is a metaphor for the Christian Church.

Bride of Christ or Brides of Christ may also refer to:

- Christian nun, a woman who vows to dedicate her life to Christian service and contemplation
- Consecrated virgin, a virgin woman who has been consecrated by the Church as a bride of Christ
- Bride of Christ Church, a Christian denomination founded by Edmund Creffield
- Brides of Christ, an Australian television miniseries

== Music ==
- "Bride of Christ", a song by Astral Doors from the 2005 album Evil is Forever
- "Bride of Christ", a song by Faith from the 2005 album Sorg
