= Whorehouse Meadow =

Meadow in Oregon, United States

Coordinates: 42.7306°N 118.6304°W

Whorehouse Meadow is a meadow located on the western slope of Steens Mountain southeast of Frenchglen, Oregon, United States. It lies within the Steens Mountain Wilderness. Lewis McArthur, writing about the landmark in Oregon Geographic Names, describes it as an "accessible but secluded meadow a mile east of Fish Lake."

The meadow acquired its name in the days of the Old West. Entrepreneuring women from Vale, Oregon, would set up wood and canvas tents in the meadow to provide services to the sheepherders and cattlemen of the area. Many of the sheepherders were Basque American immigrants, and their sometimes explicit carvings can still be found in the bark of aspen trees surrounding the meadow. The name was changed in the 1960s to "Naughty Girl Meadow" on Bureau of Land Management maps, but in 1981 the old name was restored after public outcry. Whorehouse Meadow has frequently been noted on lists of unusual place names.
