= Valley of the Giants (Oregon) =

Grove of large trees

- Location within Oregon Location within the United States

Geography
- Location: Oregon, United States
- Coordinates: 44°56′10.92″N 123°42′55.68″W
- Area: 51 acres (21 ha)

Administration
- Authority: Bureau of Land Management

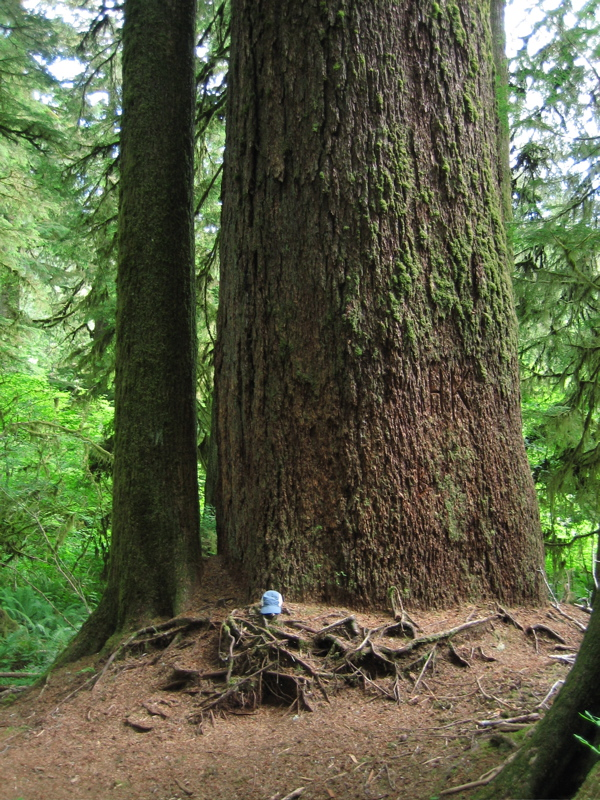
Large Douglas fir in Valley of the Giants

The Valley of the Giants is a 51-acre (21 ha) forest preserve owned and managed by the Bureau of Land Management and is located in a remote portion of the Oregon Coast Range of Northwest Oregon in the United States, near the former company town of Valsetz. Receiving greater than 180 inches (4,600 mm) of rain annually, the preserve is home to many large specimens of Douglas-fir and Western Hemlock. A famous specimen is "Big Guy" which at one time was the second largest Douglas-fir known standing in Oregon. Before "Big Guy" was blown down by a wind storm in 1981, it was estimated to be over 600 years old, stood approximately 230 feet (70 m) above the forest floor, and had an estimated 36.5-foot (11.1 m) girth.

Valley of the Giants Trailhead 44°56′N 123°42′W

In 1976, the Bureau of Land Management designated the site as an Outstanding Natural Area. The Valley of the Giants is located 30 miles (50 km) west of Falls City via logging roads generally suitable for passenger cars, if driven slowly. Visitors are encouraged to call BLM's Salem District Office at 503-375-5646 for directions and road information.

As of June 6, 2008, the Oregon Heritage Tree Program dedicated the Valley of the Giants Outstanding Natural Area as a Heritage Tree Grove.
