= Steens Mountain Wilderness =

Nature reserve in Oregon, United States

- IUCN category Ib (wilderness area)
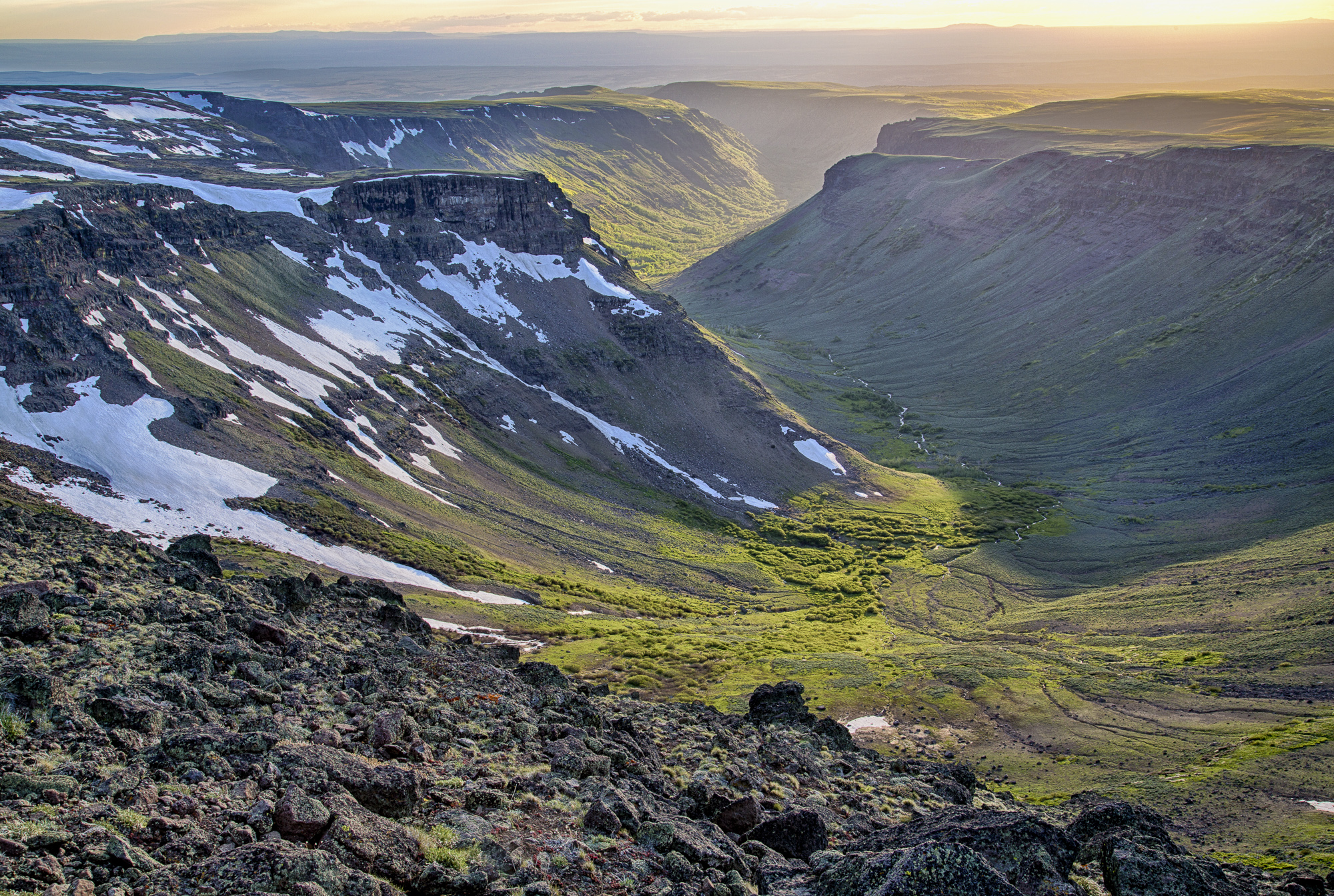

- Location within the United States
- Location: Harney County, Oregon, United States
- Nearest city: Burns, Oregon
- Coordinates: 42°40′00″N 118°45′04″W
- Area: 170,166 acres (68,864 ha)
- Established: October 30, 2000
- Governing body: Bureau of Land Management

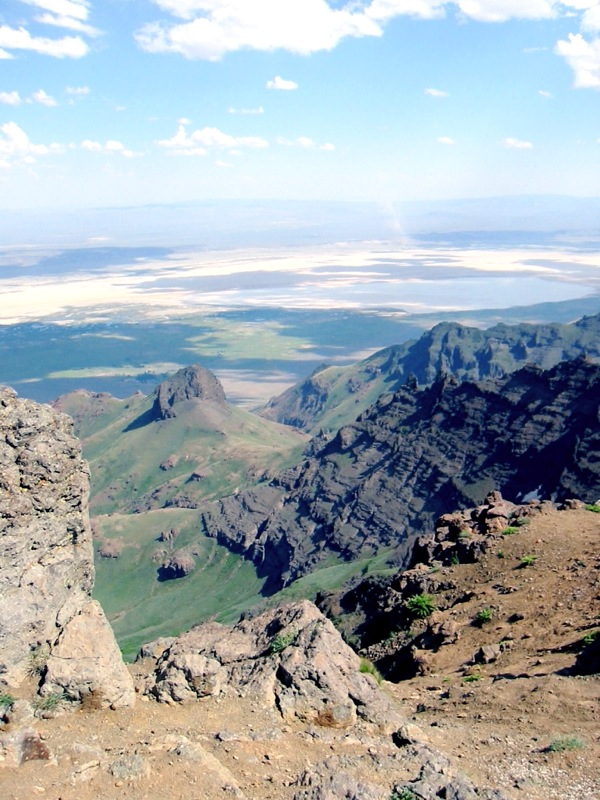
View from the top of Steens Mountain, looking out to Alvord Desert

The Steens Mountain Wilderness is a wilderness area surrounding a portion of Steens Mountain of southeastern Oregon in the United States. The reserve falls within the Steens Mountain Cooperative Management and Protection Area (CMPA). Both the reserve and the CMPA are administered by the Bureau of Land Management. The wilderness area encompasses 170,166 acres (68,864 ha) of the CMPA's total 428,156 acres (173,269 ha). 98,859 acres (40,007 ha) of the Wilderness are protected from grazing and free of cattle.

== Topography ==
The Steens Mountain Wilderness ranges in elevation from 4,200 to 9,733 feet (1,280 to 2,967 m) at the summit of Steens Mountain. The reserve features a variety of vegetative zones, from the arid sagebrush zone in the Alvord Desert, through the western juniper, mountain mahogany, mountain big sagebrush, quaking aspen, subalpine meadow, and subalpine grassland, to the snow cover zone.

Steens Mountain is the largest fault-block mountain in North America. Pressure under the Earth's surface thrust the block upward approximately 20 million years ago, resulting in a steep eastern face with a more gentle slope on the western side of the mountain. During the Ice Age, glaciers carved several deep gorges into the peak and created depressions where Lily, Fish, and Wildhorse lakes now stand.

== Flora ==
Vegetation in the Steens Mountain Wilderness varies greatly according to elevation. Common plants include sagebrush, juniper, various species of bunchgrass, mountain mahogany, aspen, mountain meadow knotweed, and false hellebore. Other vegetation endemic to Steens Mountain includes Steens paintbrush (Castilleja pilosa var. steenensis), moss gentian (Gentiana fremontii), Steens Mountain penstemon (Penstemon davidsonii var. praeteritus), Steens Mountain thistle (Cirsium peckii), a dwarf blue lupine, and Cusick's buckwheat (Eriogonum cusickii).

== Fauna ==
Steens Mountain is home to a variety of wildlife, including bighorn sheep, Rocky Mountain elk, mule deer, pronghorn, sage grouse, coyotes, and the Great Basin redband trout. Cattle can be found in the wilderness as well, though they are excluded from grazing 98,859 acres (40,007 ha) on top of Steens Mountain. The area is also home to mustang herds, including Kiger mustangs.

== See also ==
- Donner und Blitzen River
- List of Oregon Wildernesses
- List of U.S. Wilderness Areas
- Whorehouse Meadow
- Wilderness Act
