= Diamond Craters =

Volcanic field in Oregon, United States

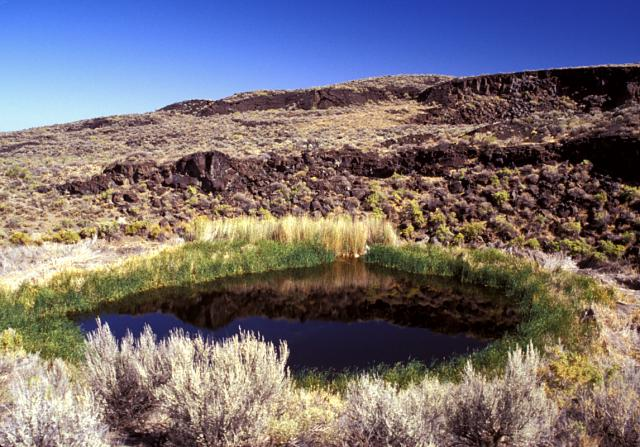
- Malheur Maar, the only lake-filled maar in Diamond Craters

Highest point
- Elevation: 4,707 ft (1,435 m)
- Coordinates: 43°06′N 118°45′W

Geography
- Location within Oregon
- Location: Harney County, Oregon, U.S.
- Parent range: Basin and Range
- Topo map: USGS Diamond Swamp

Geology
- Rock age: 7320 to 7790 calendar years. B.P.
- Mountain type: Volcanic field / shield volcano

Climbing
- Easiest route: roads and trails

The Diamond Craters is a monogenetic volcanic field about 40 miles (64 km) southeast of Burns, Oregon. The field consists of a 27-square-mile (70 km^{2}) area of basaltic lava flows, cinder cones, and maars. The reexamination of radiocarbon dates from older studies and interpretation of paleomagnetic data and new radiocarbon dates limits the eruption of volcanic vents in this volcanic field to the time period between 7320 and 7790 calendar years B.P.

Diamond Craters and the nearby Diamond post office were named after the Diamond Ranch, established in the area by the pioneer Mace McCoy. The ranch used a diamond-shaped brand, hence the name.

In the 1970s, Diamond Craters was a source of controversy between the Bureau of Land Management and commercial stonecutters who were illegally removing slabs of lava to sell as veneer for fireplaces, home exteriors, and chimneys. Geologists familiar with the area cited the craters' unusual research value, a "museum of basaltic volcanic features" apt to be destroyed by slab harvesting and associated heavy equipment. In 1982, the area gained additional protection when it was designated an Outstanding Natural Area.

== Notable vents ==
| Name | Elevation | Coordinates | Last eruption |
| Big Bomb Crater | 1,308 m (4,291 ft) | 43° 04' 34.64" N, 118° 44' 59.13" W | - |
| Central Crater Complex | 1,378 m (4,521 ft) | 43° 05' 38.48" N, 118° 47' 08.53" W | - |
| Cloverleaf Crater | - | 43° 05' 21.54" N, 118° 43' 58.84" W | - |
| Dry Maar | 1,268 m (4,160 ft) | 43° 06' 11.92" N, 118° 49' 04.55" W | - |
| East Twin Crater | 1,326 m (4,350 ft) | 43° 05' 52.83" N, 118° 48' 19.46" W | - |
| Keyhole Explosion Crater | - | 43° 05' 07.30" N, 118° 45' 30.12" W | - |
| Lava Pit Crater | 1,305 m (4,281 ft) | 43° 04' 32.66" N, 118° 45' 24.06" W | - |
| Little Red Cone | - | 43° 06' 11.57" N, 118° 44' 44.17" W | - |
| Malheur Maar | 1,286 m (4,219 ft) | 43° 06' 14.68" N, 118° 48' 59.54" W | - |
| Nolf Crater | - | 43° 06' 26.54" N, 118° 48' 15.60" W | - |
| Oval Crater | - | 43° 04' 56.85" N, 118° 45' 56.88" W | - |
| Red Bomb Crater | 1,323 m (4,341 ft) | 43° 04' 39.94" N, 118° 46' 08.23" W | - |
| West Twin Crater | 1,326 m (4,350 ft) | 43° 05' 56.52" N, 118° 48' 31.70" W | - |

== See also ==
- List of volcanic fields
