= UnRally =

Ticketed festival in Oregon

UnRally is a ticketed gathering on the Alvord Desert playa in southeastern Oregon, United States. Held over four days in June, it combines adventure motorcycling and camping with art and vehicles built by participants. Its format draws on Burning Man.

== History ==
The event was founded by Pete Day. The first gathering took place in 2017, initially under the name "Mosko UNRally". Afterward, the organizers dropped "Mosko" from the name.

The second gathering drew about 95 people under a Bureau of Land Management permit allowing 100 participants. By 2024, attendance was limited to 200.

== Format and activities ==
Organizers ask people not to sell or promote products and to leave the playa clean. They do not schedule classes or group rides. Riders choose their own routes, with maps and GPS tracks available at camp. Participants are expected to bring their own supplies and contribute activities or equipment for others to use. At the 2018 gathering, the camp had toilets and shade. Dinner was available to those who paid ahead.

Temporary installations have included a freestanding red door and an unconnected "help line" telephone. Participants have also brought land sailing craft, trials motorcycles, and other equipment to share.

At the 2024 gathering, vehicles included a motorized sofa called "Chair Force One" and a Toyota Prius rebuilt to resemble a large television. Other participants brought electric skateboards, paramotors, and custom motorcycles.
