= Alvord Hot Springs =

Thermal spring in Oregon

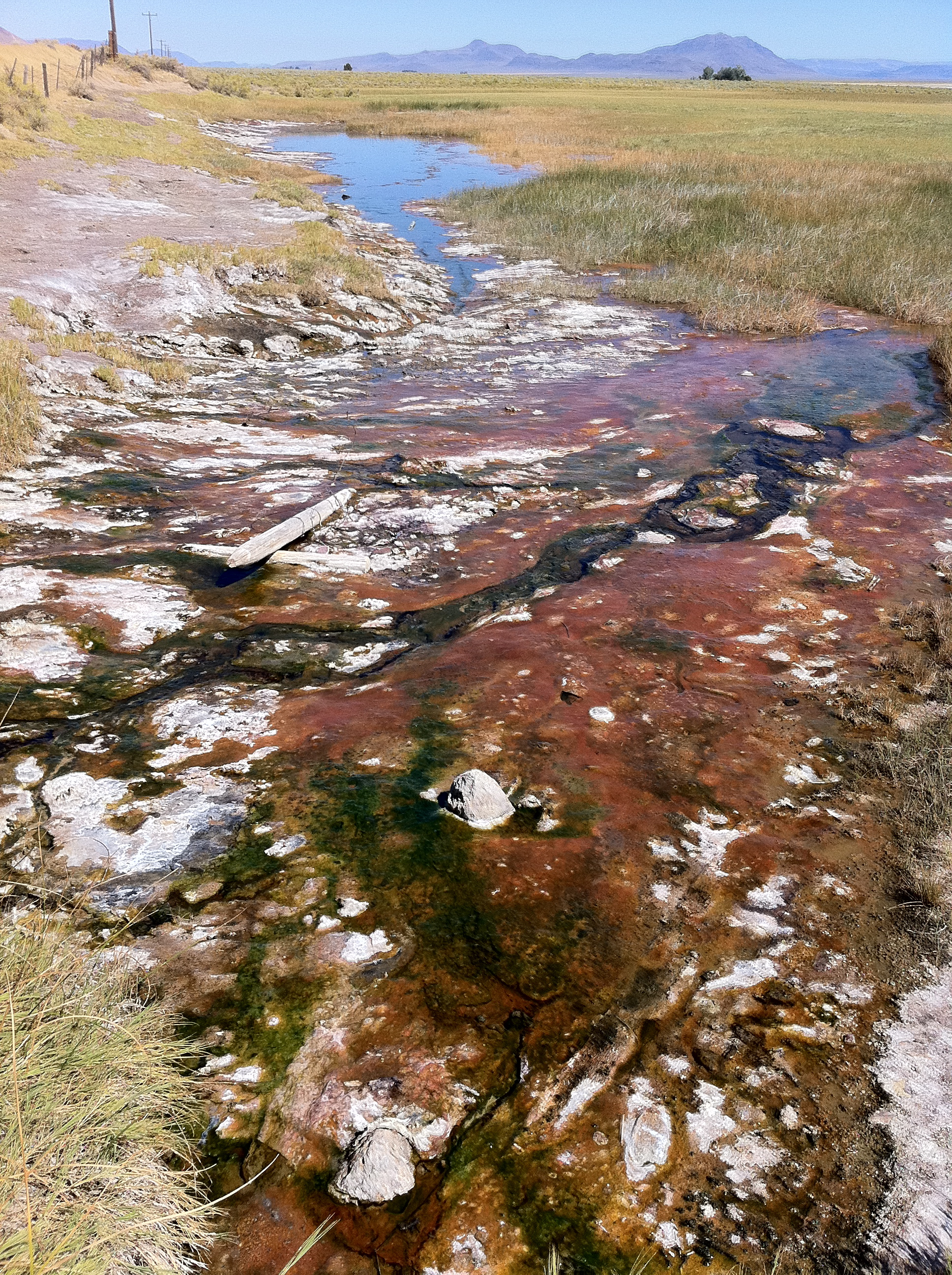
- Algae matts in drainage area

- Location within Oregon
- Interactive map of Alvord Hot Springs
- Location: Harney County, Oregon
- Coordinates: 42°32′39″N 118°32′02″W
- Elevation: 4,078 feet (1,243 m)
- Type: Natural hot spring
- Temperature: 174 °F (79 °C)

Alvord Hot Springs is a geothermal spring located in Harney County in southeastern Oregon in the United States.

== Geography ==
The spring lies at 4,078 feet (1,243 m) elevation on the western edge of the Alvord Desert into which the spring flows and eventually evaporates. To the west of the springs lies Steens Mountain, a north–south running range with a peak of 9,738 ft (2,968 m) above sea level.

== Soaking pools ==
The source averages 174 °F (79 °C), but a system of pipes cools and regulates the flow of incoming water so that the pool temperature is maintained about 105 °F (44 °C). The spring smells somewhat of sulfur, yet not enough to dissuade visitors from soaking in one of two small, man-made rectangular concrete soaking pools, which are 3 feet (1 m) deep and either 25 by 50 feet (7.5 x 15 m) or 10 by 20 (3 x 6 m). The soaking pools have a covered, as well as an open portion, the covered portion being rustic in its corrugated sheet metal and wood construction.

The thermal springs from the Alvord Basin discharge sodium-bicarbonate-chloride-type water with a significant proportion of sulfate.

== Public access ==
Though they are on private property, before 2013, the use of the hot springs was free and open to the public year-round. In early 2013, the property owners (the Alvord Ranch) installed a full-time caretaker in a trailer and started construction of a parking-lot and a small building which will house a store. Access to the hot springs is no longer free. Maintenance is volunteered by local residents and all visitors are encouraged to help keep the springs clean.

== See also ==
- List of hot springs in the United States
