= Jupiter Inlet Light =

Lighthouse in Florida, US

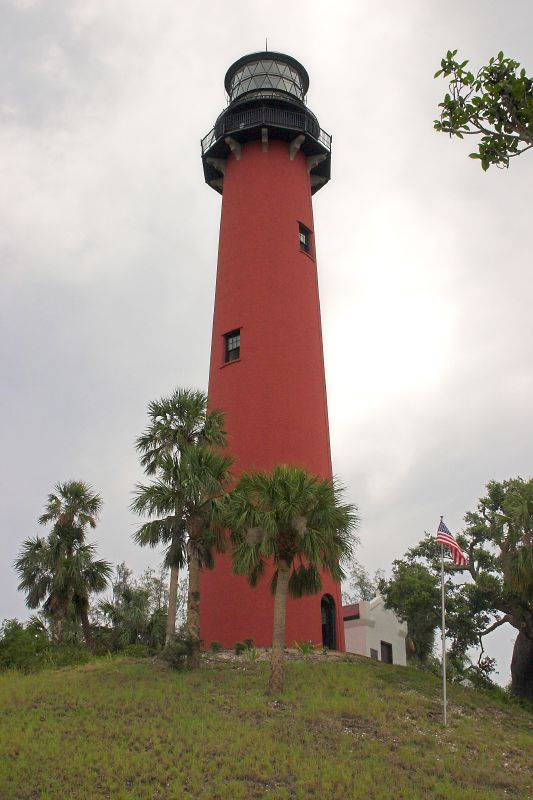
- The Jupiter Inlet Lighthouse
- Location: North side of the Jupiter Inlet in Jupiter, Florida
- Coordinates: 26°56′55″N 80°04′55″W

Tower
- Constructed: 1860
- Foundation: Concrete
- Construction: Brick
- Automated: 1928
- Height: Tower: 105 feet (32 m), above water: 153 feet (47 m)
- Shape: Conical tower/cylindrical tower
- Heritage: National Register of Historic Places listed place, Outstanding Natural Area

Light
- First lit: 1860
- Focal height: 47 m (154 ft)
- Lens: First order Fresnel lens
- Range: 25 nautical miles (46 km; 29 mi)
- Characteristic: Fixed white varied by two white flashes every 30 seconds
- Jupiter Inlet Lighthouse
- U.S. National Register of Historic Places
- Outstanding Natural Area
- Architect: John Nystrem
- NRHP reference No.: 73000597

Significant dates
- Added to NRHP: October 15, 1973
- Designated ONA: May 8, 2008

The Jupiter Inlet Light is a lighthouse located in Jupiter, Florida, on the north side of the Jupiter Inlet. The site for the lighthouse was chosen in 1853. It is located between Cape Canaveral Light and Hillsboro Inlet Light. The lighthouse was designed by then Lieutenant George G. Meade of the Bureau of Topographical Engineers. Meade's design was subsequently modified by Lieutenant William Raynolds. The Jupiter Inlet silted shut in 1854, forcing all building supplies to be shipped in light boats down the Indian River. Work was interrupted from 1856 to 1858 by the Third Seminole War. The lighthouse was completed under the supervision of Captain Edward A. Yorke in 1860 at a cost of more than $60,000.

The lighthouse was built on a hill once thought to be an Indian shell mound or midden (and sometimes falsely rumored to be a burial mound), but which is now determined to be a natural parabolic sand dune. The top of the 105-foot (32 m) tower is 153 feet (47 m) above sea level. The light can be seen 24 nautical miles (44 km; 28 mi) at sea. The lighthouse structure is brick with double masonry walls. The outer wall is conical, tapering from 31.5 inches (800 mm) (eight bricks thick) at ground level to 18 inches (460 mm) (three bricks thick) at base of lantern. The inner wall is cylindrical and two bricks thick throughout. Circumference at base is about 65 feet (20 m) and at the top about 43 feet (13 m). The lighthouse was painted red in 1910 to cover discoloration caused by humidity. Hurricane Jeanne in 2004 sandblasted the paint from the upper portion of the tower, and the tower was repainted using a potassium silicate mineral coating.

== History ==
View of the lighthouse c.1875–1925

The point of land which sits at the junction of the Indian River and Jupiter Inlet for thousands of years had been a meeting place for ancient Indian tribes. This strategic site did not go unnoticed by U.S. Army surveyors who in 1849 recommended the Jupiter Inlet area as a suitable place for military defenses. President Franklin Pierce signed the order to set aside a 61½-acre site on the Fort Jupiter Reservation for a lighthouse in 1854.

The lighthouse was initially designed by Lieutenant George Gordon Meade. Later, Lt. William Raynolds, who succeeded Meade as head of the 4th and 7th Lighthouse Districts, improved the strength of the lighthouse with a double wall design. The lighthouse and oil house construction was accomplished by Captain Edward Yorke, who arrived December 31, 1859 and completed the tower in May 1860. It was lit July 10, 1860.

A Weather Bureau station and signal station were established on the lighthouse grounds in 1889. Passing ships were signaled during the day by semaphore (flags) and at night by flares. In 1890 the Naval wireless telegraph station was established on the Reservation. It was not until 1925 that it was discovered that a mistake had been made on the original survey; the Lighthouse Reservation actually covered 113.22 acres. In 1930 the acreage was increased to 121.95 and held the tower, a keeper's house, a radio beacon, power house and several outbuildings. In 1917 the lighthouse was transfer from the Department of Commerce to the Navy for the duration of the first world war.

The U.S. Navy acquired 8.4 acres of the Reservation from the US Government and by 1936 the Navy was operating a Radio Compass Station at Jupiter as an aid to navigation. The station broadcast weather information and monitored distress signals as well as naval ship-to-shore and aircraft frequencies. On July 1, 1939 all US lighthouses became the responsibility of the U.S. Coast Guard. In the same year, the US Navy established an Intelligence Listening Post at the Naval Radio Station and constructed the barracks building for naval personnel and their families.

By July 1940, the Navy's Radio Detection Finding Station, known as "Station J", came online. This secret installation was designed to intercept German U-boat radio messages and warn Allied ships and help US forces attack enemy vessels. Station J was able to pinpoint the names and locations of the submarines. In May 1943, 30 German submarines were destroyed, and in June another 37. Most had been located by the men of Station J.

== Jupiter Inlet Lighthouse and Museum ==
Entry sign at the museum

On January 11, 1972, the Loxahatchee River Historical Society (LRHS) was founded to preserve the area's history and it opened the Oil House Museum in June 1973. Public tours were conducted periodically by permission of the U.S. Coast Guard. On November 15, of the same year, the Lighthouse was placed on the National Register of Historic Places. By 1988, the Society had opened the Florida History Center and Museum in Burt Reynolds Park just across the inlet.

The LRHS entered into an agreement with the Coast Guard to maintain and insure the Jupiter Inlet Lighthouse and to conduct regular public tours to the top of the lighthouse for the first time in 1994. The LRHS operated a small visitor center in the east end of the last remaining building of Station J, once used as living quarters for the military.

The LRHS, with a grant from the Florida Department of Transportation and in cooperation with the Town of Jupiter and the U.S. Coast Guard, started a major restoration project in 1999 to repair weather damage to the tower. It was completed in April 2000.

In 2006, in an agreement between the LRHS, Palm Beach County, and Town of Jupiter, the old World War II building in Lighthouse Park was renovated to become the new home of the Loxahatchee River Historical Society. On December 7, 2006, the history museum and society headquarters moved from Burt Reynolds Park to Lighthouse Park to become the Jupiter Inlet Lighthouse and Museum. The LRHS also entered into a 30-year lease agreement with the U.S. Coast Guard to maintain and operate a larger portion of the land between the tower and the western fence line of the US Coast Guard property in order to set up outdoor history exhibits. Operations for the lighthouse and history museum are now in one location.

The Loxahatchee River Historical Society today operates the Jupiter Inlet Lighthouse and Museum. The museum is located in Lighthouse Park, 500 Captain Armour's Way, Jupiter, Florida. Check the official website for current hours of operation. Visitors can climb the lighthouse tower and visit the History Museum by registering for admission through the gift shop.

== Jupiter Inlet Lighthouse Outstanding Natural Area ==
Lookout at Jupiter Inlet Lighthouse ONA

The Jupiter Inlet Lighthouse Outstanding Natural Area (JILONA) Act was introduced into the Senate by Senator Bill Nelson and co-sponsored by Senator Mel Martinez. It was introduced into the United States House of Representatives by Congressman Tim Mahoney and co-sponsored by Congressmen Ron Klein and Alcee Hastings. This legislation designates the lighthouse and 120 surrounding acres of sensitive habitat as an Outstanding Natural Area (ONA) in the Department of the Interior, Bureau of Land Management's (BLM) National Landscape Conservation System.

The JILONA site is the first Outstanding Natural Area (ONA) in the nation east of the Pacific Coast. Two other ONAs also protect lighthouses: Yaquina Head in Oregon and Piedras Blancas Lighthouse in California. The Congressional Bill was signed by President George W. Bush on May 8, 2008, protecting this site for all Americans in perpetuity.

The JILONA is cooperatively managed by the Bureau of Land Management, and local partners: Palm Beach County, Town of Jupiter, Village of Tequesta, Loxahatchee River Historical Society, U.S. Coast Guard and Jupiter High School's Environmental Research and Field Studies Academy. Over the last decade, the group has accomplished many projects including lighthouse restoration, wetland reconstruction, river slope stabilization following hurricanes Frances and Jeanne, fuel hazard reduction and habitat improvement for endangered species, and proving the Jupiter Inlet Working Group a successful partnership. For safeguarding Jupiter Inlet's ecological integrity and cultural heritage, the Jupiter Inlet Working Group was given the Cooperative Conservation Award from the Department of the Interior in April, 2008.

== Gallery ==
View from the lighthouse of the Indian River to the north, c.1875–1925

View of Jupiter Inlet to the east, c.1875–1925

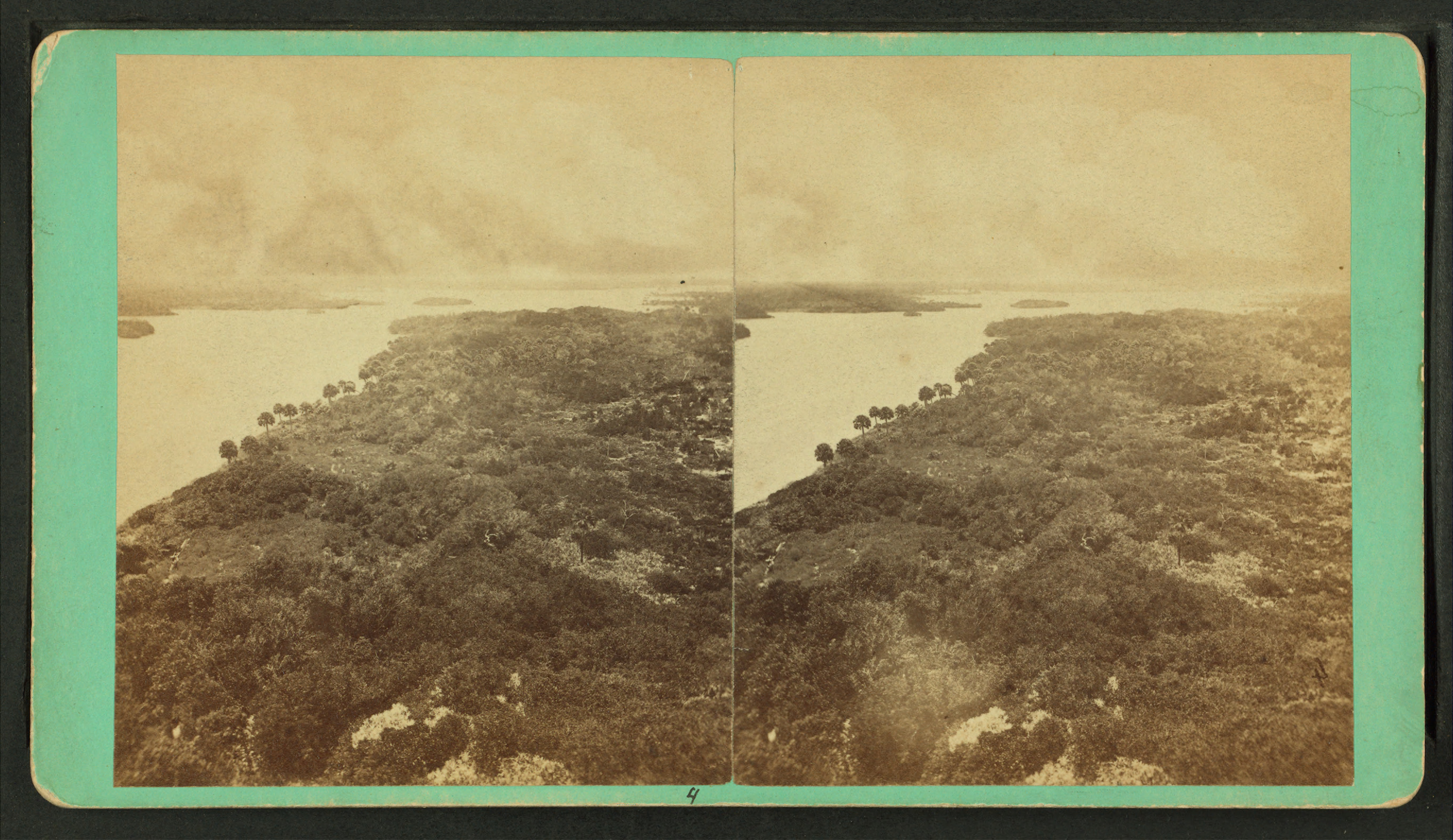
View of the Loxahatchee River to the west, c.1875–1925

View of Jupiter Inlet (2010)

View of the Loxahatchee River (2012)

View of the lighthouse at night

Video of the lantern room

Station panorama
