= Valsetz, Oregon =

Ghost town in Oregon, United States

Coordinates: 44.83833°N 123.65389°W

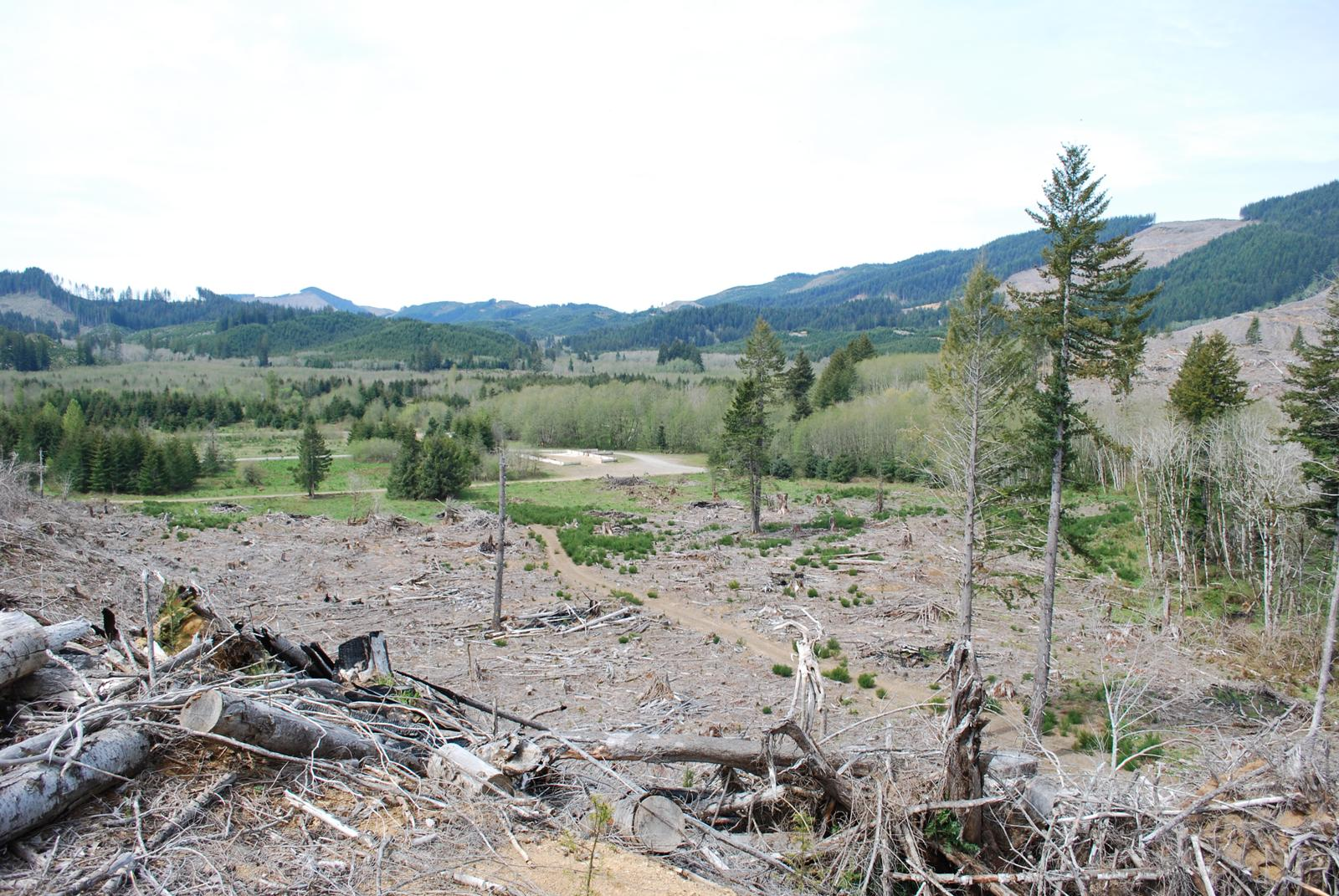
Overlooking the former site of Valsetz in 2009

Valsetz was an unincorporated community and timber company town in Polk County, Oregon, United States, west of Falls City in the Central Oregon Coast Range. It no longer exists.

== History ==
Oregon Geographic Names says that the William W. Mitchell Company started the town in 1919 and named it as a portmanteau of Valley and Siletz Railroad, whose terminus was at that location. Company town researcher Linda Carlson says the town was founded by the Cobbs & Mitchell company of Cadillac, Michigan during World War I. Valsetz post office was established in 1920.

In 1947, Cobbs & Mitchell sold the town to its sales agent, Herbert Templeton. He operated it as the Valsetz Lumber Company until 1959, when its sawmill and timber stands were sold to the Boise Cascade Corporation.

After the depletion of the old growth timber in the area in the 1970s, the railroad was torn up.

In 1983, Boise Cascade announced that all operations at Valsetz would end early the next year. At that time, the town's population was about 300. In 1984, the town and most of its structures were removed, as everything in the community, property and streets included, was owned by the corporation. The post office closed the same year. The site became part of the Valsetz Tree Farm.

Valsetz Lake, an artificial lake next to the townsite that was formed by damming the South Fork Siletz River, was drained in 1988.

== Legacy ==
Former residents of Valsetz gather for an annual reunion in Falls City, which is the site of a Valsetz memorial.

The place was nationally known for its record rainfalls and for its newspaper, the Valsetz Star, which was started in the 1930s by 9-year-old Dorothy Anne Hobson. At one time the population of Valsetz was over one thousand, and served by its own elementary and high school, which fielded championship basketball teams.

Near the site of the former community is the "Valley of the Giants", 51 acres (210,000 m^{2}) of Bureau of Land Management-protected old growth Douglas-fir and Western Hemlock forest on the North Fork of the Siletz River. The valley was set aside for protection in 1976.

The Valsetz Dining Hall at Western Oregon University (WOU) in Monmouth, east of Valsetz, was built in 1970 and rededicated in 1991 in tribute to the former community. Between 1926 and 1931, WOU, then known as the Oregon Normal School, sent 16 to 20 student teachers for six-week sessions in the Valsetz elementary school.

== Climate ==
This region experiences warm (but not hot) and dry summers, with no average monthly temperatures above 71.6 °F. According to the Köppen Climate Classification system, Valsetz has a warm-summer Mediterranean climate, abbreviated "Csb" on climate maps.

Climate data for Valsetz, Oregon (1160 ft)
Month	Jan	Feb	Mar	Apr	May	Jun	Jul	Aug	Sep	Oct	Nov	Dec	Year
Mean daily maximum °F (°C)	45.3 (7.4)	49.8 (9.9)	52.5 (11.4)	57.9 (14.4)	65.3 (18.5)	71.4 (21.9)	77.6 (25.3)	77.5 (25.3)	72.9 (22.7)	63.5 (17.5)	52.4 (11.3)	46.7 (8.2)	61.1 (16.2)
Daily mean °F (°C)	38.3 (3.5)	41.7 (5.4)	43.2 (6.2)	46.8 (8.2)	52.4 (11.3)	57.9 (14.4)	62.1 (16.7)	62.5 (16.9)	58.6 (14.8)	51.7 (10.9)	44.1 (6.7)	40.1 (4.5)	50.0 (10.0)
Mean daily minimum °F (°C)	31.4 (−0.3)	33.6 (0.9)	33.9 (1.1)	35.8 (2.1)	39.6 (4.2)	44.5 (6.9)	46.6 (8.1)	47.5 (8.6)	44.4 (6.9)	40.0 (4.4)	35.9 (2.2)	33.6 (0.9)	38.9 (3.8)
Average precipitation inches (mm)	20.70 (526)	16.68 (424)	14.91 (379)	8.58 (218)	4.72 (120)	3.17 (81)	1.08 (27)	1.83 (46)	4.53 (115)	10.33 (262)	19.17 (487)	22.31 (567)	128.01 (3,252)
Average snowfall inches (cm)	8.2 (21)	2.6 (6.6)	4.0 (10)	0.9 (2.3)	0.0 (0.0)	0.0 (0.0)	0.0 (0.0)	0.0 (0.0)	0.0 (0.0)	0.1 (0.25)	1.3 (3.3)	4.3 (11)	21.4 (54.45)
Source: DRI

== Education ==
Valsetz was served by the Valsetz School which was a public school for 1st through 12th grade students. In 1969 the high school had 31 students, making it one of the smallest high school programs in Oregon. High school graduation for the last class was held May 25, 1984 and Senator Mark Hatfield spoke at the event.

== See also ==
- List of ghost towns in Oregon
