= Thermophile =

Organism that thrives at relatively high temperatures

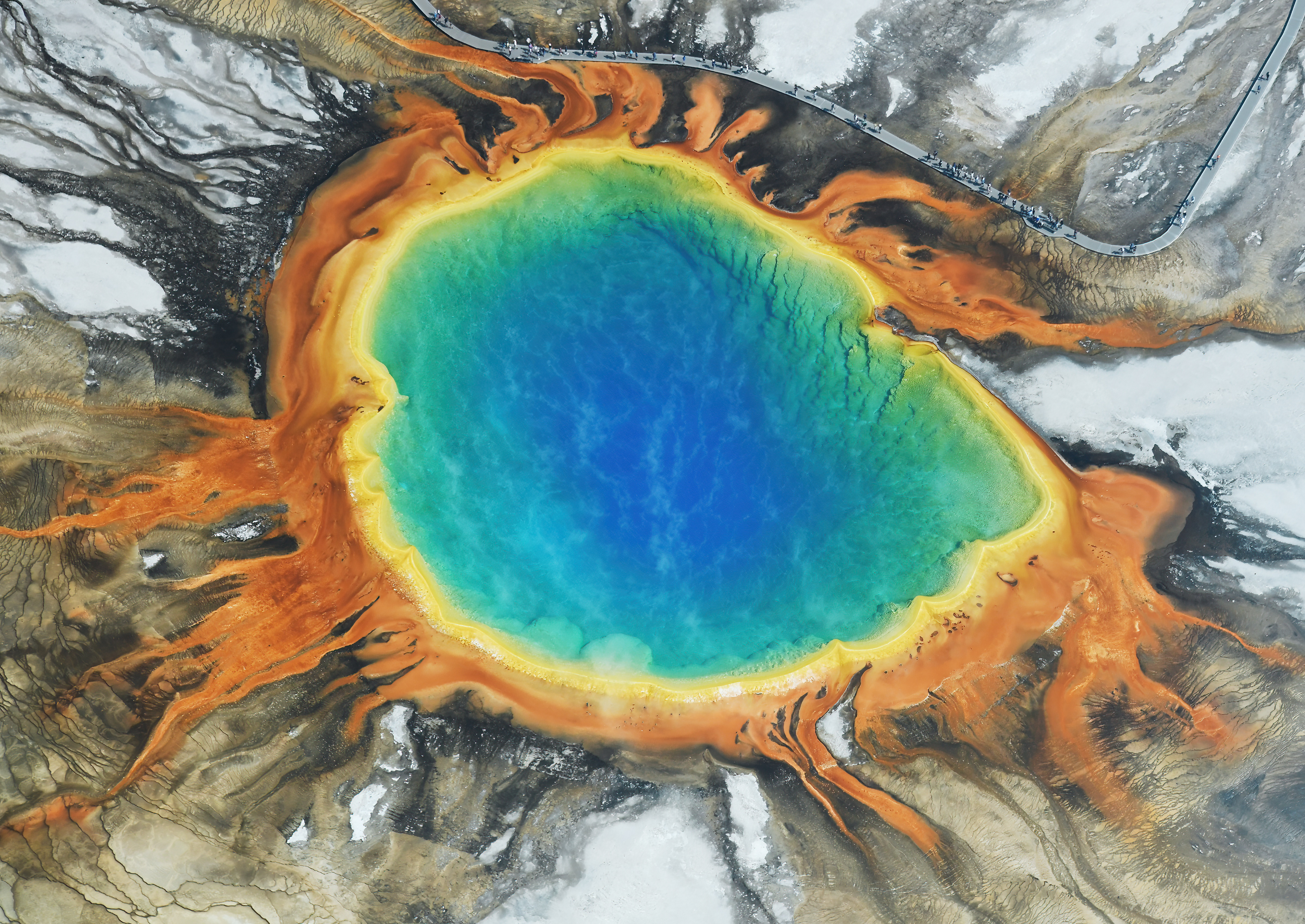
Thermophiles produce some of the bright colors of Grand Prismatic Spring, Yellowstone National Park

A thermophile is a type of extremophile that thrives at relatively high temperatures, between 41 and 122 °C (106 and 252 °F). Many thermophiles are archaea, though some of them are bacteria and fungi. Thermophilic bacteria are suggested to have been among the earliest bacteria.

Thermophiles are found in geothermally heated regions of the Earth, such as hot springs like those in Yellowstone National Park and deep sea hydrothermal vents, as well as decaying plant matter, such as peat bogs and compost. They can live at high temperatures, whereas other bacteria or archaea would be damaged and sometimes killed if exposed to the same temperatures.

The enzymes in thermophiles function at high temperatures. Some of these enzymes are used in molecular biology, for example the Taq polymerase used in PCR. "Thermophile" is derived from Greek: θέρμη, romanized: thérmē "heat", and Greek: φιλία, romanized: philía "love".

Comparative surveys suggest that thermophile diversity is principally driven by pH, not temperature.

== Classification ==
Thermophiles can be classified in various ways. One classification sorts these organisms according to their optimal growth temperatures:

1. Simple thermophiles: 50–64 °C (122–147 °F)
2. Extreme thermophiles 65–79 °C (149–174 °F)
3. Hyperthermophiles 80 °C (176 °F) and beyond, but not below 50 °C (122 °F)

In a related classification, thermophiles are sorted as follows:

1. Facultative thermophiles (also called moderate thermophiles) can thrive at high temperatures, but also at lower temperatures (below 50 °C (122 °F)), whereas
2. Obligate thermophiles (also called extreme thermophiles) require such high temperatures for growth.
3. Hyperthermophiles are particularly extreme thermophiles for which the optimal temperatures are above 80 °C (176 °F).

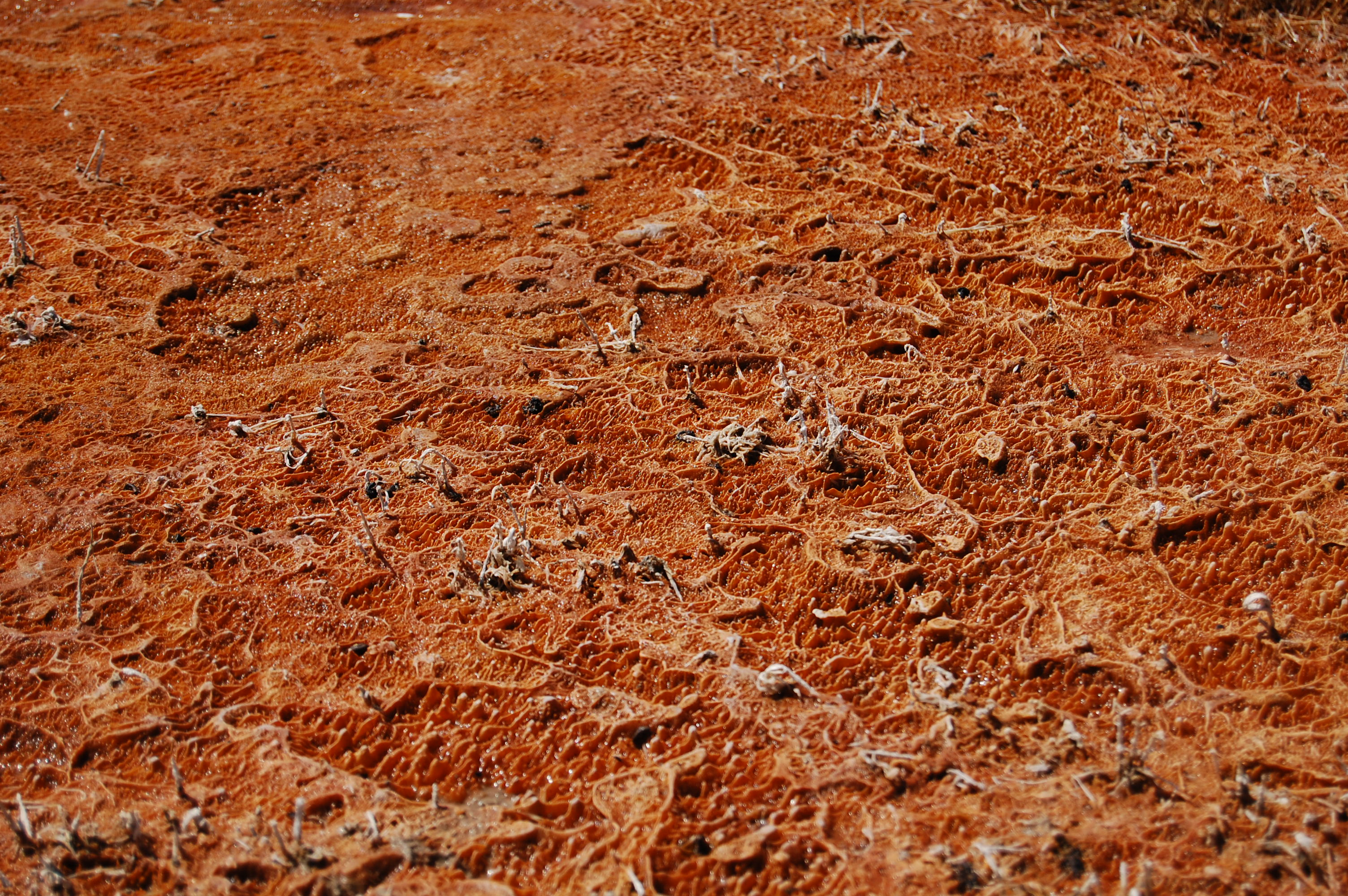
A colony of thermophiles in the outflow of Mickey Hot Springs, Oregon, the water temperature is approximately 60 °C (140 °F).

Many hyperthermophilic Archaea require elemental sulfur for growth. Some are anaerobes that use the sulfur instead of oxygen as an electron acceptor during anaerobic cellular respiration. Some are lithotrophs that oxidize sulphur to create sulfuric acid as an energy source, thus requiring the microorganism to be adapted to very low pH (i.e., it is an acidophile as well as thermophile). These organisms are inhabitants of hot, sulfur-rich environments usually associated with volcanism, such as hot springs, geysers, and fumaroles. In these places, especially in Yellowstone National Park, zonation of microorganisms according to their temperature optima occurs. These organisms are often colored, due to the presence of photosynthetic pigments.

== Thermophile versus mesophile ==
Thermophiles can be discriminated from mesophiles from genomic features. For example, the GC-content levels in the coding regions of some signature genes were consistently identified as correlated with the temperature range condition when the association analysis was applied to mesophilic and thermophilic organisms regardless of their phylogeny, oxygen requirement, salinity, or habitat conditions.

== Fungal thermophiles ==
Fungi are the only group of organisms in the Eukaryota domain that can survive at temperature ranges of 50–60 °C. Thermophilic fungi have been reported from a number of habitats, with most of them belonging to the fungal order Sordariales. Thermophilic fungi have great biotechnological potential due to their ability to produce industrial-relevant thermostable enzymes, in particular for the degradation of plant biomass.

== Gene transfer and genetic exchange ==
Sulfolobus solfataricus and Sulfolobus acidocaldarius are hyperthermophilic Archaea. When these organisms are exposed to the DNA damaging agents UV irradiation, bleomycin or mitomycin C, species-specific cellular aggregation is induced. In S. acidocaldarius, UV-induced cellular aggregation mediates chromosomal marker exchange with high frequency. Recombination rates exceed those of uninduced cultures by up to three orders of magnitude. Frols et al. and Ajon et al.(2011) hypothesized that cellular aggregation enhances species-specific DNA transfer between Sulfolobus cells in order to provide increased repair of damaged DNA by means of homologous recombination. Van Wolferen et al., in discussing DNA exchange in the hyperthermophiles under extreme conditions, noted that DNA exchange likely plays a role in repair of DNA via homologous recombination. They suggested that this process is crucial under DNA damaging conditions such as high temperature. Also it has been suggested that DNA transfer in Sulfolobus may be a primitive form of sexual interaction similar to the more well-studied bacterial transformation systems that are associated with species-specific DNA transfer between cells leading to homologous recombinational repair of DNA damage.

== In science ==
Thermus aquaticus is historically important. Its discovery pushed forward the maximum temperature in which it was believed any organism could grow, and its heat-resistant DNA polymerase enabled it to develop an efficient way to multiply DNA quickly without the enzyme being denatured, a key step in the amelioration of PCR tests.

== See also ==
- Mesophile
- Psychrophile
- Anaerobic digestion
