= Alvord Desert =

Desert in southeastern Oregon

- Dry lake
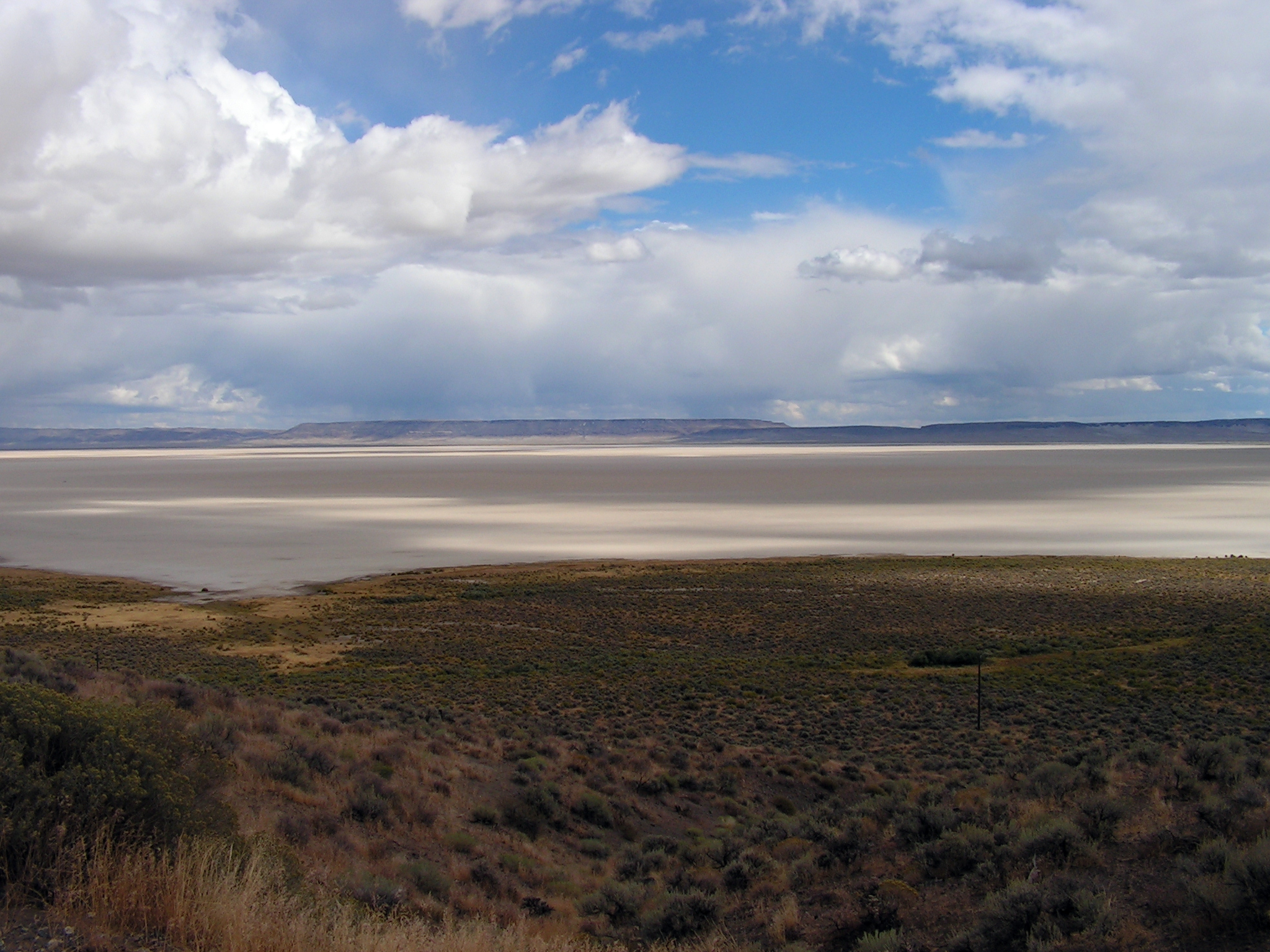
- View of Alvord Desert from the west

- Location within Oregon Location within the United States
- Coordinates: 42.53°N 118.46°W
- Location: Oregon, United States

Area
  - Total: 84 sq mi (220 km^{2})
- Bordered by: Steens Mountain, Mickey Butte, Pueblo Valley and Tule Springs Rim

The Alvord Desert is a dry lake in Harney County, southeastern Oregon, at the eastern foot of Steens Mountain. The mountain rises more than a mile above the playa. Streams flow onto the playa, but the basin has no outlet. The water evaporates, leaving salt minerals on the surface.

The playa can flood in wet periods but is dry for much of the year. When dry, its broad, flat surface is used for land sailing, glider flying, motoring, and camping. Researchers have also used the playa to study dust devils and test sensors for future Mars exploration. More than 35 sq mi (91 km^{2}) of the playa lie within the Alvord Desert Wilderness Study Area.

== Name ==
The desert is named after General Benjamin Alvord, who served as commander of the U.S. Army's Department of Oregon during the American Civil War.

== Indigenous history ==
The Wadatika, a Northern Paiute band, spent part of late summer and early fall in the Alvord Desert and wintered near Malheur Lake. The Burns Paiute Tribe says its members are primarily descendants of the Wadatika.

A 1975 survey of the wider Alvord Basin recorded 224 archaeological sites and 217 identifiable stone points. Some points found around the Alvord Desert playa were dated by style to about 8000 to 5000 BCE, when researchers believed it held a lake. Smaller points thought to be arrowheads from roughly the past 2,000 years were found on an alluvial fan at the playa's north edge.

== Climate ==
The Alvord Desert experiences a cold desert climate (Köppen BWk). The area receives very little rainfall throughout the year due to the rain shadow created by the Coast and Cascade mountain ranges as well the adjacent Steens Mountain. A 2008 U.S. Geological Survey report estimated mean annual precipitation in the Alvord Desert at less than 4 inches (100 mm).

=== Winter ===
Winter temperatures in the Alvord Basin are moderated through airflow from the south that stops the temperature from dropping too heavily. While many areas in the Oregon High Desert frequently dip below 0 °F (−18 °C) through the winter months, the Alvord Desert rarely sees these frigid temperatures. On average, highs will commonly reach between 40 and 50 °F (4 and 10 °C), with a few rare instances where the temperature fails to break 32 °F (0 °C). At night, the temperature falls to between 20 and 30 °F (−7 and −1 °C), but will not normally fall much further unless Arctic air masses arrive. The basin sees a moderate amount of its rainfall in the winter months from storms coming off the Pacific Ocean while the strong winter jet stream is aimed at the Pacific Northwest. Storms that are strong enough to bring moisture to the southeastern area of Oregon are usually related to tropical storms feeding from the Hawaiian Islands. Snow does sometimes occur in the rare instances when cold air from the Arctic to the north meets a strong flow of moisture from the Pacific to the West.

=== Spring ===
Spring is when the bulk of precipitation falls from thunderstorms. These storms are attributed to the rainfall in April, May, and June that form in the south and move their way north across the desert and surrounding sagebrush plains. Clear nights continue to bring cold overnight temperatures which commonly drop to between 30 and 45 °F (−1 and 7 °C), but afternoon warming raises temperatures to between 50 and 60 °F (10 and 16 °C) in early spring and 70 and 80 °F (21 and 27 °C) in late spring. This warming can help trigger thunderstorms in combination with the unstable spring atmosphere. Extremes in temperature can still be seen at this time of year where temperatures have fallen to 0 to 10 °F (−18 to −12 °C) in March, and climbed to over 100 °F (38 °C) in early June. Rainfall turns the playa into a small lake, and for a short time, makes travel across it difficult.

=== Summer ===
Summer in the Alvord Desert has some of the hottest temperatures in the state of Oregon. High pressure sets in over the Pacific Northwest and the jet stream pushes north into Canada. This high pressure means very little precipitation, averaging less than 1 inch (2.5 cm) throughout the summer months. Late day heat begins to set in by late June where highs reach between 85 and 90 °F (29 and 32 °C). In July the temperature commonly climbs to between 90 and 100 °F (32 and 38 °C). Night-time lows vary, with overnight temperatures dropping down between 60 and 65 °F (16 and 18 °C) throughout much of the basin. In some locations temperatures will only drop to between 65 and 70 °F (18 and 21 °C). August remains hot with highs ranging between 90 and 100 °F (32 and 38 °C) and lows between 50 and 60 °F (10 and 16 °C), though dropping towards the end of the month.

=== Fall ===
Fall is moderate with high temperatures ranging between 60 and 80 °F (16 and 27 °C) and lows between 40 and 50 °F (4 and 10 °C). Fall is also one of the driest times of the year.

== Geology ==
Faulting lowered the basin that holds the Alvord playa. Most movement on the Steens Mountain Fault appears to have occurred between 12 and 10 million years ago. Streams flow into the playa, but the water has no outlet and evaporates, leaving salt minerals on the surface.

Three primary geothermal areas are along the western edge as well as cold springs following NE to SW trending normal faults. On the western edge of the desert is Alvord Hot Springs (42.5440°N 118.5340°W). At the north is Mickey Hot Springs (42.6781°N 118.3467°W): an assortment of bubbling mud, pools and, the occasional geyser. Hot spring activity at Mickey Springs dates back more than 30,000 years. A 2021 study concluded that some springs continued flowing after Lake Alvord submerged them. At the south is Borax Lake (42.3269°N 118.6028°W) which is a thermal spring complex. To the east is an unnamed natural hot spring, one of 40 or more along 25 miles (40 km) of the Alvord fault. To the southwest is seasonal alkali Alvord Lake. During the late Pleistocene, a much larger lake covered the playa. At its highest level, it was more than 80 miles (130 km) long and up to 280 feet (85 m) deep. About 13,000 years ago, the lake breached Big Sand Gap and sent several cubic miles of water into the Coyote Lake basin. The flood eventually reached the Owyhee River and the Snake River, carving canyons and leaving boulders as much as 100 feet (30 m) above present-day river channels. Several of the geothermal features in Alvord Desert Basin have been examined by a team of scientists and geologists from the University of Idaho, Boise State University, and Idaho State University.

== Fauna ==
Despite the barren nature of the playa, some opportunities for wildlife observation exist. Wild horses sometimes drink from the springs on the eastern edge of the desert. In areas where natural hot springs flow into the playa, especially around the Alvord Hot Springs, one can usually find nesting long-billed curlew. Further out into the playa proper are numerous killdeer and snowy plover, along with the occasional American avocet. A 1980 survey counted 67 adult snowy plovers in the Alvord Basin, including 28 at Alvord Hot Spring and 15 at Alvord Lake. The birds were found on bare or sparsely vegetated alkaline ground near water. The outlet waters from the springs typically flow roughly one mile into the desert, and their reach roughly delineates the bird habitat. Long-nosed leopard lizards also live in the Alvord Basin. A 2006 study found relatively high numbers around dry lake beds and salt flats where greasewood was the dominant shrub. Their abundance declined as total shrub cover and sagebrush cover increased.

Western Washington University biologist Roger Anderson also led a three-week summer field school in the desert. By 2014, the program had run for 15 years and focused on lizard ecology and behavior.

The nearby Steens Mountain Wilderness contains populations of bighorn sheep, mule deer, elk, and pronghorn. Further west is the Malheur National Wildlife Refuge, which is popular for birding.

== Conservation and land management ==
More than 35 sq mi (91 km^{2}) of the Alvord playa lies within the Alvord Desert Wilderness Study Area, a mostly federally managed area with scattered private inholdings. In a 1991 study, the Bureau of Land Management found outstanding opportunities for solitude and primitive recreation in the wider study area and identified the playa as a main destination for day hikes. The report counted 70 split-estate parcels across the wider study area, where BLM managed the surface but others held the mineral rights. It recommended leaving the playa outside the proposed wilderness boundary because vehicles had long used it and it had many access points.

A 2005 BLM plan noted that vehicle use on the playa predated the Federal Land Policy and Management Act of 1976 and kept the playa open to vehicles. It found that this did not prevent Congress from designating the playa as wilderness, but vehicles would no longer be allowed if that happened.

BLM designated the Alvord Desert Area of Critical Environmental Concern (ACEC) in 1983. It covers 21,615 acres (8,747 ha) east of the playa but includes only a small part of the lakebed. The ACEC lies almost entirely within the Alvord Desert and East Alvord wilderness study areas. BLM cited the area's dunes, playa margins, desert plant communities and scenery as reasons for protecting it. In 2005, BLM expanded the ACEC by 3,682 acres and limited vehicles within it to designated routes.

== Geothermal and mineral exploration ==
In a 1973-75 survey of western playas, the U.S. Geological Survey measured 12 ppm lithium in one sediment sample from Alvord Lake. The report said the relationship between surface sediment and underground brine concentrations was unclear.

Chevron Oil drilled holes in the Alvord Desert near Fields in 1976 to measure underground temperatures. A 1980 state report described a broad zone of low electrical resistance around the playa. It said saline water and saltly sediment beneath the playa floor were the likely cause.

A 1980 U.S. Geological Survey report recorded about 2 mg/L of lithium in water samples from Alvord Hot Springs.

In 2022, Reedy Lagoon Corporation staked lithium claims on the southern playa, but dropped the project after BLM said a 2000 Steens Mountain mineral withdrawal barred new claims there. The company reported 150 ppm lithium in a sediment sample from its southern claim block and planned electrical surveys to look for buried brines.

== Recreation and scientific research ==
Land yachts on the Alvord Desert playa

The playa's broad, hard surface is used for land sailing, with three-wheeled craft powered by sails. The Bureau of Land Management also lists glider flying, land kiteboarding, and camping among common uses of the playa. Some organized activities, including vehicle rallies, concerts, light shows, and other large gatherings, require a permit.

Visitors can reach the playa without a fee from East Steens Road via Frog Springs Access Road, where the BLM maintains a vault toilet. Alvord Hot Springs was free to use until 2013, when the ranch began charging for soaking. It now has campsites and converted military bunkhouses, and overnight guests can take a private road onto the playa.

In 2016, Oregon Field Guide reported that 20 to 30 glider pilots gathered on the playa for one week each year. Instead of airplane tows, the pilots use cables attached to cars to launch from the dry lake bed. By 2019, the Willamette Valley Soaring Club had made the Alvord trip almost every year since the club was founded in 1960. Pilots use the desert's stronger, more turbulent winds and larger thermals.

Flight archer Alan Case and his daughters use the playa for annual summer training trips. Its open terrain allows them to test handmade bows and arrows over distances exceeding a mile.

A campsite beneath the stars on the Alvord Desert.

On clear nights, the Milky Way is visible from the playa, which is used for stargazing and night-sky photography. A 2025 episode of Oregon Field Guide filmed amateur astronomer Nico Ferguson on the Alvord as he used a small telescope to photograph the Andromeda Galaxy.

Researchers also use the playa to study dust devils, which are common on its surface and have counterparts on Mars. In June 2024, a team led by Boise State University physicist Brian Jackson deployed a grid of wind sensors and weather stations to record passing vortices. Teams have also measured them with drones.

The playa is a field site for NASA's HeliHabitable project. A Colgate University team working with the Jet Propulsion Laboratory flew drones over a hot-spring plume on the playa to test whether sensors on future Mars helicopters could detect water beneath dry soil. Thermal cameras detected subsurface flow after the surface appeared dry.

== Motoring ==
Automobile races were planned on the playa as early as 1918, as part of a dance and barbecue at Alvord Ranch. Announcing the event, the Times-Herald described the desert as "the finest natural auto race course in the world".

In 1925, a Sunday Oregonian feature described a car crossing more than 20 miles (32 km) of the playa's hard, white surface and called it "as smooth as a dancing floor". A 1928 motorlog recounted a Hupmobile reaching 60 mph (97 km/h) on the playa before its driver realized how fast he was going.

In 1930, Oregon state senator J. D. Billingsley said that, with several million dollars, he would buy Alvord Ranch and build highways to it from Burns and Winnemucca. He suggested a 50-mile (80 km) automobile course and would promote the site as "the greatest racetrack for automobiles and airplanes in the world".

In a 1977 oral history, George Renwick recalled that drivers once crossed the dry playa toward Mosquito Creek before a road was built around the Alvord. He called the crossing "the best road Harney County ever had". A stretch of East Steens Road along the mountain side of the basin is a county-maintained gravel road.

The previous women's Land Speed Record was set at Alvord Desert by Kitty O'Neil, in the jet-powered SMI Motivator, in 1976. O'Neil reached 512.710 mph (825.127 km/h).

On August 27, 2019, Jessi Combs died while making back and forth runs at Alvord Desert in an attempt to break O'Neil's record, and in June 2020, Guinness World Records recognized Combs' runs on that date as the official new world record of 522.783 mph (841.338 km/h).

The UnRally is a four-day, noncommercial gathering held on the playa in June. It centers on adventure motorcycles and camping and is capped at 100 participants under its BLM permit. The name refers to the event's lack of scheduled group rides, classes, vendors, raffles, and other usual rally programming. Organizers have drawn on Burning Man's emphasis on participation, self-reliance, and leaving no trace. The camp has included temporary installations such as a freestanding red door, an unconnected telephone, and land-sailing equipment.

== Gallery ==
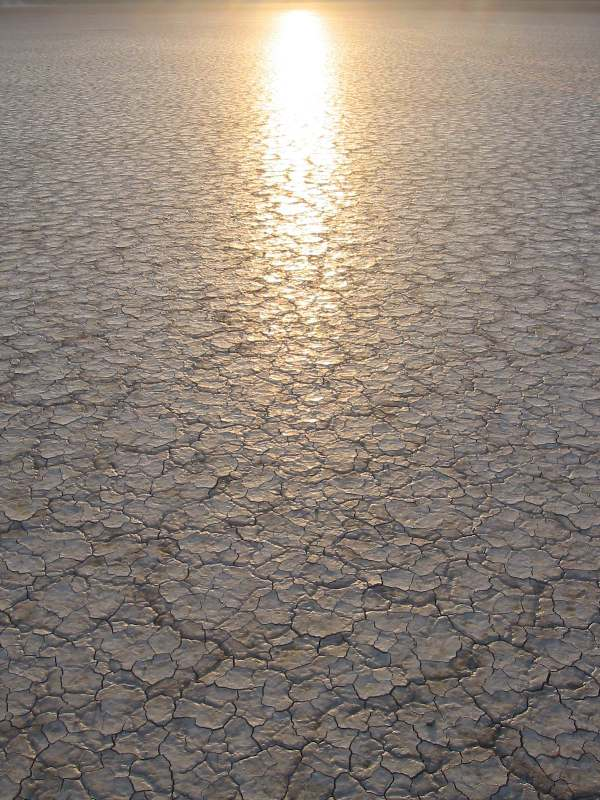
Setting sun reflected off the playa

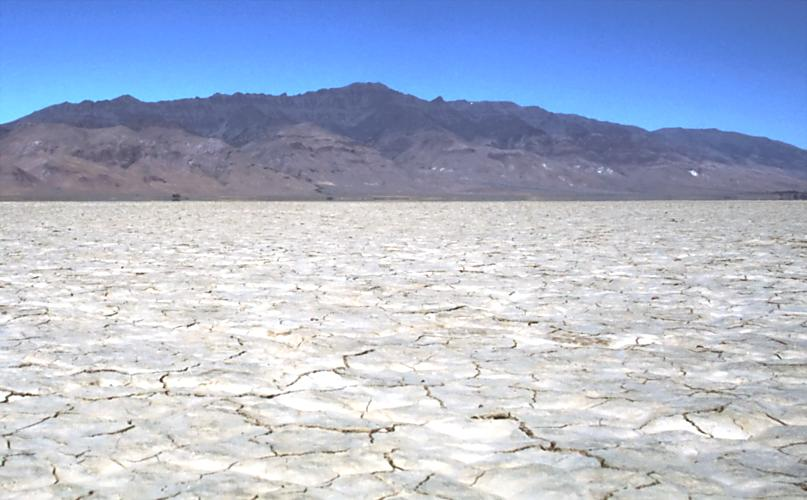
Steens Mountain to the northwest from the Alvord Desert

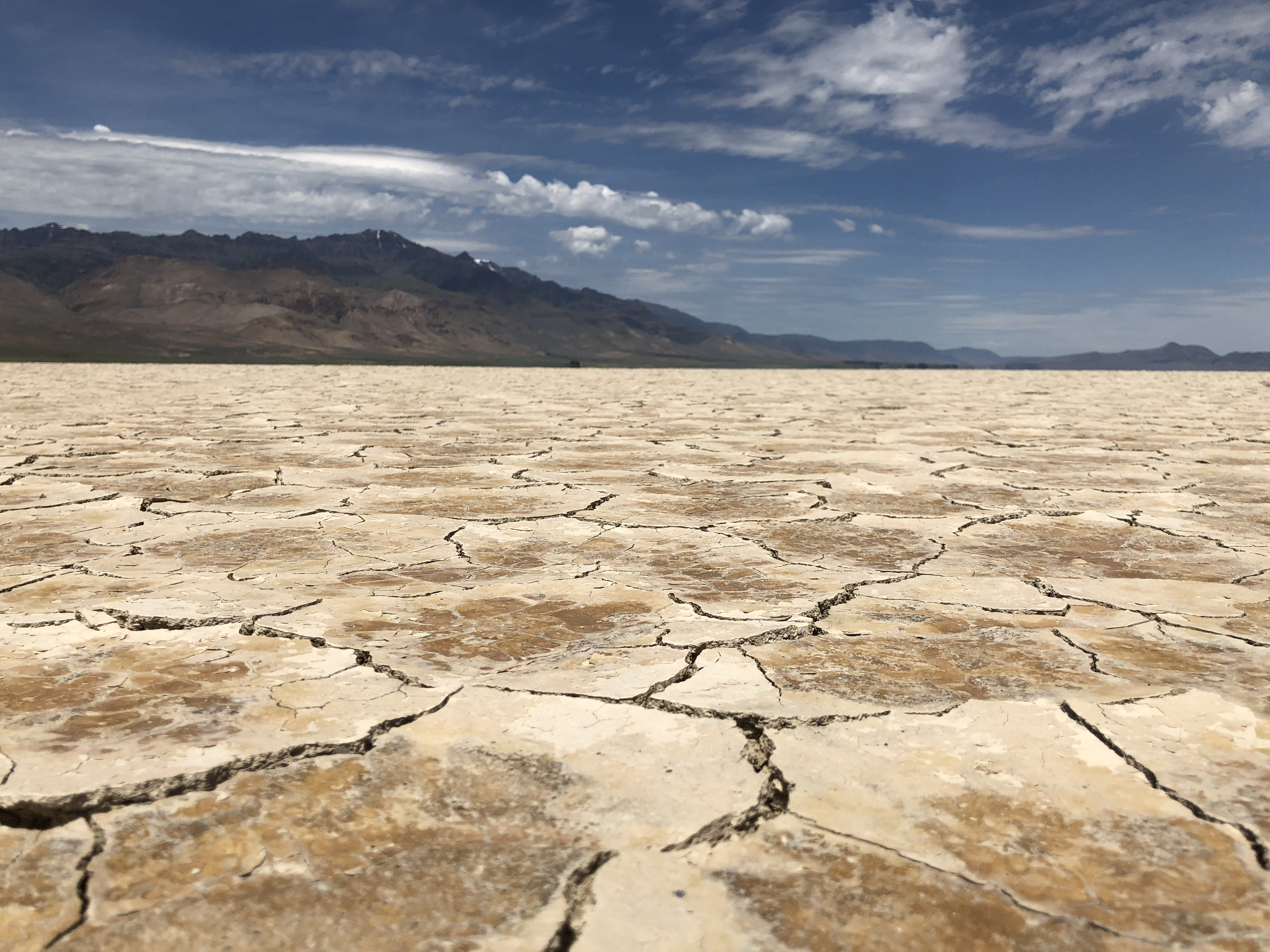
Close-up of the surface, June 2018
