= Outstanding Natural Area =

Protected area designation in the United States

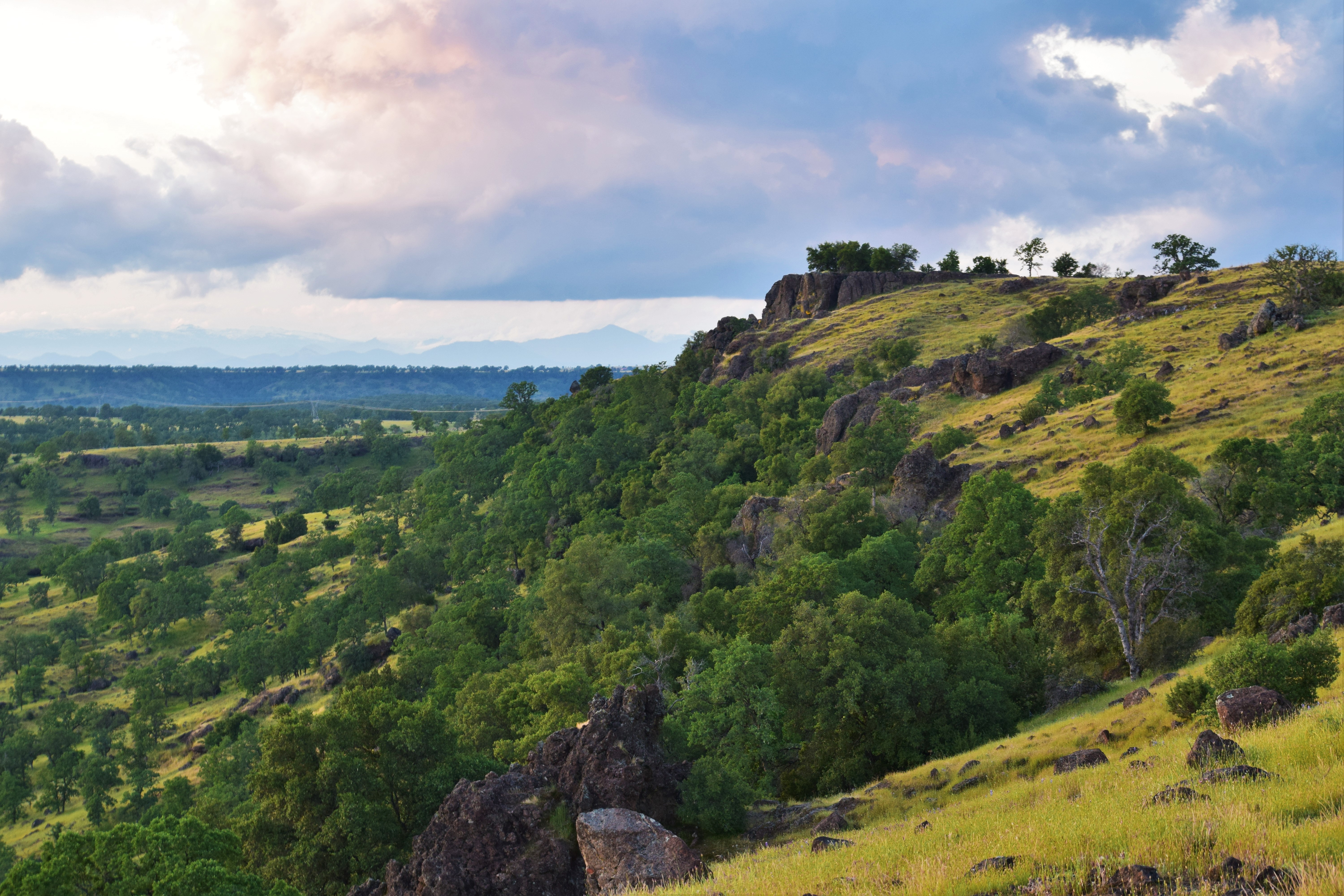
Sacramento River Bend Outstanding Natural Area, near Red Bluff, California

An Outstanding Natural Area is a protected area designation in the United States. The designations are managed by the Bureau of Land Management within the National Conservation Lands. Three ONAs have been designated by Congress, Jupiter Inlet Lighthouse, Piedras Blancas Historic Light Station, and Yaquina Head, all of which protect lighthouses and the adjacent land. The others were named by the BLM and have a variety of resources.

Name	Location	Notes
Devils Garden	Garfield County, Utah	Wilderness study area, part of the Grand Staircase–Escalante National Monument
Diamond Craters	Harney County, Oregon	
Ear Mountain	20 miles (32 km) west of Choteau, Montana	Four areas
Jacumba	near Jacumba Hot Springs, Imperial County, California	
Jupiter Inlet Lighthouse	Jupiter, Florida	The National Conservation Lands' only complete unit east of the Mississippi River
Piedras Blancas Historic Light Station	near San Simeon, California	Part of California Coastal National Monument
Rockwell	Juab County, Utah	Part of Little Sahara Recreation Area
Sacramento River Bend	near Red Bluff, California	
Valley of the Giants	Oregon Coast Range, Polk County, Oregon	
Yaquina Head	Newport, Oregon	
