= Sheepshead Mountains =

Mountain range in Oregon, United States

- Location within Oregon

Highest point
- Elevation: 1,704 m (5,591 ft)

Geography
- Country: United States
- State: Oregon
- County: Malheur
- Range coordinates: 42°53′36.574″N 118°8′41.637″W
- Topo map: USGS Ryegrass Butte

The Sheepshead Mountains are a mountain range in Malheur County, Oregon.
