= Edmund Creffield =

German-American cult leader

Franz Edmund Creffield in a prison photograph taken at the Oregon State Penitentiary, circa 1904.

Franz Edmund Creffield, commonly known as Edmund Creffield and by the pseudonym Joshua (c. 1870–1906), was a German-American religious leader who founded a movement in Corvallis, Oregon, that became known locally as the "Holy Rollers". The movement, mainly popular among women, was widely regarded as a cult. Creffield, who believed himself the second coming of Jesus, had a number of run-ins with the authorities and the local citizenry over the next several years, often stemming from his relations with his female followers and his increasingly erratic behavior.

In 1906 Creffield was murdered by George Mitchell, whose sister was one of Creffield's followers. After being acquitted of wrongdoing in the killing, Mitchell was himself murdered by his sister in revenge, with another follower's subsequent death by suicide. The story attracted national attention and was major news for a time in the Pacific Northwest.

== Life ==
Franz Edmund Creffield was originally from Germany; it is unclear how he came to Oregon or even what year he was born, with both 1867 and 1873 being mentioned in sources. There are some indications that Creffield and his family had emigrated to the United States sometime around 1884.

Contemporary sources speculated about Creffield being a deserter from the German army and places his arrival around 1900. Some contemporary sources stated that Creffield had been training to become a Catholic priest back in his native country, but there is no solid evidence for this claim.

What is known for certain is that Creffield first appeared in Seattle by 1899, and he quickly became involved in the Salvation Army. Contemporary sources state that he had been a "drunken tramp," who took a liking to the message of the street preachers. He soon joined their ranks as a cadet and began street preaching, himself. Before 1899 was over, Creffield was promoted to the rank of Lieutenant in Portland, OR.

In November 1899, Creffield was posted in Grant's Pass. He remained at that post until late May 1900, when he was transferred to Corvallis, OR. In August 1900 he was posted to The Dalles, OR. In November 1900 he was posted to Oregon City, OR. In February 1901 he was transferred to McMinnville, OR.

On February 14, 1901, Creffield was promoted to the rank of Captain. A few months later, on June 26, 1901, Creffield was posted to Heppner, OR. It was October 1901 when Creffield resigned from the Salvation Army stating that God had called him to preach His will, and he needed to find a more authentic way to follow God's word.

For the next year Creffield revisited the Oregon towns where he had been posted with the Salvation Army, sharing his new message and gathering converts. Most of 1902 was spent in The Dalles where he was part of the Peniel Mission alongside co-leaders Frank Cooper and James van Zandt. They found him to be too extreme and Creffield soon left. He spent some time in Salem, where he said he was deep in prayer when God told him he should create his own evangelical church.

It was late 1902 when Creffield returned to Corvallis, OR, where he formed his own group which he initially called the "Holiness Mission" or the "Army of Holiness." The members referred to themselves as "God's anointed," but the townspeople called them "Holy Rollers" because they rolled on the floor for hours during their services while praying. This form of fervent worship expressed physically can be seen to be an extreme form related to the Holiness movement concept of being slain in the spirit.

== Bride of Christ Church ==
Creffield did not say anything outrageous when he first came to Corvallis in late 1902, preaching mostly about "the beauty of the full Gospel." Soon his followers believed he was receiving messages directly from God. Creffield preached for hours on end and his followers loudly rolled on the floor pleading for God's forgiveness. When their cacophonous meetings began running into the early morning hours, Creffield was barred from holding services within city limits.

During the summer he and his followers camped out on John Smith Island, just south of Kiger Island in the Willamette River. When the fall rains started Sarah Hurt and her three children, Maud, Frank, and Mae, some of his most ardent followers, invited him and about twenty others to move into their house just outside Corvallis. In October the group burned most of the house's contents including furniture, utensils, heirlooms, a cat, and a dog. Members had discussed burning Sarah Hurt's adopted daughter, Martha Brown Hurt, who was a toddler at the time.

People soon began to ask if Creffield could really "live in the same locked house with a number of young girls, and do nothing in the world but be religious."

In January 1904, twenty vigilantes called the White Caps tarred and feathered Creffield and his three apostles, Charles Brooks, Sampson Levins, and Lee Campbell. The White Caps told them to leave town and never come back. That night they were back to receive help from Frank and Maud Hurt with the removal of the tar and feathers. The next day Creffield and Maud Hurt were married in a room where "the odor of [pine] tar was noticeable." The three apostles left the area together, and Creffield and Maud went north together to Hood River.

In February, a Mr. and Mrs. Worrell in Hood River came forward and said that they had joined Creffield's sect in Hood River but left when they realized he was having sexual relations with female members to purify their bodies. Donna Mitchell Starr was a member of the sect, and her husband, Burgess Ebeneazer Starr, pressed charges of adultery. Donna Starr was Sarah Hurt's sister-in-law, and the aunt of Maud Hurt.

Adultery was a criminal offense, so a warrant was put out for his arrest. A statewide manhunt went on for months. Meanwhile, many of his followers fasted and spent their days lying flat on the floor praying. Most were committed to either the Oregon State Insane Asylum or the Boys and Girls Aid Society in Portland.

In July, one month after Sarah Hurt was committed, Creffield was discovered nude and starving under her house. Creffield said he was innocent, but was found guilty and served fifteen months in the Oregon State Penitentiary. It was during this trial that Mrs. Worrell corrected the record and revealed that the sect's true name was the Church of the Bride of Christ. When released, Creffield claimed he was Jesus Christ risen from the dead, his resurrection being his emergence from prison.

Creffield said he was responsible for the 1906 San Francisco earthquake and his followers, all of whom had been released from the asylum, believed him. "Creffield is Jesus Christ," Cora Hartley said. "He condemned the city of San Francisco and brought the earthquake; he has condemned the city of Corvallis and an earthquake will destroy this place." She and the others obeyed his order to evacuate to the coast.

== Assassination ==
In April, Louis Hartley, a wealthy mine owner, followed his wife, Cora, and daughter, Sophie, when they went to Newport to meet up with Creffield and the others. As the group boarded a ferry, Hartley fired a revolver five times at Creffield. The gun snapped harmlessly because the centerfire cartridges were wrong for the rimfire gun.

Others were also gunning for Creffield, so he fled to Seattle with Maud. There, George Mitchell, the younger brother of Donna Mitchell Starr and the older brother of Esther Mitchell—also a devout member of the sect—found Creffield and shot him through the head on May 7, 1906.

Multnomah County’s district attorney, John Manning, sent King County’s prosecuting attorney, Kenneth Mackintosh, a letter saying, "I investigated many, many charges against him [Creffield] while he was on his Holy Rolling tour in Oregon, the character of which were perfectly awful, in so far as being low, degenerate and brutal, and if permitted, I would like an opportunity to testify before the grand jury, before Mitchell is indicted … I think the taking of the law in one’s own hands, under such circumstances, to mete out summary justice is almost excusable.". Mackintosh was appalled by Manning's suggestion.

O.V. Hurt, Creffield's father-in-law, hired one of the best law firms in Seattle to defend George. Numerous witnesses testified to telling George that "free love" took place in 1903. O.V. Hurt testified to the many things he had told George about the sect his sisters were a part of. O.V. told George what O.V.'s teenage daughter, Mae Hurt—also a former sect member—had disclosed to him; in order to be close to God, one had to have direct connection with him. According to Mae, this was to purify their bodies and had to be done through sexual relations with Edmund Creffield. According to Mae, this was a purification ritual that had to be performed in front of the entire sect. They said they told George that mothers were debauched in front of their daughters, including Sarah and her then sixteen-year-old daughter, Mae.

Many believe that much of the testimony was perjury, a tactic to avoid hearsay and put Creffield on trial. George was found not guilty by reason of insanity and released. Two days later, Esther shot and killed him using a gun Maud bought using their witness fees.

O.V. was devastated, but still loved his daughter so he hired the same lawyers who had defended George, to defend her. Before the case went to trial, Maud died by suicide. According to the chemist report, she had enough strychnine in her stomach to kill three people, though nobody aside from the coroner could accept that she'd actually committed suicide. Esther was found not guilty by reason of insanity and committed to Western State Hospital, an asylum in Steilacoom, Washington.

Esther was released from the asylum in 1909. She died by suicide in 1914.

== See also ==
- List of people who have claimed to be Jesus
- Messiah complex
