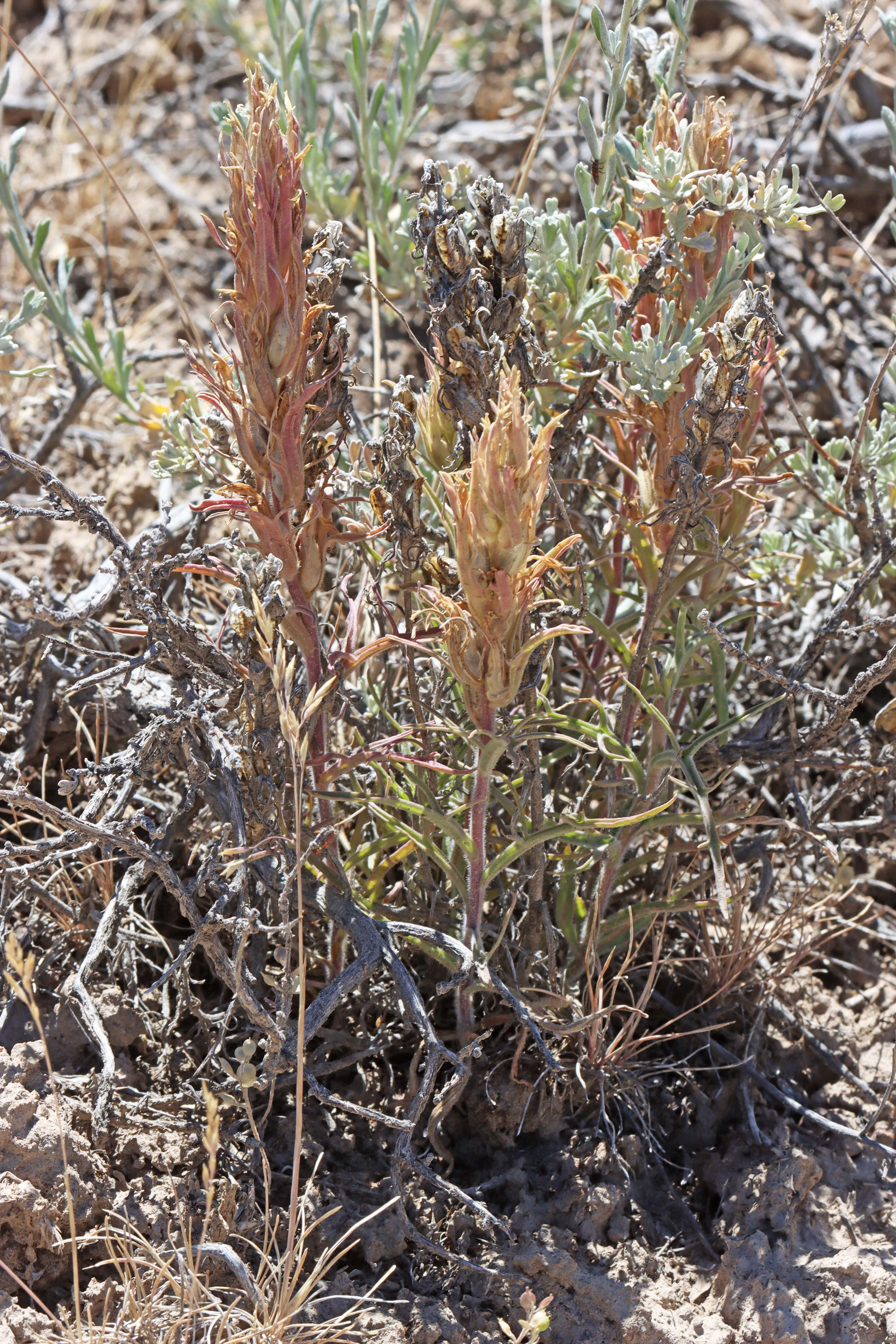

Scientific classification
- Kingdom: Plantae
- Clade: Tracheophytes
- Clade: Angiosperms
- Clade: Eudicots
- Clade: Asterids
- Order: Lamiales
- Family: Orobanchaceae
- Genus: Castilleja
- Species: C. pilosa

Binomial name
- Castilleja pilosa (S.Wats.) Rydb.

= Castilleja pilosa =

Species of flowering plant

Castilleja pilosa is a species of Indian paintbrush known by the common name parrothead Indian paintbrush. It is native to the western United States from California to Wyoming, where it grows in mountain and plateau habitat across the Great Basin and surrounding regions. It is known from sagebrush scrub to high mountains in alpine climates.

== Description ==
This wildflower is a perennial herb growing upright or along the ground with hairy stems up to about 35 centimeters long. It is quite variable in appearance. The inflorescence is made up of layers of greenish, purplish, or pink bracts sometimes edged in white. Between the bracts bloom the pouched yellow-green flowers with protruding stigmas.

=== Varieties ===
There are several varieties of this species:

- Castilleja pilosa var. longispica (longspike Indian paintbrush) – limited to Idaho, Montana, and Wyoming
- Castilleja pilosa var. pilosa – limited to California, Oregon, and Nevada
- Castilleja pilosa var. steenensis (Steens Indian paintbrush) – endemic to Oregon
