= Kiger Island =

Kiger Island is a 2,200-acre (8.9 km^{2}) island in Oregon formed by a fork between the Willamette River and the Booneville Channel. The island is located at 44°30′45″N 123°14′03″W. Kiger Island is south of Corvallis in southeastern Benton County, with the Linn County line following the contour of the eastern (river) side of the island. The only road to the island, SE Kiger Island Drive, is located off of Highway 99W (SW 3rd Street), just 2.5 miles south of downtown Corvallis.

== History ==
In pre-settlement times the island was a summertime home for the Chepenefra (Mary's River) Kalapuya. Indian artifacts and human remains have been discovered throughout the island.

In circa 1879 early Benton County pioneers Reuben Columbus Kiger, and his wife Minerva Jane (Dolly as her mother and stepfather affectionately called her), bought some land on a small island, which he and Minerva named "Kiger Island". In 1907 Reuben died from internal injuries following an accident removing a tree stump on the farm. The Kiger farm was then passed on to Minerva Kiger. Their two sons—John and Will Kiger— were not interested in being farmers, however they did live in the family owned farm house on Kiger Island.

In 1922 a woodcutter discovered a mastodon tusk while collecting firewood. "Elephant fossils are quite common in the vicinity of Kiger Island, said Dr. Horner, director of Oregon historical research in Oregon Agricultural college."

Until 1964, when it was finally dismantled to make way for a more modern construction, the Kiger Island covered bridge was - at 340 feet (100 m) - the longest covered span in Oregon. The bridge had been in use since at least 1914, and was updated in 1934 to State Highway Commission specifications, calling for the record setting length. However, the clearance did not even reach 16 feet (4.9 m), limiting the size of agricultural machinery and vehicles which could traverse it. In August 1963 the current bridge was built alongside the aging structure. In that same year the covering was removed from the old bridge, and in 1964 was dismantled entirely. The only evidence left of the historic span are small remnants of foundation pylons.

== Agriculture ==
Kiger island has long been used for raising cattle, however it has predominantly been used for agronomy purposes. In the first half of the 20th century, (James) Grant Elgin kept a large peach orchard on the island. Oregon's 14th Governor Oswald West (a state land agent at the time) owned the Island Home hopyard on the island from 1905 to 1909. A large variety of crops have subsequently been grown including apples, peaches, cherries, strawberries, blueberries, filberts, walnuts, wheat, corn, grass seed, clover, hops, tulip bulbs, and peppermint (first planted 1995-96).
