= Steens Mountain =

Mountain in Oregon, United States

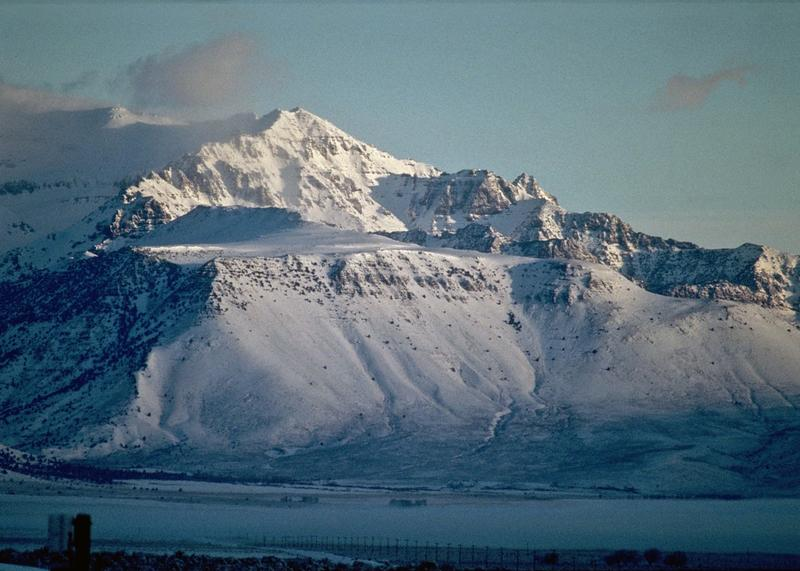
- Steens Mountain near Andrews, Oregon

Highest point
- Elevation: 9,738 ft (2,968 m) NAVD 88
- Prominence: 4,373 ft (1,333 m)
- Listing: Oregon county high points; North America isolated peaks 106th; U.S. most prominent peaks 178th
- Coordinates: 42°38′11″N 118°34′36″W

Naming
- Etymology: Enoch Steen

Geography
- Location within the United States Location within Oregon
- Location: Harney County, Oregon, U.S.
- Topo map: USGS Wildhorse Lake

Geology
- Mountain type(s): Fault-block mountain, volcanic mountain, shield volcano
- Volcanic field: Columbia River Basalt Group
- Last eruption: Before Pleistocene

Climbing
- Easiest route: Short hike from gravel road

Steens Mountain is a large fault-block mountain in the northwest United States, located in Harney County, Oregon. Stretching some fifty miles (80 km) north to south, on its east side it rises from the Alvord Desert at an elevation of about 4,200 feet (1,280 m) to 9,738 feet (2,968 m) at the summit. Steens Mountain is not part of a mountain range but is properly a single mountain, the largest of Oregon's fault-block mountains.

The Steens Mountain Wilderness encompasses 170,166 acres (265.9 sq mi; 688.6 km^{2}) of Steens Mountain. 98,859 acres (154.5 sq mi; 400.1 km^{2}) of the Wilderness are protected from grazing and free of cattle.

== Geology ==
Steens Mountain is a horst primarily composed of flood basalt deposits.

The east face of Steens Mountain is composed mainly of basalts stacked one upon another. Lava flows several hundreds of feet thick inundated the region between 17 and 14 million years ago. Chemical data from magma deposits from the area reveal three distinct stages of volcanism.

Layers of clay and volcanic dust show over forty lava flows on Steens Mountain. Most lava layers reach to 3,000 feet (910 m) thick or more in some areas. As the surface cracked, peaks and valleys were formed. Erosion and landfalls continue to modify the faces of the cliffs along the mountain. The sediment bedding is roughly horizontal, evidence to the absence of compressional forces. The white sediments consist primarily of stratified acidic tuffs. While rain hasn't been a main contributor to erosion, ice and snow melt are the main sources of erosion on Steens Mountain.

== Ecology ==
Vegetation in the Steens Mountain Wilderness varies greatly according to elevation. Common plants include sagebrush, juniper, various species of bunchgrass, mountain mahogany, aspen, mountain meadow knotweed, and false hellebore. Other vegetation endemic to Steens Mountain includes Steens paintbrush (Castilleja pilosa var. steenensis), moss gentian (Gentiana fremontii), Steens Mountain penstemon (Penstemon davidsonii var. praeteritus), Steens Mountain thistle (Cirsium peckii), a dwarf blue lupine, and Cusick's buckwheat (Eriogonum cusickii).

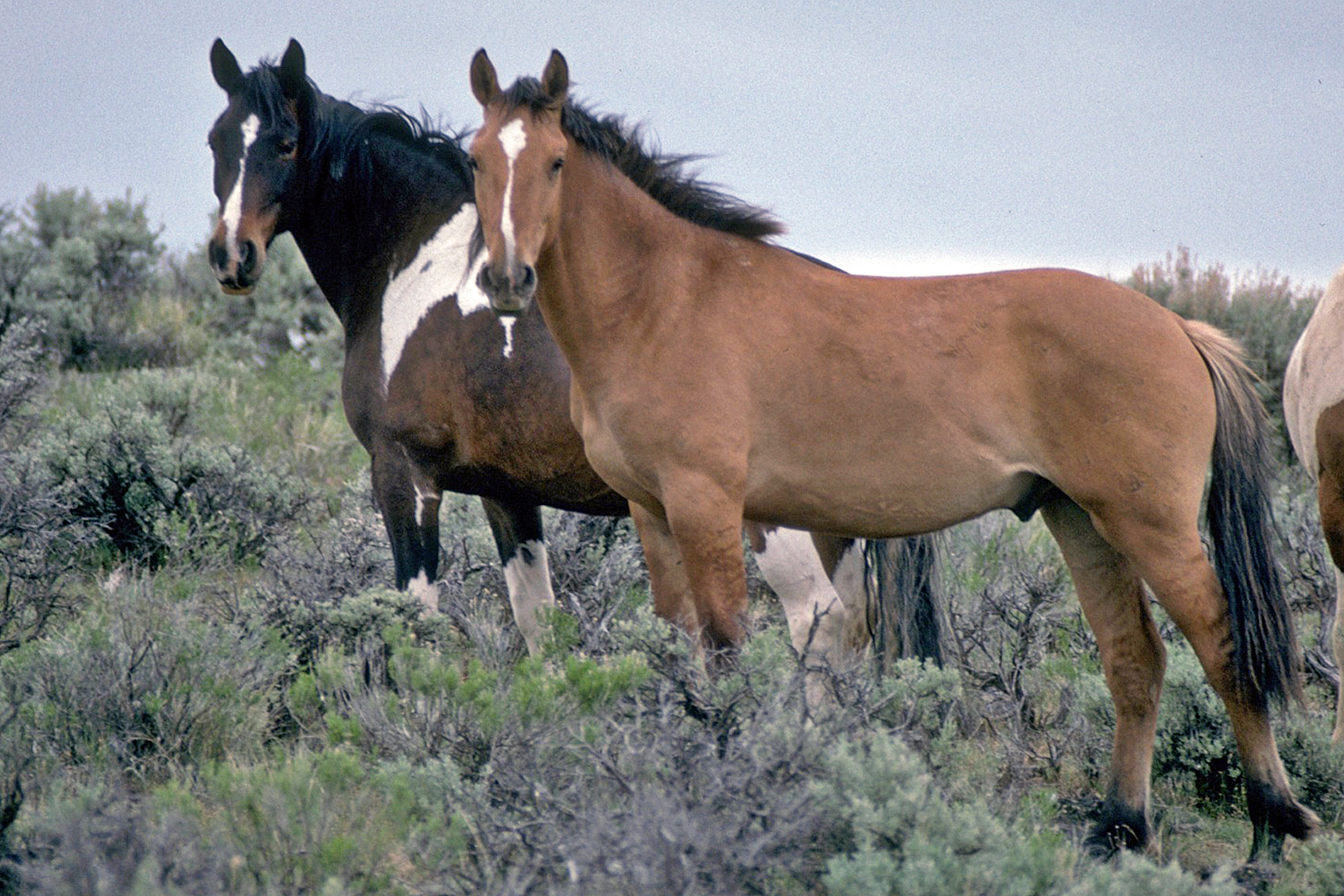
Wild horses and sagebrush on Steens Mountain

Steens Mountain is distinctive in its absence of trees of the pine family, Pinaceae, especially ponderosa pine and Douglas fir, at elevations in which they would normally be found – from 5,500–8,000 feet (1,700–2,400 meters) above sea level. Although other mountains of the Great Basin also lack these trees, Steens Mountain is the largest mountain area without them. One possible cause of the absence of these trees is the isolation of Steens Mountain, although lack of seed dispersal by bird species such as Clark's nutcracker may also be a factor. It is also possible that prehistoric fires, including fires used by Native Americans, eradicated the Pinaceae populations. Home to a wide variety of animals, the area is primarily known for birding, hunting, and fishing. Birds here include golden eagles, owls, and the protected sage grouse. Other animals found in the area include rattlesnakes, scorpions, elk, bighorn sheep, pronghorn antelope, and cougars. The area is home to feral horses. Drawing much controversy, the Bureau of Land Management engages in wild horse roundups every few years, employing helicopters to herd the horses. Historically, Steens Mountain Wilderness was once home to grizzly bears; a skull was unearthed in nearby Malheur Lake. In the 1970s, a wolverine was trapped and released on Steens Mountain.

== History ==
The mountain was called the "Snowy Mountains" by John Work, one of the fur traders who were the first Europeans in the area. It was renamed in 1860 for United States Army Major Enoch Steen, who fought and drove members of the Paiute tribe off the mountain. American Indians used the Steens Mountain, particularly Big Indian Gorge.

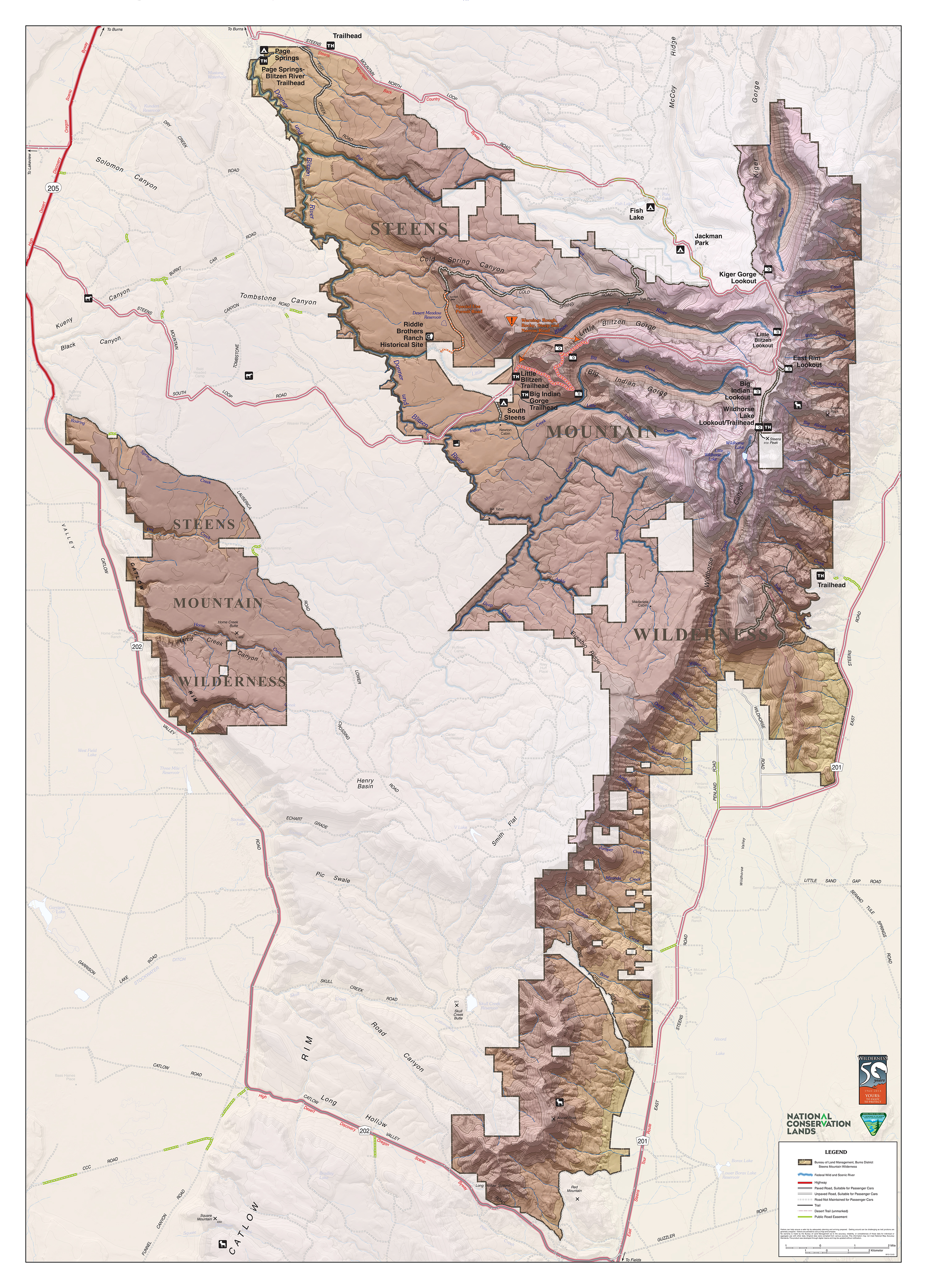
BLM Steens Mountain Wilderness Map

On October 24, 2000, President Bill Clinton approved the Steens Mountain Cooperative Management and Protective Act. The act was created by local landowners in cooperation with local and national government representatives in response to a proposed National Monument. This act created the Steens Mountain BLM Cooperative Management and Protection Area, a 425,000-acre (1,720 km^{2}) area. This law protects 1,200,000 acres (1,870 sq mi; 4,860 km^{2}) from mining, and 100,000 acres (156 sq mi; 405 km^{2}) from cattle grazing.

== Climate ==
Climate data for Steens Mountain 42.6400 N, 118.5808 W, Elevation: 9,318 ft (2,840 m) (1991–2020 normals)
Month	Jan	Feb	Mar	Apr	May	Jun	Jul	Aug	Sep	Oct	Nov	Dec	Year
Mean daily maximum °F (°C)	29.3 (−1.5)	28.7 (−1.8)	31.6 (−0.2)	36.2 (2.3)	45.4 (7.4)	55.0 (12.8)	67.3 (19.6)	67.0 (19.4)	59.1 (15.1)	46.7 (8.2)	34.0 (1.1)	28.4 (−2.0)	44.1 (6.7)
Daily mean °F (°C)	22.3 (−5.4)	20.5 (−6.4)	22.5 (−5.3)	25.9 (−3.4)	34.2 (1.2)	42.8 (6.0)	53.4 (11.9)	53.1 (11.7)	45.7 (7.6)	35.7 (2.1)	26.4 (−3.1)	21.5 (−5.8)	33.7 (0.9)
Mean daily minimum °F (°C)	15.3 (−9.3)	12.4 (−10.9)	13.5 (−10.3)	15.6 (−9.1)	23.0 (−5.0)	30.6 (−0.8)	39.6 (4.2)	39.1 (3.9)	32.3 (0.2)	24.6 (−4.1)	18.9 (−7.3)	14.5 (−9.7)	23.3 (−4.8)
Average precipitation inches (mm)	6.81 (173)	5.34 (136)	6.40 (163)	5.87 (149)	4.92 (125)	2.74 (70)	0.57 (14)	0.63 (16)	1.05 (27)	2.95 (75)	4.93 (125)	7.57 (192)	49.78 (1,265)
Source: PRISM Climate Group

== Recreation ==
The west slope of Steens Mountain is traversed by a 52-mile (84 km) loop road, which is suitable for passenger vehicles. The road reaches an elevation of 9,700 feet (2,960 m), making it the highest road in Oregon. It is possible to drive nearly to the summit of the mountain and to other viewpoints such as Kiger Gorge. Steens Mountain is also host to Steens Mountain High Altitude Running Camp.

Other recreational activities enjoyed on and around Steens Mountain are camping, picknicking, bicycling, hiking, hunting, sightseeing, soaring, and exploring. There are numerous hot springs along the base of Steens Mountain, including Alvord Hot Springs. Far from city lights, stargazing is also popular.

== See also ==
- Steens Mountain Wilderness
