= Mountain View Fire =

2020 wildfire in California and Nevada

- Part of the 2020 California wildfires and 2020 Nevada wildfires
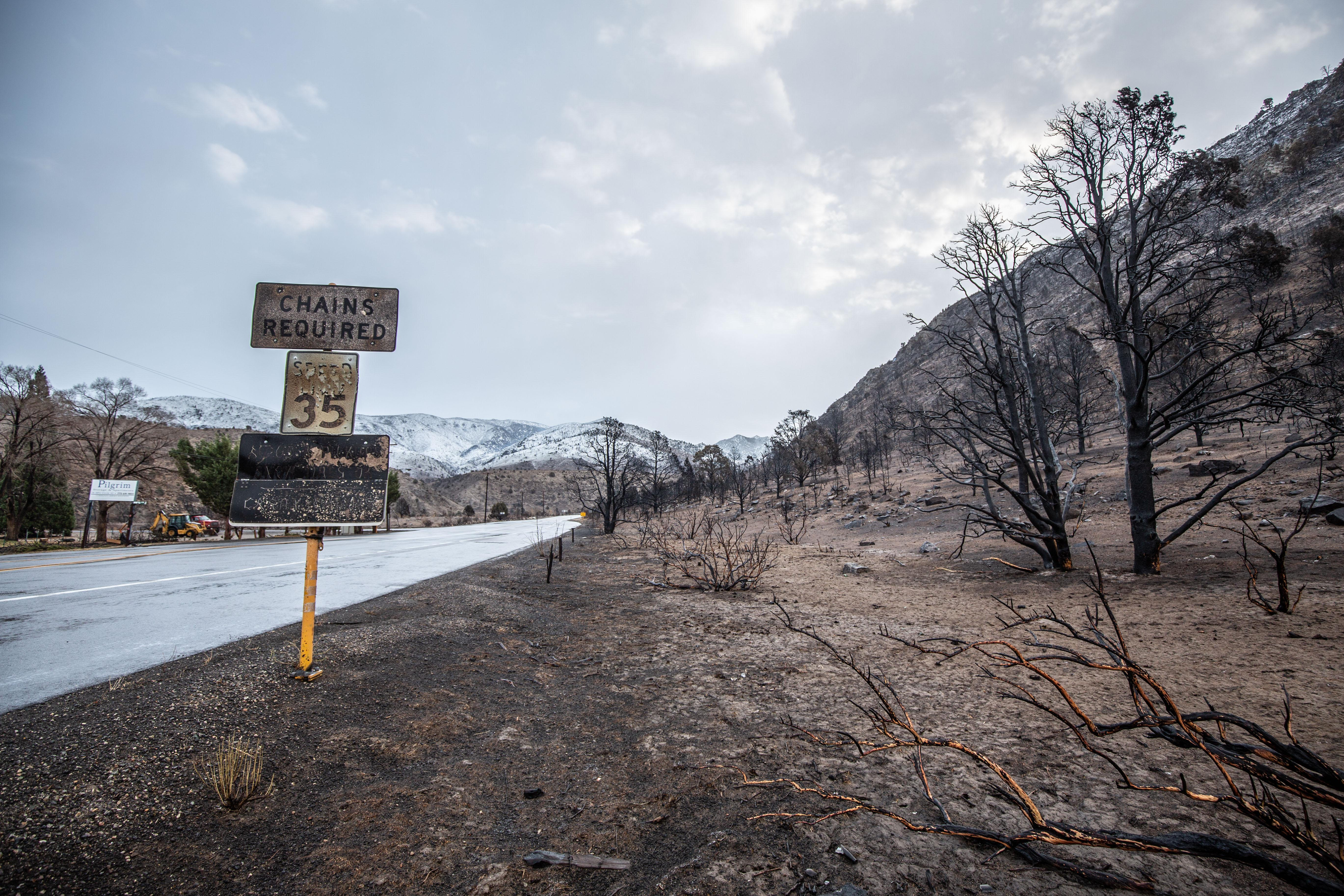
- The Mountain View Fire's burn scar on 11/18/2020
- Date: November 17, 2020 –; December 11, 2020
- Location: Walker in Mono County, California, Alpine County, California
- Coordinates: 38.515°N 119.465°W

Statistics
- Burned area: 20,879 acres (8,449 ha)

Impacts
- Deaths: 1
- Injuries: 1
- Evacuated: 1,200
- Structures lost: >80

Ignition
- Cause: Downed powerline

Map
- Location in California

The Mountain View Fire was a fire that erupted near Walker, California, on November 17, 2020 due to a downed powerline. As of December 11, 2020, the fire was fully contained, and claimed one life. The fire crossed the Nevada border into Douglas County. The fire was a ground fire and there was little activity due to snow. The fire destroyed over eighty homes.

== Cause ==
The fire started on November 17, 2020 near the Mountain View Barbecue (the namesake of the fire) when powerlines owned by Liberty Utilities blown down by strong winds. At 11:55 am, strong winds blew two powerlines into each other, with witnesses reporting sparks, and because the powerlines were set to standard operations, they re-energized several times while in the dry grass, igniting the Mountain View Fire.

== Progression ==
On November 17, evacuation orders were issued in and near Walker, California, Coleville, California, Topaz, California, and Topaz Lake, Nevada. An evacuation center was established at the Carson Valley Inn in Minden, Nevada. The fire spread to about 4,000 acres (1,600 ha) that evening. Later that night, U.S. 395 was closed between Bridgeport and the California–Nevada border. By the next day, the fire had grown to 20,000 acres (8,100 ha), but precipitation helped slow the fire's spread. Power was de-energized in Walker and Coleville up to the California-Nevada border. U.S. 395 reopened and evacuation west of the highway were lifted. One person was killed and eighty structures had been destroyed. A pyrocumulus cloud was observed. Containment had increased to 20% that evening.

One injury had been reported on November 19 and the Mountain View Fire was a size of 20,879 acres (8,449 ha). California governor Gavin Newsom declared an emergency proclamation for Mono County. Homes and outbuildings in Walker were considered to have been "reduced to charred rubble". Officials stated the fire was "the most destructive fire in the county in recent memory". On November 21, 178 evacuees were still displaced and officials confirmed repopulation could begin on November 22 and containment increased to 60%. Smoldering occurred in small areas within the perimeter, but the evacuation order was lifted on November 22. Containment increased to 65% and a local assistance center opened at Antelope Valley Community Center. On November 23, containment increased to 70% while the remaining part of the fire was covered in snow.

The fire reached 100% containment on December 11.

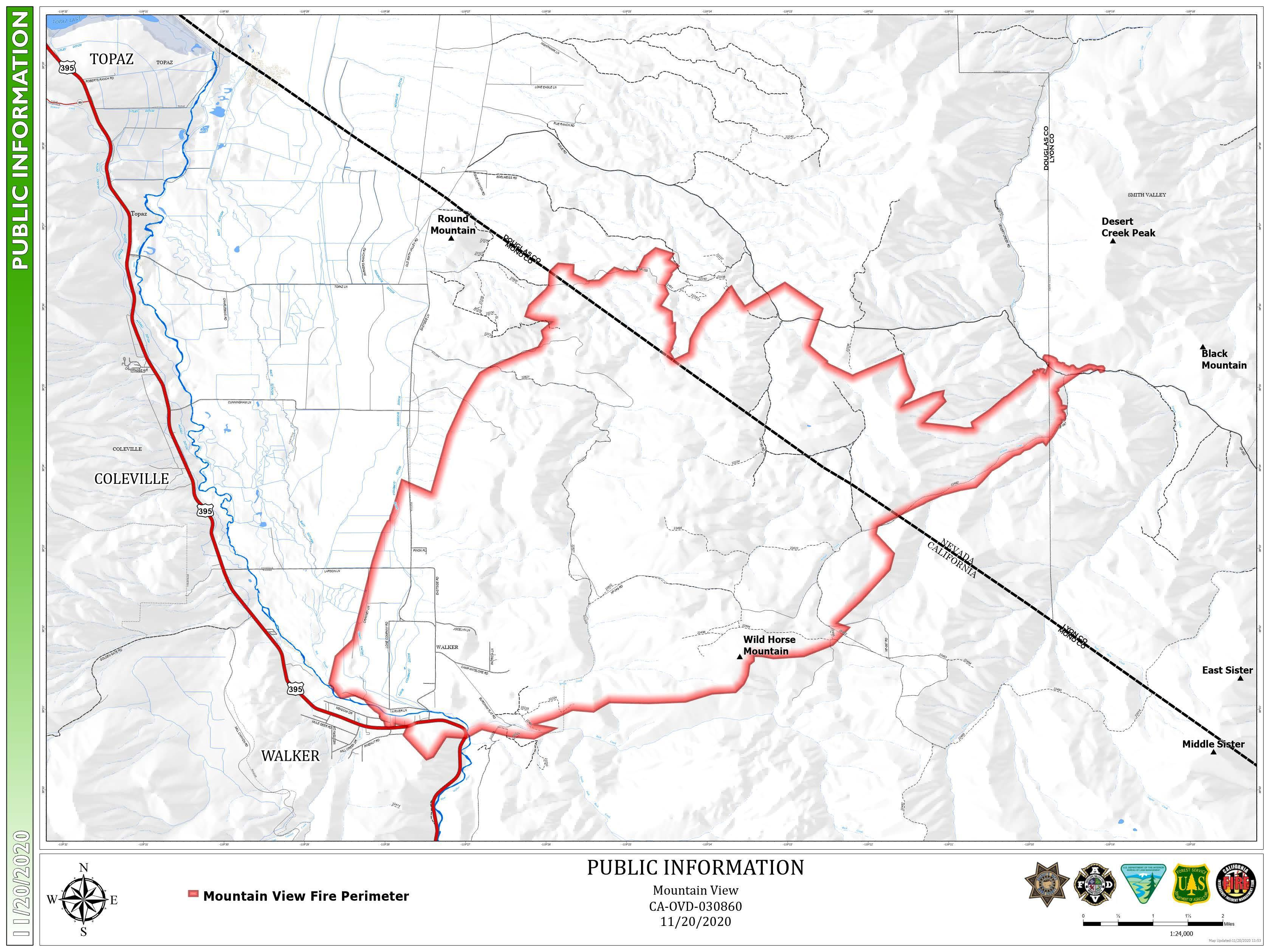
Map of the Mountain View Fire on November 17

== Effects ==
The fire caused evacuations for the towns of Walker, Topaz, and Coleville, and one person died from the fires, whose name was Sallie Joseph, aged 69. Governor Gavin Newsom issued a disaster declaration for both the Pinehaven and Mountain View fires. A total of eighty structures were destroyed. U.S. Route 395 was closed between Bridgeport and the California–Nevada border. Environmental hazards remained in Walker, including power loss and infiltrated water supply.

== See also ==
- Wildfires in 2020
- Pinehaven Fire, a small wildfire that burned in Reno, Nevada at the same time
