= Satview Broadband =

US telecommunications company

Satview Broadband Ltd.
- Type: Private
- Industry: Telecommunications
- Founded: August 2003 in Reno, Nevada, United States
- Headquarters: Reno, Nevada, United States
- Products: Cablecasting, Broadband Internet, Telephone
- Website: http://www.satview.net

Satview Broadband is a privately owned cable television Multiple System Operator in the United States, with franchise cable television systems in the State of Colorado and Nevada. Satview offers Video, High-Speed Internet and Telephone Service in Topaz Lake, Wells and Carlin, Nevada. Its systems in Battle Mountain and Elko were sold to Zito Media. Its systems in Utah were divested in 2010 and New Mexico were divested in 2015. The operator serves mainly rural towns and cities. It has cable franchises in Elko and Douglas, counties in Nevada, and has Cable systems in the State of Colorado.

Satview is headquartered in Reno, Nevada.

In Nevada the company operates in the cities of Elko, Carlin, Jackpot and Wells, Topaz Lake. In the state of Colorado Satview has a Cable system in Springfield

== Service areas ==
- Carlin
- Jackpot
- Wells
- Spring Creek,

== Services ==
- Cable Internet
- Cable television
- Dedicated Internet service
- Fiber optic cable facilities
- Telephone
- Digital cable
- Pay-per-view
- Data Transport
