= Antelope Valley (California-Nevada) =

Valley in California and Nevada, United States

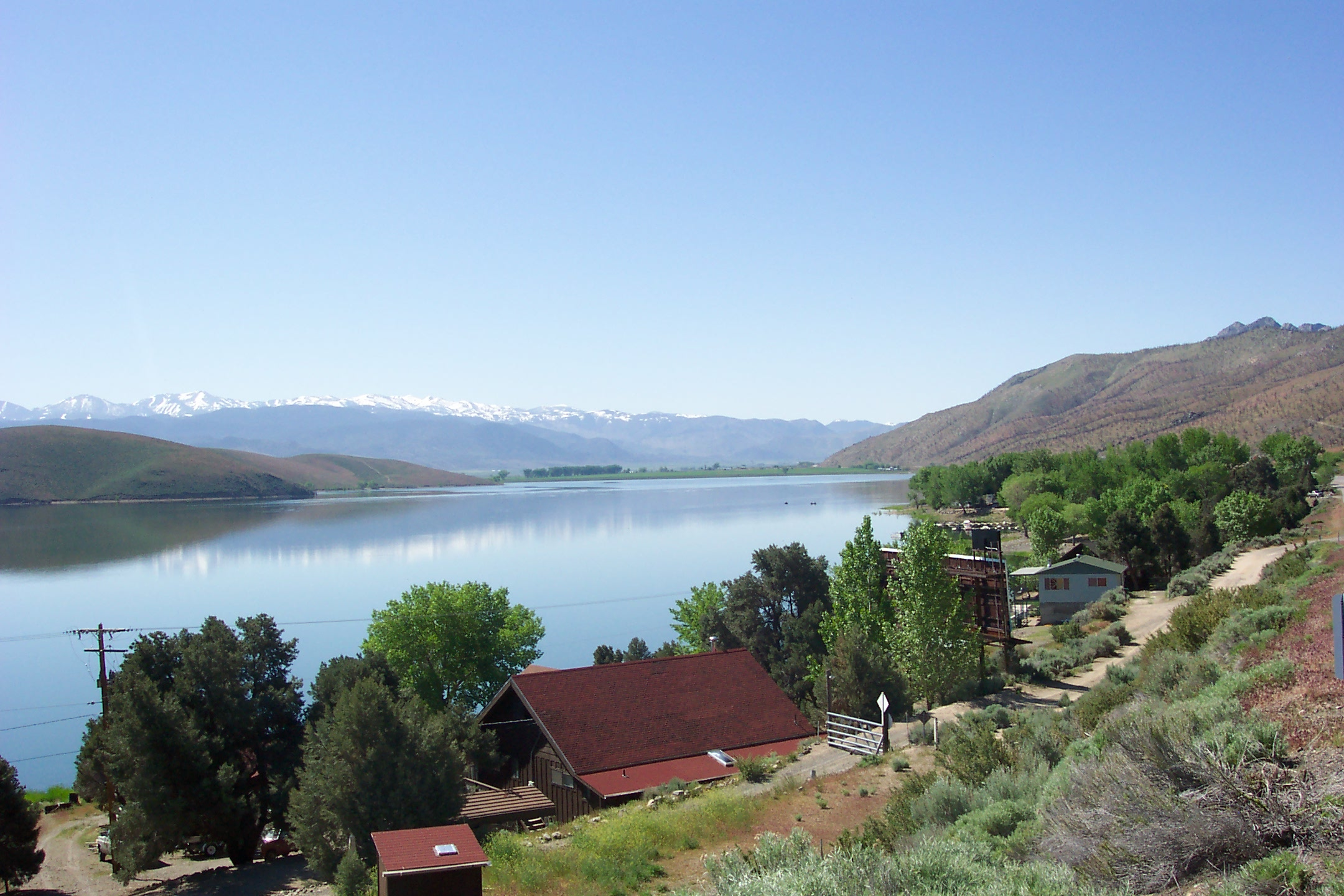
- Topaz Lake Reservoir valley center-west

- Location within the United States
- Length: 15 mi (24 km)
- Width: 8 mi (13 km)

Geography
- Country: United States
- States: Nevada; California
- Regions: Mojave Desert; Great Basin
- County: Douglas County, NV; Mono County, CA
- Population centers: Wellington, NV; Topaz, CA; Coleville, CA
- Borders on: Pine Grove Hills; Pine Nut Mountains; Sierra Nevada
- Coordinates: 38°44′12″N 119°24′35″W
- Rivers: West Walker River
- Interactive map of Antelope Valley

The Antelope Valley is a high valley in the eastern Sierra Nevada stretching from Mono County, California to Douglas County, Nevada.

== Geography ==
Antelope Valley is approximately 15 miles (24 km) long and 8 miles (13 km) wide. The USGS reports its elevation at 4,977 feet (1,517 m). It stretches from 38°44′12″N 119°24′35″W to 38°30′44″N 119°27′04″W. The mountains surrounding the valley floor rise to over 10,000 feet (3,000 m). The topography of the valley floor is gently rolling and conducive to the agricultural and pastoral uses to which it is put. The valley sides are made up of steep slopes. The primary land use is irrigation-based agriculture and grazing.

== Hydrography ==
Antelope Valley is watered by the West Walker River and Mill Creak, and contains Topaz Lake (a reservoir).

== Settlement ==
On the California side of the border, where the vast majority (33 square miles (85 km^{2})) of the valley lies, the Antelope Valley is served by the Antelope Valley Fire Protection District (formed 1947) and the Antelope Valley Water District (formed 1961), and includes the communities of Coleville, Topaz, and Walker.

The 2000 census reported that the population of the portion of Antelope Valley in California was 1,525. In 2003, the California Department of Finance estimated that the population was 1,557.

== Transportation ==
U.S. Route 395 traverses the valley and is its primary thoroughfare.

== See also ==
- Antelope Valley (Elko-White Pine Counties), Nevada
- Antelope Valley (Eureka County), Nevada
- Antelope Valley (Lander County), Nevada
