= Virginia Lakes, California =

Virginia Lakes
- Census-designated place
- Location within California Location within the United States
- Coordinates: 38°03′00″N 119°15′02″W
- Country: United States
- State: California
- County: Mono

Area
  - Total: 1.53 sq mi (3.96 km^{2})
  - Land: 1.44 sq mi (3.74 km^{2})
  - Water: 0.085 sq mi (0.22 km^{2})
- Elevation: 9,712 ft (2,960 m)

Population (2020)
  - Total: 7
  - Density: 4.9/sq mi (1.9/km^{2})
- Time zone: UTC-8 (Pacific (PST))
  - Summer (DST): UTC-7 (PDT)
- ZIP Code: 93541 (Lee Vining)
- Area codes: 442/760
- FIPS code: 06-82929
- GNIS feature ID: 2804106

Virginia Lakes is an unincorporated community and census-designated place (CDP) in Mono County, California, United States. It is located on the eastern side of the Sierra Nevada in the area of the Virginia Lakes basin, at the southwest end of Virginia Lakes Road, which leads northeast 6 miles (10 km) to U.S. Route 395 at Conway Summit. The community was first listed as a CDP for the 2020 census, when it had a population of 7.

== Demographics ==
Historical population
Census	Pop.	Note	%±
2020	7		—
U.S. Decennial Census; 1850–1870 1880-1890; 1900 1910 1920; 1930 1940 1950; 1960 1970 1980; 1990 2000 2010; 2020

Virginia Lakes first appeared as a census designated place in the 2020 U.S. census.

=== 2020 Census ===
Virginia Lakes CDP, California – Racial and ethnic composition Note: the US Census treats Hispanic/Latino as an ethnic category. This table excludes Latinos from the racial categories and assigns them to a separate category. Hispanics/Latinos may be of any race.
Race / Ethnicity (NH = Non-Hispanic)	Pop 2020	% 2020
White alone (NH)	2	28.57%
Black or African American alone (NH)	0	0.00%
Native American or Alaska Native alone (NH)	1	14.29%
Asian alone (NH)	0	0.00%
Pacific Islander alone (NH)	0	0.00%
Other race alone (NH)	0	0.00%
Mixed race or Multiracial (NH)	0	0.00%
Hispanic or Latino (any race)	4	57.14%
Total	7	100.00%

== Education ==
The CDP is served by the Eastern Sierra Unified School District for grades PK-12.
