= Husky Memorial =

Memorial for deceased motorcyclists

Coordinates: 35°12′57″N 117°19′3″W

Husky Memorial, also called Husky Monument, is a memorial for dead motorcyclists in California's Mojave Desert. It is on Bureau of Land Management (BLM) land, allowed by BLM but not officially sanctioned. It is a 21-mile ride from U.S. Route 395, the nearest paved road.
