= Slinkard =

Slinkard is a surname. Notable people with the surname include:

- Mary Lou Slinkard (born 1943), American politician
- Rex Slinkard (1887–1918), American modernist painter and teacher

== See also ==
- Slinkard Fire, a wildfire in Mono County in California
