= Little Walker River =

River in California, United States

Coordinates: 38°22′46″N 119°27′05″W

The Little Walker River is a tributary of the West Walker River, approximately 15 mi (24 km) long, in eastern California in the United States. It drains part of the Sierra Nevada mountains in the watershed of Walker Lake.

It rises from snowmelt in northwestern Mono County, north of Yosemite National Park in the Toiyabe National Forest. It flows north, joining the West Walker River from the south approximately 10 mi (16 km) south of Walker.

== See also ==
- List of rivers in the Great Basin
