= Topaz, California =

- Census-designated place
- Location in Mono County and the state of California

- Location within California Location within the United States
- Coordinates: 38°37′40″N 119°29′10″W
- Country: United States
- State: California
- County: Mono

Area
  - Total: 13.474 sq mi (34.90 km^{2})
  - Land: 12.177 sq mi (31.54 km^{2})
  - Water: 1.297 sq mi (3.36 km^{2}) 9.63%
- Elevation: 5,017 ft (1,529 m)

Population (2020)
  - Total: 150
- Time zone: UTC-8 (Pacific (PST))
  - Summer (DST): UTC-7 (PDT)
- ZIP Code: 96133
- Area code: 530
- GNIS feature ID: 2583165

Topaz (also Topaz Post Office) is an unincorporated community and census-designated place (CDP) in Mono County, California, United States. It is located 3 miles (5 km) north of Coleville. Topaz's ZIP Code is 96133. The population was 150 at the 2020 census.

== History ==
The Topaz post office opened in 1885, closed in 1922, and re-opened in 1926. The name was transferred from the original site of the village, which developed on the ranch of T.B. Rickey. Mrs. Rickey named it based on the color of the local quaking aspen trees. The post office is now located and has been operated by the Robert William Mckay Family Ranch since the 1920s.

== Geography ==
Topaz is the northernmost community in Mono County. It is bordered to the south by the community of Coleville and to the northeast by the Nevada state line. The community of Topaz Lake, Nevada, touches the northernmost part of the Topaz border. According to the Mono County government, Antelope Valley, including Topaz, is expected to see significant population growth.

U.S. Route 395 passes through Topaz, leading south 38 miles (61 km) to Bridgeport, the Mono county seat, and north 42 miles (68 km) to Carson City, Nevada. According to the United States Census Bureau, the Topaz CDP covers an area of 13.5 square miles (35 km^{2}), of which 12.2 square miles (32 km^{2}) are land and 1.3 square miles (3.4 km^{2}), or 9.63%, are water. Topaz is drained by the West Walker River, which flows north into Nevada. Topaz Lake occupies the northwest corner of the Topaz CDP and extends north into Nevada.

=== Climate ===
This region experiences warm (but not hot) and dry summers, with no average monthly temperatures above 71.6 °F (22.0 °C). According to the Köppen Climate Classification system, Topaz has a warm-summer Mediterranean climate, abbreviated "Csb" on climate maps.

== Demographics ==
Historical population
Census	Pop.	Note	%±
2010	50		—
2020	150		200.0%
U.S. Decennial Census; 2000 2010

Topaz first appeared as a census designated place in the 2010 U.S. census.

The 2020 United States census reported that Topaz had a population of 150. The population density was 12.3 inhabitants per square mile (4.7/km^{2}). The racial makeup of Topaz was 89 (59.3%) White, 1 (0.7%) African American, 5 (3.3%) Native American, 0 (0.0%) Asian, 0 (0.0%) Pacific Islander, 20 (13.3%) from other races, and 35 (23.3%) from two or more races. Hispanic or Latino of any race were 46 persons (30.7%).

The whole population lived in households. There were 73 households, out of which 18 (24.7%) had children under the age of 18 living in them, 30 (41.1%) were married-couple households, 3 (4.1%) were cohabiting couple households, 19 (26.0%) had a female householder with no partner present, and 21 (28.8%) had a male householder with no partner present. 26 households (35.6%) were one person, and 12 (16.4%) were one person aged 65 or older. The average household size was 2.05. There were 42 families (57.5% of all households).

The age distribution was 24 people (16.0%) under the age of 18, 7 people (4.7%) aged 18 to 24, 37 people (24.7%) aged 25 to 44, 39 people (26.0%) aged 45 to 64, and 43 people (28.7%) who were 65 years of age or older. The median age was 49.7 years. There were 89 males and 61 females.

There were 94 housing units at an average density of 7.7 units per square mile (3.0 units/km^{2}), of which 73 (77.7%) were occupied. Of these, 60 (82.2%) were owner-occupied, and 13 (17.8%) were occupied by renters.

== Fire protection district ==
Topaz is served by the Antelope Valley Fire Protection District, which was formed in 1947 and covers 33 square miles (85 km^{2}) of the Antelope Valley. The District maintains a fire station in Topaz.

== Water district ==
Topaz is served by the Antelope Valley Water District, which was formed in 1961.

== Education ==
Topaz is served by the Eastern Sierra Unified School District for grades PK-12.

== See also ==
- Slinkard Fire
- Walker
