= Lakeview–Burns Highway =

The Lakeview–Burns Highway refers to two named state highways in Oregon.

- Lakeview–Burns Highway No. 18 – planned in 1917, but never built
- Lakeview–Burns Highway No. 49 – opened in 1933, also known as U.S. Highway 395
