= List of rivers of the Great Basin =

Coordinates: 40°40′N 117°40′W

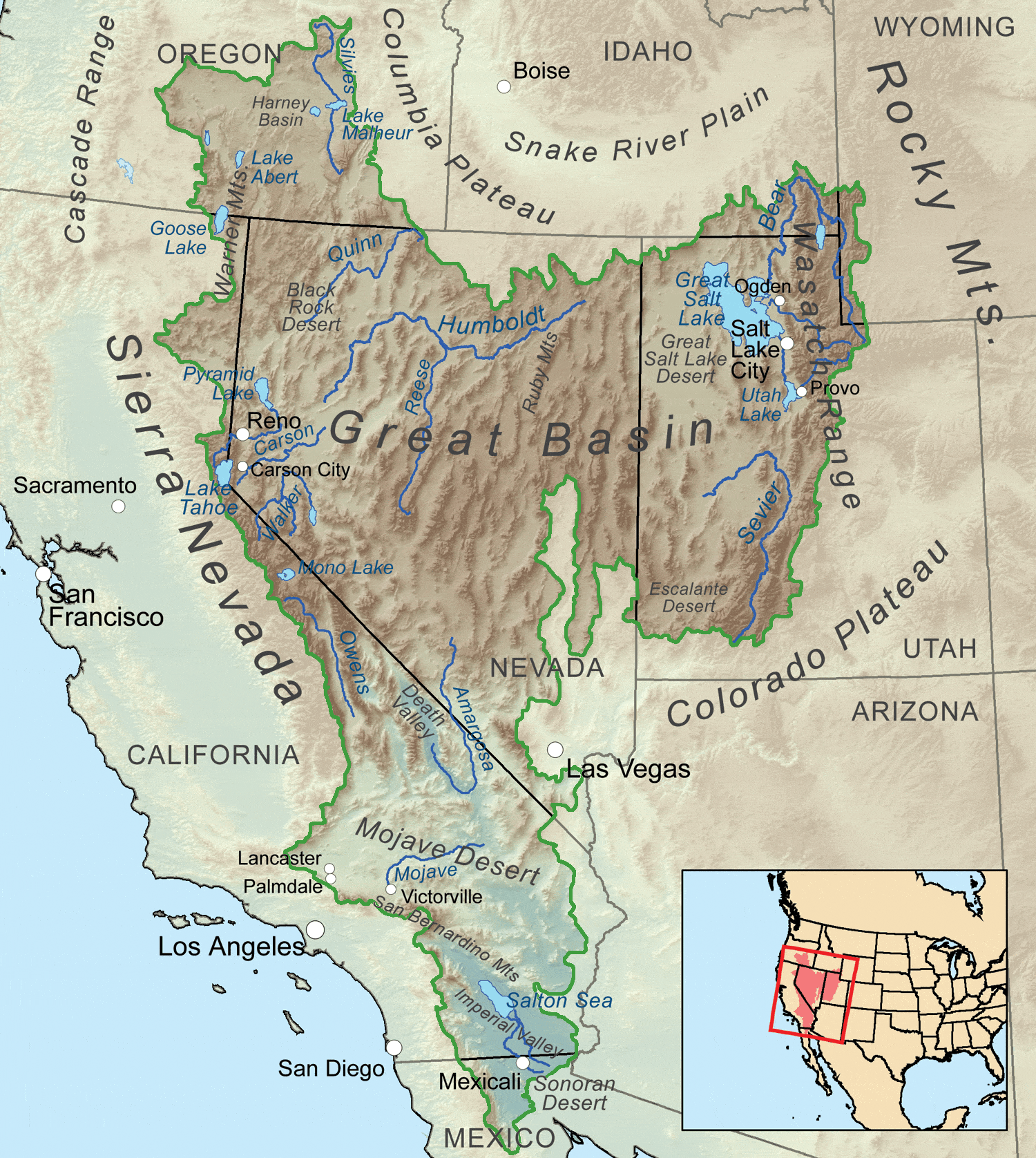
Map of the Great Basin

The list of rivers of the Great Basin identifies waterways named as rivers, regardless of the amount of their flow.

== Significant rivers ==
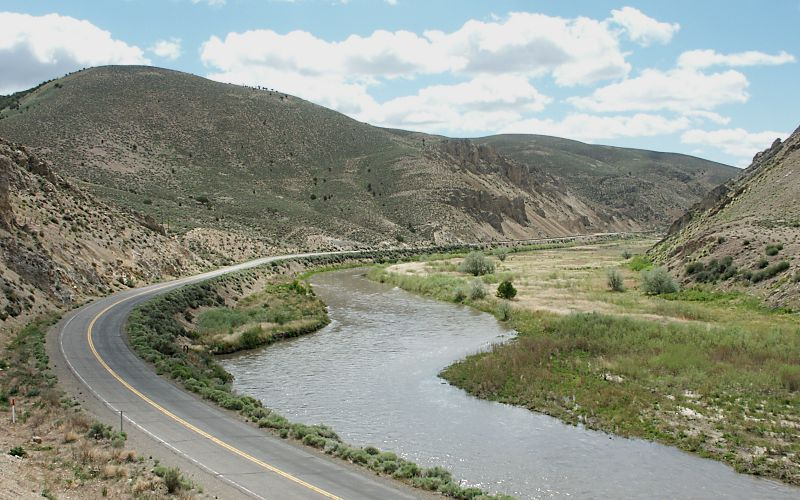
Humboldt River in Carlin Canyon, Nevada

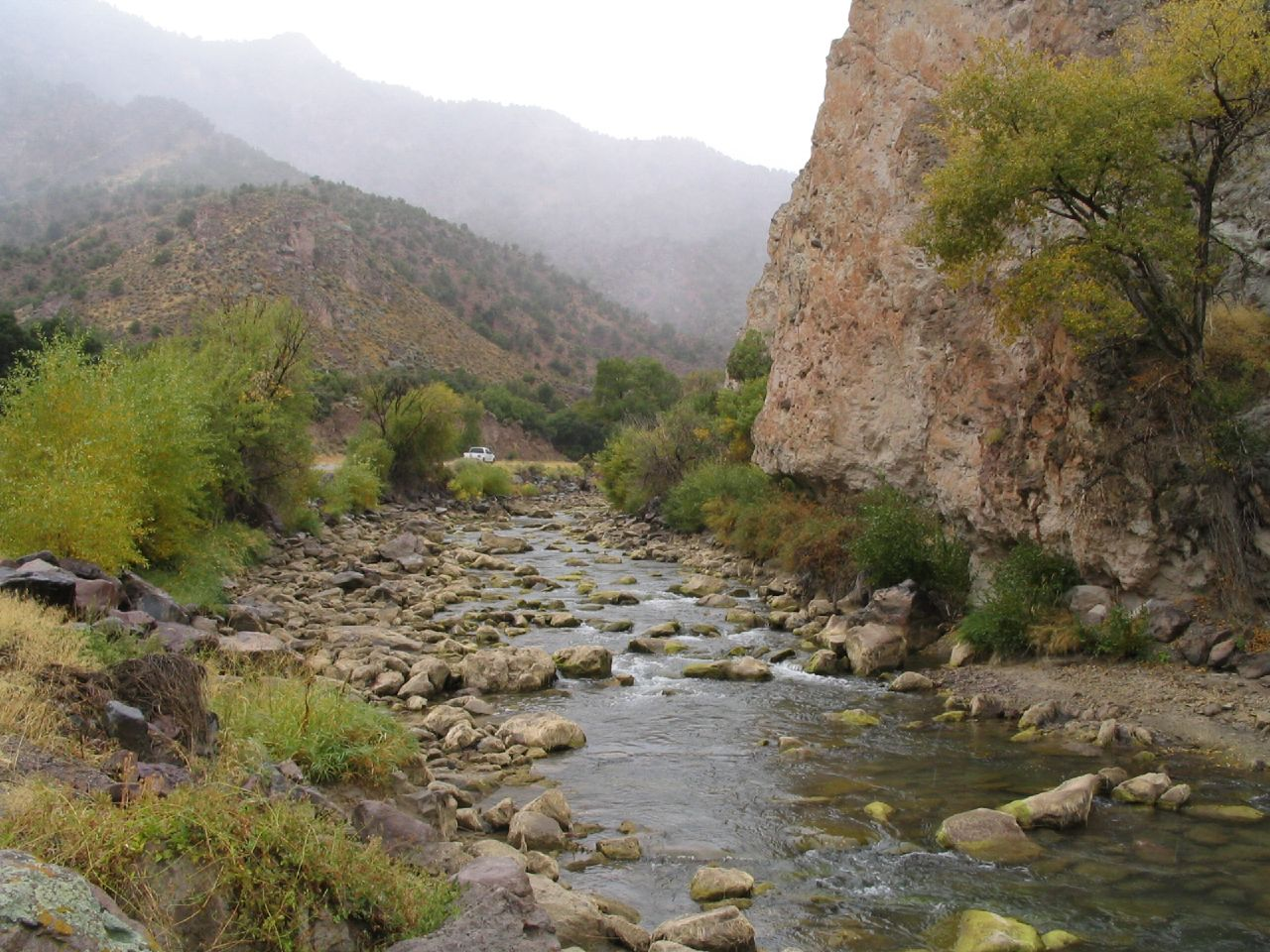
Sevier River

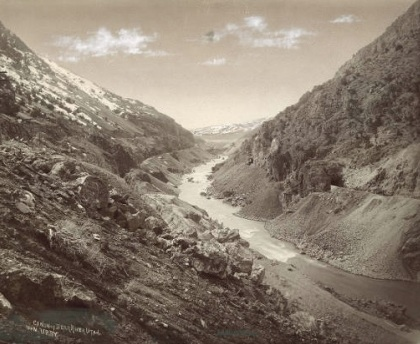
Bear River in Bear River Canyon

The Great Basin is a series of contiguous watersheds, bounded on the west by watersheds of the Sacramento-San Joaquin and Klamath rivers, on the north by the watershed of the Columbia-Snake, and on the south and east by the watershed of the Colorado-Green rivers. The following are some of the most significant rivers in the Great Basin, most of which are in the states of Utah and Nevada. While the longest rivers in the Great Basin are the Bear River (350 miles), Sevier River (385 miles), and Humboldt Rivers (290 miles). The meandering nature of the Humboldt River may make it as long as 390 miles.

- Amargosa River – Death Valley (Nevada, California), 185 mi (298 km)
- American Fork – Utah Lake (Utah)
- Bear River – Great Salt Lake (Utah, Wyoming, Idaho), 350 mi (560 km)
  - Malad River (Idaho, Utah)
  - Logan River (Utah)
  - Little Bear River (Utah)
  - Blacksmith Fork River (Utah)
- Chewaucan River – Lake Abert (Oregon), 53 mi (85 km)
  - Dairy Creek (Oregon)
  - Elder Creek (Oregon)
  - Bear Creek (Oregon)
- Carson River – Carson Sink (Nevada), 131 mi (211 km)
- Donner und Blitzen River – Harney Basin (Oregon), 61 mi (98 km)
  - Little Blitzen River
- Humboldt River – Humboldt Sink (Nevada), 151 mi (243 km)
  - Little Humboldt River
  - North Fork Humboldt River
  - South Fork Humboldt River
  - Reese River
- Jordan River – Great Salt Lake (Utah), 51.4 mi (82.7 km)
- Mojave River – Mojave Desert (California), 110 mi (180 km)
- Owens River – Owens Valley (California), 183 mi (295 km)
- Provo River – Utah Lake (Utah), 80 mi (130 km)
- Quinn River – Black Rock Desert (Nevada), 110 mi (180 km)
  - Kings River
- Salton Sea
  - New River
  - Whitewater River
  - Alamo River
  - San Felipe Creek
- Sevier River – Sevier Lake (Utah), 385 mi (620 km)
  - East Fork Sevier River
  - Beaver River
    - Cullen Creek
  - San Pitch River
- Silvies River – Harney Basin (Oregon), 119 mi (192 km)
- Susan River – Honey Lake (California), 20 mi (32 km)
- Spanish Fork – Utah Lake (Utah), 20 mi (32 km)
  - Soldier Creek
  - Thistle Creek
- Truckee River – Pyramid Lake (California, Nevada), 121 mi (195 km)
- Walker River – Walker Lake (Nevada), 62 mi (100 km)
  - East Walker River
  - West Walker River
    - Little Walker River
- Weber River – Great Salt Lake (Utah), 125 mi (201 km)
  - Ogden River

== See also ==
- Landforms of the Great Basin
- List of Great Basin watersheds
- List of rivers of the Americas
- List of rivers of California
- List of rivers of Colorado
- List of rivers of Nevada
- List of rivers of Oregon
- List of rivers of Utah
- List of rivers of Wyoming
