= Walker, Mono County, California =

Walker
- Census-designated place
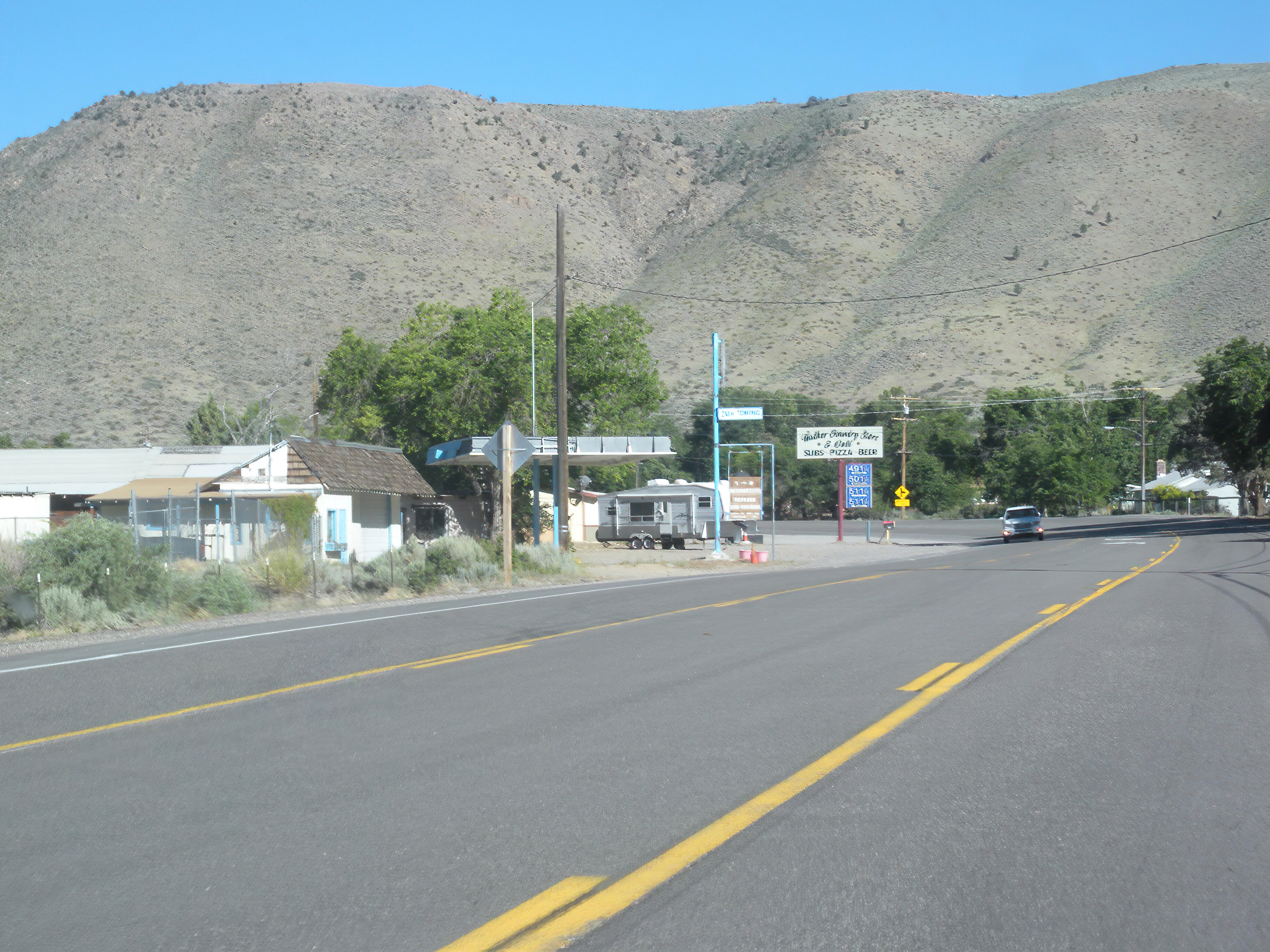
- U.S. 395 passing through Walker

- Location in Mono County and the state of California

- Location within California Location within the United States
- Coordinates: 38°30′54″N 119°28′37″W
- Country: United States
- State: California
- County: Mono

Area
  - Total: 12.15 sq mi (31.47 km^{2})
  - Land: 12.15 sq mi (31.47 km^{2})
  - Water: 0 sq mi (0 km^{2})
- Elevation: 5,387 ft (1,642 m)

Population (2020)
  - Total: 704
  - Density: 57.9/sq mi (22.4/km^{2})
- Time zone: UTC-8 (Pacific (PST))
  - Summer (DST): UTC-7 (PDT)
- ZIP Code: 96107 (Coleville)
- Area code: 530
- GNIS feature IDs: 2583180

Walker is an unincorporated community and census-designated place (CDP) in Mono County, California, United States. It is located 3 miles (5 km) south of Coleville. The ZIP Code is 96107, and mail to Walker should be addressed Coleville.

The town was likely named for pioneer Joseph R. Walker, who started his ascent of the Sierra Nevada range (as part of a longer expedition which ended in Monterey) in nearby Bridgeport. The Walker area was devastated by the 2020 Mountain View Fire, which resulted in evacuations. The population was 704 at the 2020 census.

== Geography ==
Walker is one of the three northernmost communities in Mono County. It is bordered to the north by Coleville, which in turn is bordered to the north by Topaz. According to the Mono County government, Antelope Valley, including Walker, is expected to see significant population growth.

U.S. Route 395 passes through Walker, leading north 50 miles (80 km) to Carson City, Nevada, and southeast 30 miles (48 km) to Bridgeport, the Mono county seat.

According to the United States Census Bureau, the CDP covers an area of 12.2 square miles (32 km^{2}), all land. Walker is situated at the southern end of the Antelope Valley, drained to the north by the West Walker River.

== Climate ==
Climate data for Walker, California, 2006–2020 normals, extremes 2001–present
Month	Jan	Feb	Mar	Apr	May	Jun	Jul	Aug	Sep	Oct	Nov	Dec	Year
Record high °F (°C)	73 (23)	75 (24)	80 (27)	85 (29)	94 (34)	98 (37)	102 (39)	100 (38)	101 (38)	88 (31)	77 (25)	72 (22)	102 (39)
Mean maximum °F (°C)	62.0 (16.7)	66.6 (19.2)	72.4 (22.4)	79.2 (26.2)	85.5 (29.7)	94.7 (34.8)	97.9 (36.6)	96.1 (35.6)	92.0 (33.3)	82.3 (27.9)	73.5 (23.1)	65.7 (18.7)	98.4 (36.9)
Mean daily maximum °F (°C)	47.8 (8.8)	50.7 (10.4)	56.7 (13.7)	62.6 (17.0)	70.2 (21.2)	82.2 (27.9)	90.7 (32.6)	88.7 (31.5)	81.0 (27.2)	67.9 (19.9)	56.6 (13.7)	46.5 (8.1)	66.9 (19.4)
Daily mean °F (°C)	38.0 (3.3)	40.1 (4.5)	45.1 (7.3)	50.4 (10.2)	57.9 (14.4)	68.6 (20.3)	76.9 (24.9)	74.8 (23.8)	67.3 (19.6)	55.2 (12.9)	45.3 (7.4)	36.9 (2.7)	54.7 (12.6)
Mean daily minimum °F (°C)	28.1 (−2.2)	29.5 (−1.4)	33.4 (0.8)	38.1 (3.4)	45.6 (7.6)	54.9 (12.7)	63.1 (17.3)	60.9 (16.1)	53.6 (12.0)	42.5 (5.8)	34.0 (1.1)	27.2 (−2.7)	42.6 (5.9)
Mean minimum °F (°C)	13.4 (−10.3)	15.5 (−9.2)	21.1 (−6.1)	25.7 (−3.5)	33.1 (0.6)	39.6 (4.2)	53.9 (12.2)	51.6 (10.9)	39.7 (4.3)	27.7 (−2.4)	19.8 (−6.8)	12.4 (−10.9)	8.9 (−12.8)
Record low °F (°C)	0 (−18)	10 (−12)	12 (−11)	19 (−7)	26 (−3)	32 (0)	49 (9)	43 (6)	30 (−1)	15 (−9)	6 (−14)	3 (−16)	0 (−18)
Source: National Weather Service

== Fire protection district ==
Walker is served by the Antelope Valley Fire Protection District, founded in 1947 and covering 33 square miles (85 km^{2}) of the Antelope Valley. The District's main fire station is located in Walker.

== Water district ==
Portions of Walker are served by the Antelope Valley Water District, which was formed in 1961.

== Demographics ==
Historical population
Census	Pop.	Note	%±
2010	721		—
2020	704		−2.4%
U.S. Decennial Census; 2010

Walker first appeared as a census designated place in the 2010 U.S. census.

The 2020 United States census reported that Walker had a population of 704. The population density was 57.9 inhabitants per square mile (22.4/km^{2}). The racial makeup was 558 (79.3%) White, 1 (0.1%) African American, 51 (7.2%) Native American, 3 (0.4%) Asian, 0 (0.0%) Pacific Islander, 20 (2.8%) from other races, and 71 (10.1%) from two or more races. Hispanic or Latino of any race were 97 persons (13.8%).

The census reported that 696 people (98.9% of the population) lived in households, 8 (1.1%) lived in non-institutionalized group quarters, and no one was institutionalized.

There were 326 households, out of which 61 (18.7%) had children under the age of 18 living in them, 151 (46.3%) were married-couple households, 18 (5.5%) were cohabiting couple households, 85 (26.1%) had a female householder with no partner present, and 72 (22.1%) had a male householder with no partner present. 127 households (39.0%) were one person, and 76 (23.3%) were one person aged 65 or older. The average household size was 2.13. There were 177 families (54.3% of all households).

The age distribution was 99 people (14.1%) under the age of 18, 43 people (6.1%) aged 18 to 24, 126 people (17.9%) aged 25 to 44, 206 people (29.3%) aged 45 to 64, and 230 people (32.7%) who were 65 years of age or older. The median age was 56.6 years. For every 100 females, there were 110.1 males.

There were 426 housing units at an average density of 35.1 units per square mile (13.6 units/km^{2}), of which 326 (76.5%) were occupied. Of these, 238 (73.0%) were owner-occupied, and 88 (27.0%) were occupied by renters.

== Education ==
Walker is served by the Eastern Sierra Unified School District for grades PK-12.

== See also ==
- Topaz Lake
