= Slinkard Fire =

2017 wildfire in California, U.S.

- Part of the 2017 California wildfires
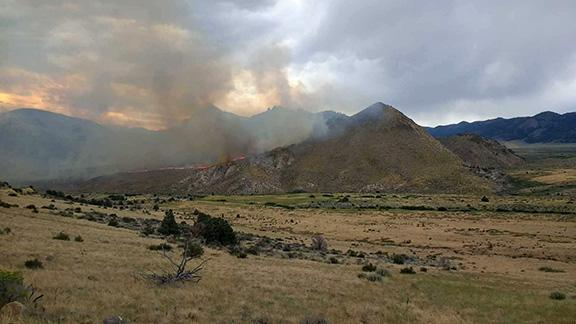
- Slinkard Fire on August 30, 2017
- Date: August 29, 2017 –; September 12, 2017
- Location: Walker, Mono County, California, United States; Alpine County, California, United States; Douglas County, Nevada, United States
- Coordinates: 38.619°N 119.557°W

Statistics
- Burned area: 8,925 acres (36 km^{2})

Impacts
- Cost: $1.9 million (2017 USD)

Ignition
- Cause: Lightning

Map
- Location of fire in California.

The Slinkard Fire was a wildfire in Mono County in California in the United States. The fire was reported on August 29, 2017. It was caused by a lightning strike. The fire was fully contained on September 12, after it had burned 8,925 acres (36 km^{2}).

== Progression ==
The Slinkard Fire was first reported on August 29, 2017, at 6:00 PM PDT. The fire was sighted west of Topaz, California. It was started in Slinkard Valley by a lightning strike.

By August 30, the fire had spread due to wind. It crossed California State Route 89 and started to move closer to Topaz. As of that day, Highway 395 was closed in the area and Topaz was evacuated north of State Route 89 and to the state line. Additionally, State Route 89 was closed between Highway 395 and California State Route 4. The fire had burned 1,500 acres (6 km^{2}). It was fueled by cheat grass, sagebrush and juniper. That evening the fire grew to 3,000 acres (12 km^{2}) and remained 0% contained. Highway 395 was also closed at the junction of California State Route 182 in Bridgeport to the Nevada state line. The fire expanded into Alpine County, California and Douglas County, Nevada.

The fire had grown to 5,000 acres (20 km^{2}) by the morning of August 31, burning to Highway 395 and crossing State Route 89. It remained in Slinkard Valley and had expanded to Antelope Valley. Power went out in the surrounding area. Closures and evacuation orders remained, with Highway 395 at Interstate 4 being closed. During the day and early evening, the fire traveled uphill and towards Alpine County.

Overnight, the fire was described as "active and erratic." The fire had moved north and west, along slopes towards Highway 395. The California Inspection Station was threatened and saved by fire crews. Crews prioritized the protection of Holbrook Junction and the Leviathan Lookout. Topaz evacuations and all road closures remained in place.

The fire moved very little on September 2 due to calm winds, with fire crews concerned about increasing temperatures, light wind and low humidity, all which could grow the fire. Highway 395 was opened throughout the area.

As of September 3, the fire had burned 9,051 acres (37 km^{2}) and was at 35% containment. A small spot fire occurred on Highway 395, but was extinguished quickly. The next day, only Highway 89 over Monitor Pass remained closed.

As of the morning of September 5, the fire had been 74% contained. The fire remained on the west slope of Antelope Valley, west of Topaz Lake, and eight miles north of Walker. The fire remained in Mono County only, no longer burning in Alpine County, California and Douglas County, Nevada. In total, 322 fire personnel, four helicopters, 24 fire engines, two dozers, and seven water tenders fought the Slinkard Fire. On September 12, the fire was 100% contained.
