= Coleville, California =

- Census-designated place
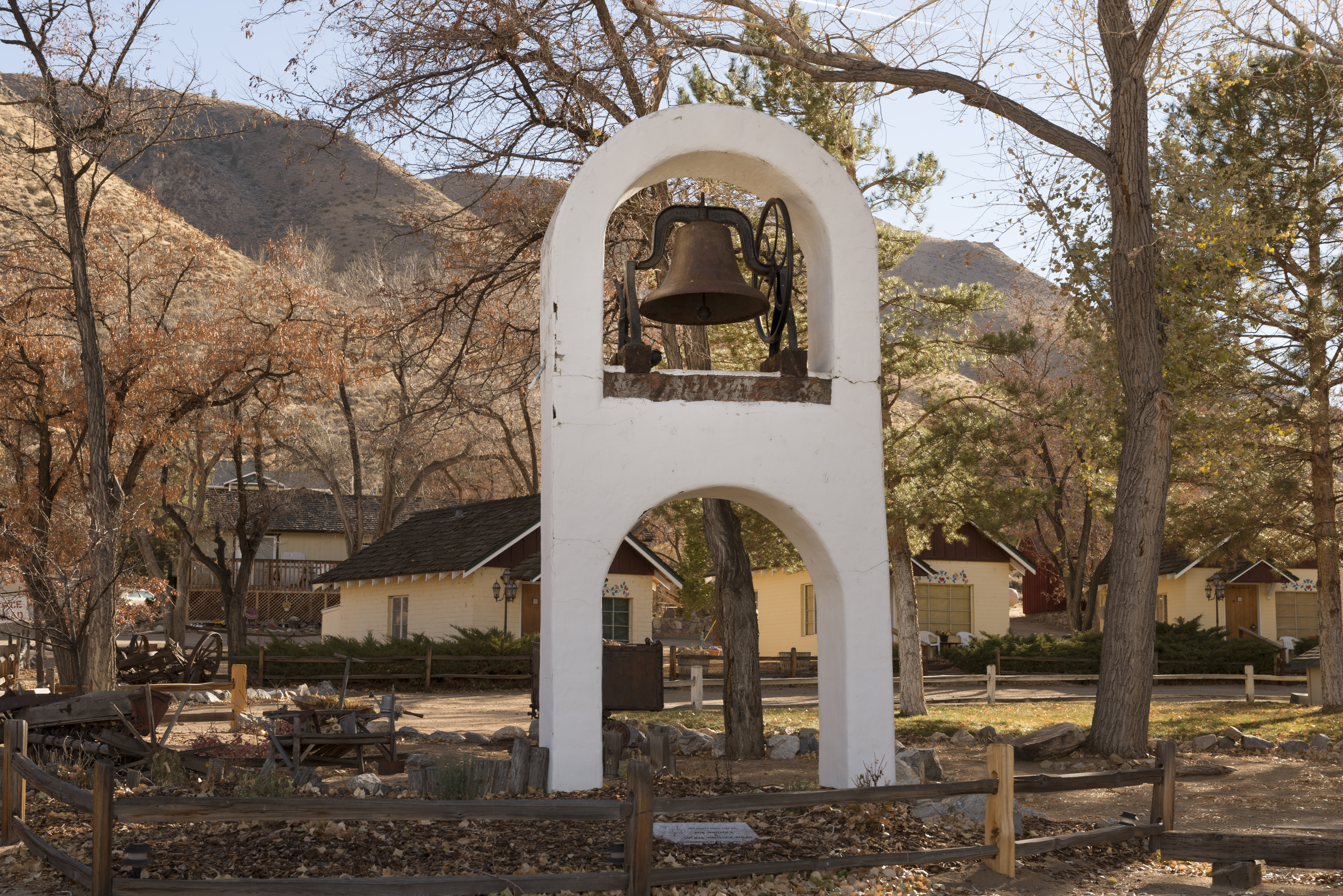
- Coleville

- Location in Mono County and the state of California

- Location within California Location within the United States
- Coordinates: 38°34′50″N 119°30′10″W
- Country: United States
- State: California
- County: Mono

Area
  - Total: 19.27 sq mi (49.90 km^{2})
  - Land: 19.27 sq mi (49.90 km^{2})
  - Water: 0 sq mi (0.00 km^{2})
- Elevation: 5,086 ft (1,550 m)

Population (2020)
  - Total: 419
  - Density: 22/sq mi (8.4/km^{2})
- Time zone: UTC-8 (Pacific)
  - Summer (DST): UTC-7 (PDT)
- ZIP code: 96107
- Area codes: 530
- FIPS code: 06-14484
- GNIS feature ID: 2582978

Coleville is an unincorporated community and census-designated place (CDP) in Mono County, California, United States. It is located at an elevation of 5,141 feet (1,567 m) in the Antelope Valley on the West Walker River. The population was 419 at the 2020 census, down from 495 at the 2010 census.

The ZIP Code is 96107, and the community is served by area code 530.

== History ==
The first post office at Coleville was established in 1868. The name honors Cornelius Cole, a United States senator. On June 1, 2007, the Larson fire threatened Coleville while burning 1,100 acres (450 ha) and causing US$3,000,000 damage.

Coleville is the hometown of General John Abizaid and the birthplace of trick shooter Lillian Smith.

== Geography ==
Coleville is one of the three northernmost communities in Mono County. It is bordered to the north by Topaz and to the south by Walker. U.S. Route 395 passes through the town, leading north 46 miles (74 km) to Carson City, Nevada, and southeast 26 miles (42 km) to Bridgeport, the Mono county seat. According to the Mono County government, Antelope Valley, including Coleville, is expected to see significant population growth.

According to the United States Census Bureau, the CDP covers an area of 19.3 square miles (50 km^{2}), all land.

=== Climate ===
The region experiences warm (but not hot) and dry summers, with no average monthly temperatures above 71.6 °F (22.0 °C). According to the Köppen Climate Classification system, Coleville has a warm-summer Mediterranean climate, abbreviated "Csb" on climate maps.

== Fire protection district ==
Coleville is served by the Antelope Valley Fire Protection District, founded in 1947 and covering 33 square miles (85 km^{2}) of the Antelope Valley. The District maintains a 12 acres (4.9 ha) training facility in Coleville.

== Water district ==
Coleville is served by the Antelope Valley Water District, which was formed in 1961.

== Education ==
Coleville is in the Eastern Sierra Unified School District. An elementary school and a high school (Coleville High School) are located in Coleville.

Due to Coleville's geographic isolation from other California schools, Coleville High competes in the Nevada Interscholastic Activities Association along with four other similarly isolated California schools.

Coleville also has a public library.

== Demographics ==
Historical population
Census	Pop.	Note	%±
2010	495		—
2020	419		−15.4%
U.S. Decennial Census; 2000 2010

=== 2020 census ===
As of the 2020 census, Coleville had a population of 419. The population density was 21.7 inhabitants per square mile (8.4/km^{2}). 0.0% of residents lived in urban areas, while 100.0% lived in rural areas. The census reported that 414 people (98.8% of the population) lived in households, 5 (1.2%) lived in non-institutionalized group quarters, and no one was institutionalized.

The age distribution was 129 people (30.8%) under the age of 18, 30 people (7.2%) aged 18 to 24, 149 people (35.6%) aged 25 to 44, 73 people (17.4%) aged 45 to 64, and 38 people (9.1%) who were 65 years of age or older. The median age was 29.3 years. For every 100 females, there were 93.1 males, and for every 100 females age 18 and over there were 93.3 males age 18 and over.

There were 150 households, of which 46.7% had children under the age of 18 living in them. Of all households, 63.3% were married-couple households, 6 (4.0%) were cohabiting couple households, 16.0% were households with a male householder and no spouse or partner present, and 16.7% were households with a female householder and no spouse or partner present. About 23.3% of all households were made up of individuals and 8.7% had someone living alone who was 65 years of age or older. The average household size was 2.76. There were 113 families (75.3% of all households).

There were 190 housing units at an average density of 9.9 units per square mile (3.8 units/km^{2}), of which 150 (78.9%) were occupied. Of these, 36 (24.0%) were owner-occupied, and 114 (76.0%) were occupied by renters. The homeowner vacancy rate was 7.3% and the rental vacancy rate was 7.1%.

Racial composition as of the 2020 census
Race	Number	Percent
White	318	75.9%
Black or African American	6	1.4%
American Indian and Alaska Native	19	4.5%
Asian	9	2.1%
Native Hawaiian and Other Pacific Islander	0	0.0%
Some other race	31	7.4%
Two or more races	36	8.6%
Hispanic or Latino (of any race)	104	24.8%

=== 2010 census ===
Coleville first appeared as a census designated place in the 2010 U.S. census.

== Government ==
In the California State Legislature, Coleville is in the 4th senatorial district, represented by Republican Marie Alvarado-Gil, and in the 8th Assembly district, represented by Republican David Tangipa.

In the United States House of Representatives, Coleville is in California's 3rd congressional district, represented by Independent Kevin Kiley.

The West Walker Motel

Andryss Motel

Craft shop in Coleville

Signs in Coleville

The Sierra Retreat Motel

== See also ==
- Topaz Lake
