= Eastern Sierra Unified School District =

School district in California

Address
- 231 Kingsley Street Bridgeport, California, 93517; United States

District information
- Type: Public
- Grades: K–12
- NCES District ID: 0611870

Students and staff
- Students: 400 (2020–2021)
- Teachers: 32.27 (FTE)
- Staff: 41.46 (FTE)
- Student–teacher ratio: 12.4:1

Other information
- Website: www.esusd.org

The Eastern Sierra Unified School District is a public school district in Mono County, California. The district is responsible for educating students within one of the largest geographical attendance areas of the 1,028 public schools in the state of California. The district has many school sites located throughout rural Mono County.

It oversees public education in the central, northern, and southeastern parts of the county, including the census-designated places of:

- Benton
- Bridgeport
- Chalfant
- Coleville
- June Lake
- Lee Vining
- Mono City
- Topaz
- Twin Lakes
- Virginia Lakes
- Walker

== Governance ==
The ESUSD Governance Team meets every third Wednesday of each month unless otherwise scheduled. Meeting Agenda can be found at each school site, the District Office, Community Post Offices and online.

Eastern Sierra Unified is governed by a five-member board of trustees.

- Penny Galvin 2022 - 2026 (Area 1)
- Steve Wright 2022 - 2024 (Area 2)
- Danielle Dublino 2020 - 2024 (Area 3)
- Ricky McCoy 2022 - 2026 (Area 4)
- Ann Aylesworth 2022 - 2026 (Area 5)

== Staff ==
The District Office is located in Bridgeport, CA.

The District Office Staff Includes:

- Heidi Torix - Superintendent
