= Caughlin Fire =

2011 Reno wildfire

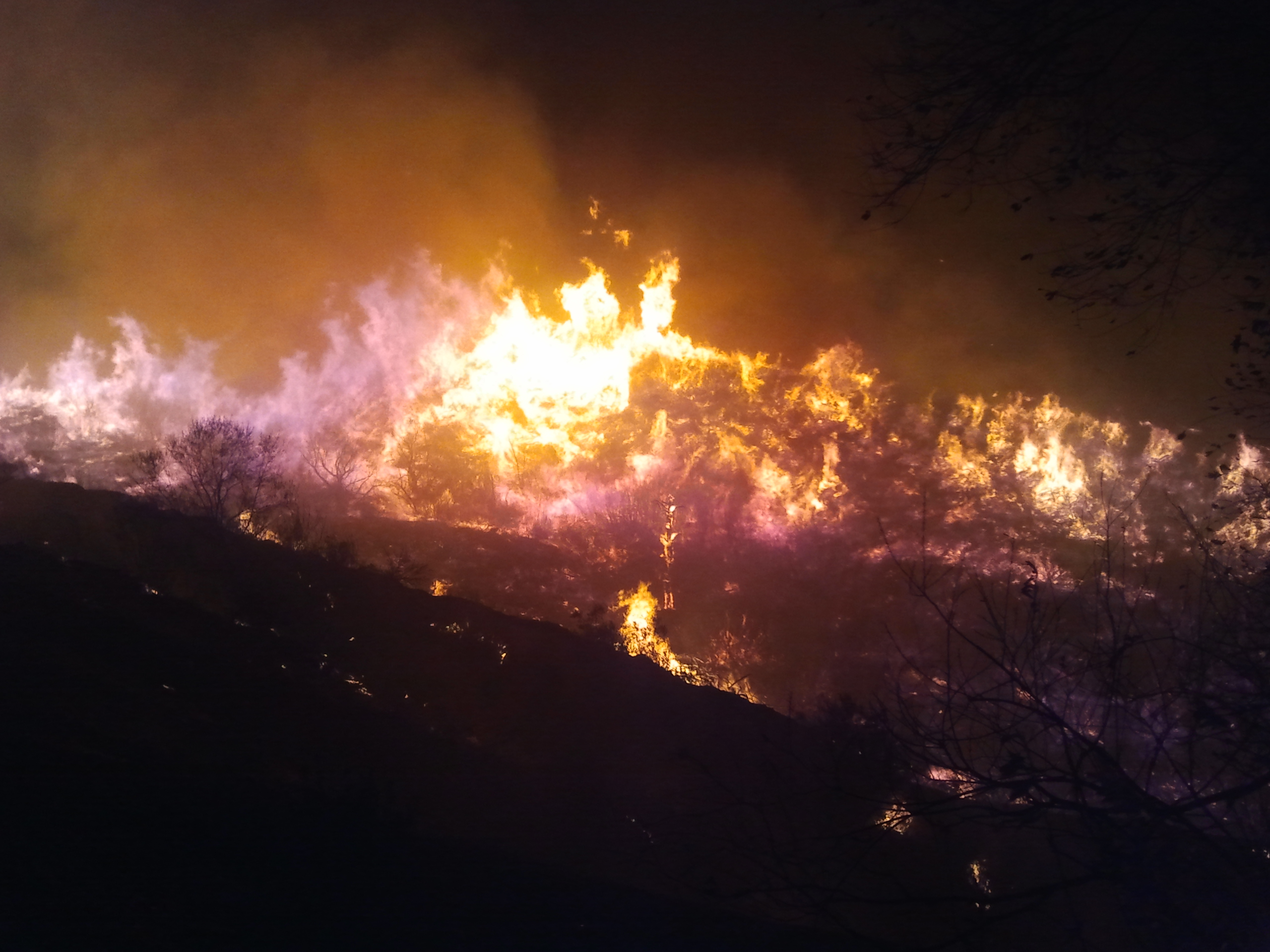
- The Caughlin Fire on November 18, 2011
- Date: November 18 -; November 20, 2011; (2 days)
- Location: Southwest Reno, Washoe County, Nevada

Statistics
- Burned area: 1,935 acres (783 ha)

Impacts
- Deaths: 1 civilian
- Injuries: 1 firefighter
- Evacuated: About 9,500
- Structures destroyed: 28

Ignition
- Cause: Tree branches blown downonto power lines

The Caughlin Fire was a short-lived wildfire that burned in Southwest Reno in November 2011. After igniting around midnight due to arcing power lines on November 18, 2011, the wind-driven fire burned 1,935 acres (783 ha), destroyed twenty-eight structures, and resulted in ten million dollars in damage. Dry and windy conditions allowed the fire to quickly spread, but firefighters were able to get a hold on the fire and contain it rather quickly on November 20 because of light precipitation and slackening winds.

== Background ==
November 2011 was a mostly dry month, with only two storm systems in the area. Overall, precipitation in the month was well below average. Winds from the latter of these storms assisted in lighting the Caughlin Fire. Additionally, a high pressure area was developing, which brought more warm and dry conditions. The fire’s rapid rate of spread was mainly due to the dry conditions and low fuel moistures.

The toll of destroyed structures was mainly because many people have been moving into the foothills of the Carson Range (a spur of the Sierra Nevada that stretches into Nevada) which are high in vegetation that fuel fires and make them spread quickly, creating a wildland-urban interface.

== Cause ==
On November 18, 2011, strong winds between twenty and thirty miles per hour that were gusting up to sixty miles per hour knocked down tree branches onto power lines, igniting dry brush below.

== Progression ==
Later November 18, a state of emergency was declared as the fire, which had been driven by wind, had already burned 400 acres and destroyed twenty structures. According to NV Energy, around 1,000 customers had lost power. Roughly 9,500 people were evacuated. However, later that day, the winds had been weakening and there was light snowfall in the area. These factors helped suppression efforts on the fire. By 10:20 P.M., power had been restored to all customers. At noon on November 19, residents were allowed to return home with valid identification, and the fire was 80% contained at 2 P.M. The Caughlin Fire was fully contained on November 20 after burning 1,935 acres (783 ha).

== Effects ==
Twenty-eight structures were destroyed by the fire, and there were $10 million (2011 USD) in total damages, including at least $7.6 million in property damage.

One firefighter was injured while fighting the fire. A 74-year-old man experienced cardiac arrest while evacuating.

The fire prompted evacuations in the Caughlin Ranch area, south to Zolezzi Lane and north to Caughlin Parkway. Several residential roads were closed, including South McCarran Boulevard. Because of the road closures, the United States Postal Service was unable to deliver to 6,000 postal customers.

According to NV Energy, up to 4,100 customers had no power during the fire.

== See also ==
- Pinehaven Fire
