= Cullen Creek =

Stream in Utah, United States

Coordinates: 38.3185857°N 112.3574300°W

Cullen Creek is a stream in Beaver County, Utah, United States.

Cullen Creek bears the name of Mat Cullen, a local prospector.

== See also ==
- List of rivers of Utah
