= Pinehaven Fire =

2020 Nevada wildfire

- Part of 2020 Nevada wildfires
- Date: November 17 -; November 20, 2020; (3 days)
- Location: Southwest Reno, Washoe County, Nevada

Statistics
- Burned area: 512 acres (207 ha; 2.07 km^{2})

Impacts
- Deaths: 0
- Injuries: 2 firefighters
- Structures destroyed: 5 destroyed, 21 damaged

Ignition
- Cause: Arcing power lines

The Pinehaven Fire was a small wildfire that burned in Southwest Reno, Nevada in November 2020. After igniting from arcing power lines on November 17, 2020, violent winds made the fire rapidly spread to 512 acres (207 ha).

After igniting on November 17, 2020, the fire rapidly grew because of strong winds and destroyed five structures and damaged twenty-one others. Evacuations were prompted for South Reno. The fire started very close to 2011's Caughlin Fire, so the rate of spread was slightly reduced as underbrush and plants had not fully regrown.

== Background ==
On November 17, 2020 a cold front was passing through the Reno-Sparks metropolitan area. There were strong downslope winds, and these factors together helped the Pinehaven Fire spread rapidly. These did not ignite the Pinehaven Fire, but just assisted in making the fire spread quickly. The fire was close to many buildings (and spread rapidly towards others) because residents had planted vegetation too close to their structures.

== Cause ==
Officials determined that the cause of the Pinehaven Fire was from arcing power lines. Sparks had ignited brush and plants below. The fire was then aided by strong winds in the area gusting up to 80 MPH.

A surveillance video from a casino roof five miles away confirmed that the fire was started by arcing power lines. The power lines did not touch, but the process was rather ionizing. There were no maintenance issues on the power lines. However, there was some conflict, as NV Energy stated that the fire started before the arcing power lines were caught on camera (around 1 P.M.) and the cause of the fire was likely a campfire escaping from its ring because of the windy events.

== Progression ==
The Pinehaven Fire was reported as a brush fire around 1:30 PM on November 17 near Pinehaven Road. Evacuations were ordered for the area, and South McCarran Boulevard was closed in both directions. One residential structure was burning by 14:22. More evacuations were issued and NV Energy cut power to parts of Caughlin Ranch by 15:13. An evacuation center opened at the Washoe County Senior Citizens Center. By 16:30, the fire was estimated at 1,500 acres (610 ha) and 500 structures were threatened, with several already destroyed. The fire's rapid rate of spread and proximity to structures influenced an emergency proclamation issued by Reno mayor Hillary Schieve and a state of emergency issued by Governor Steve Sisolak. Forward progress was stopped by 19:10, and the estimated size was 1,700 acres (690 ha). A state of emergency was issued later that evening.

On November 18, crews were mainly mopping up hot spots on the fire. Winds around 40 miles per hour (64 km/h) would hamper progress and efforts to control the fire. Despite this, fuels had not fully recovered from the Caughlin Fire, so the winds were not a major setback. Rain was expected in the area. Power was restored for effected areas that morning, and containment was 5%. Classes at Caughlin Elementary, Swope Middle School, and Reno High School were cancelled that day. Fire size decreased to 1,200 acres (490 ha), and several roads were reopened.

90% containment was reported on November 19, and all road closures and evacuations were rescinded. The Pinehaven Fire was declared fully contained in the morning hours of Friday, November 20 after burning 512 acres (207 ha). Eleven fire engines and one hand crew remained on scene.

== Effects ==
Governor Steve Sisolak and Mayor Hillary Schieve both signed emergency declarations.

=== Damage ===
Five structures, all residential, were destroyed by the fire, and twenty-one others were damaged. Several hotels offered discounted rates to evacuated residents. While fighting the fire, two firefighters were injured. One suffered an allergic reaction, while another tore their calf muscle.

Police officers had to stay around evacuated areas to ensure security of evacuated homes.

=== Closures and evacuations ===
About 1,300 houses were evacuated along South McCarran Boulevard and in the Caughlin Ranch area. The Washoe County School District cancelled classes at Caughlin Ranch Elementary School, Swope Middle School, and Reno High School for November 18, 2020.

== See also ==
- Caughlin Fire
- Wildfires in 2020
