= West Walker River =

River in California and Nevada, United States

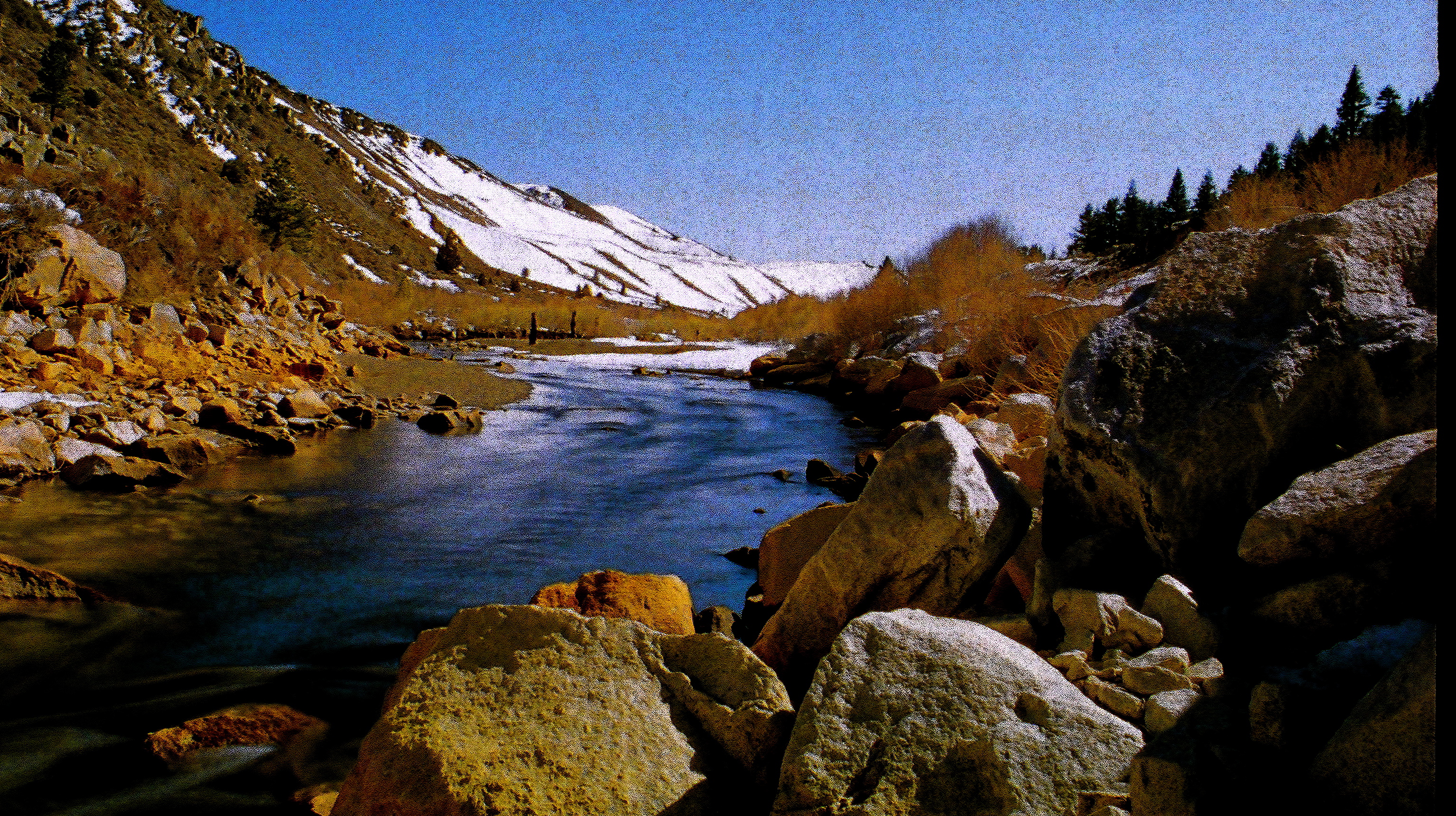
- West Walker River viewed near U.S. Highway 395

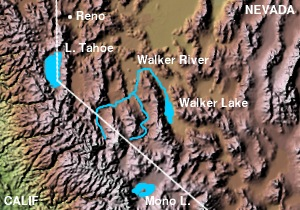
- Walker River, showing the West Walker and East Walker rivers

Location
- Country: United States
- State: California, Nevada

Physical characteristics
- Source: Sierra Nevada
  - location: California
  - coordinates: 38°08′24″N 119°30′28″W
  - elevation: 9,640 ft (2,940 m)
- Mouth: Walker River
  - location: Yerington, Nevada
  - coordinates: 38°53′35″N 119°10′44″W
  - elevation: 4,442 ft (1,354 m)
- Length: 95 mi (153 km)
- Basin size: 964 sq mi (2,500 km^{2})
- Discharge
  - location: Hudson, Nevada
  - average: 195 cu ft/s (5.5 m^{3}/s)
  - minimum: 10 cu ft/s (0.28 m^{3}/s)
  - maximum: 11,240 cu ft/s (318 m^{3}/s)

The West Walker River is a tributary of the Walker River, approximately 95 miles (153 km) long, in eastern California and western Nevada in the United States. It drains part of the Sierra Nevada range along the California-Nevada border in the watershed of Walker Lake in the Great Basin. The river derives its name from Joseph R. Walker, a mountain man.

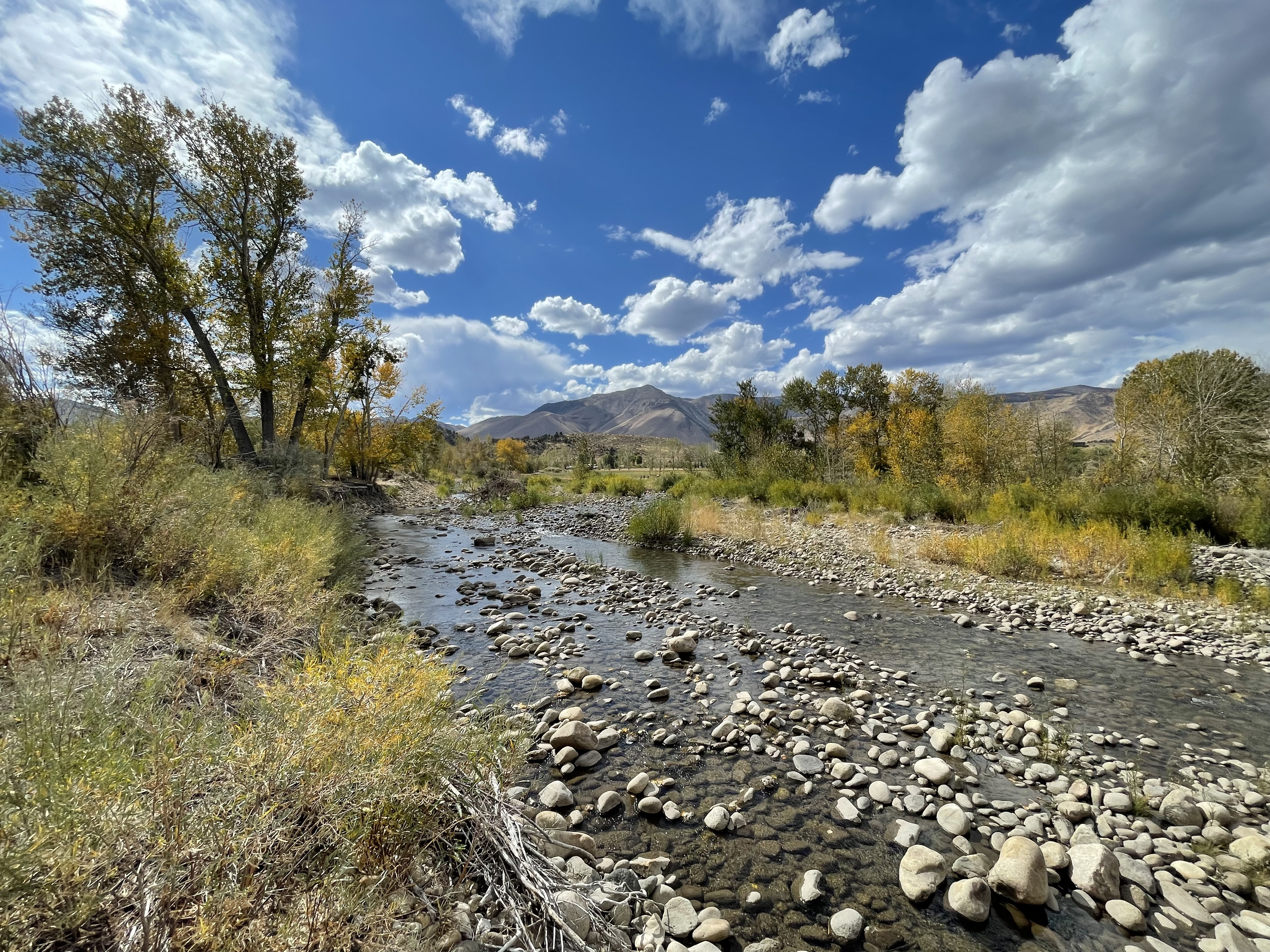
West Walker River near Coleville

It rises on the east side of the Sierra Nevada, north of Yosemite National Park in northwestern Mono County. Starting from snowfields on the faces of Tower Peak and Forsyth Peak in the Toiyabe National Forest, it flows down the Sierra, then north along the west side of the Sweetwater Mountains into the Antelope Valley, a ranching region around Walker. It flows north past Coleville and Topaz and enters southern Douglas County, Nevada southwest of Carson City. In Nevada it flows northeast, joining the East Walker River from the west 7 mi (11.3 km) south of Yerington to form the Walker River.

The river is heavily used for irrigation in the ranching valleys along its lower course. Its waters are diverted along its upper course to form Topaz Lake along the California-Nevada border. It receives the Little Walker River from the south near its source in the mountains.

U.S. Highway 395 passes through the West Walker River Valley, connecting it via Devil's Gate Pass to the East Walker River. Roads going over Sonora Pass and Monitor Pass lead from the valley into the Sierra Nevada. In January 1997, during the 1997 California New Years Floods, a record-setting flood along the West Walker River destroyed 10 miles (16 km) of U.S. Route 395 in the Walker River Canyon. This section of road was rebuilt in six months. The silt carried by the river settled in Topaz Lake, hurting the trout population there.

== See also ==
- List of rivers in the Great Basin
