= Topaz Lake =

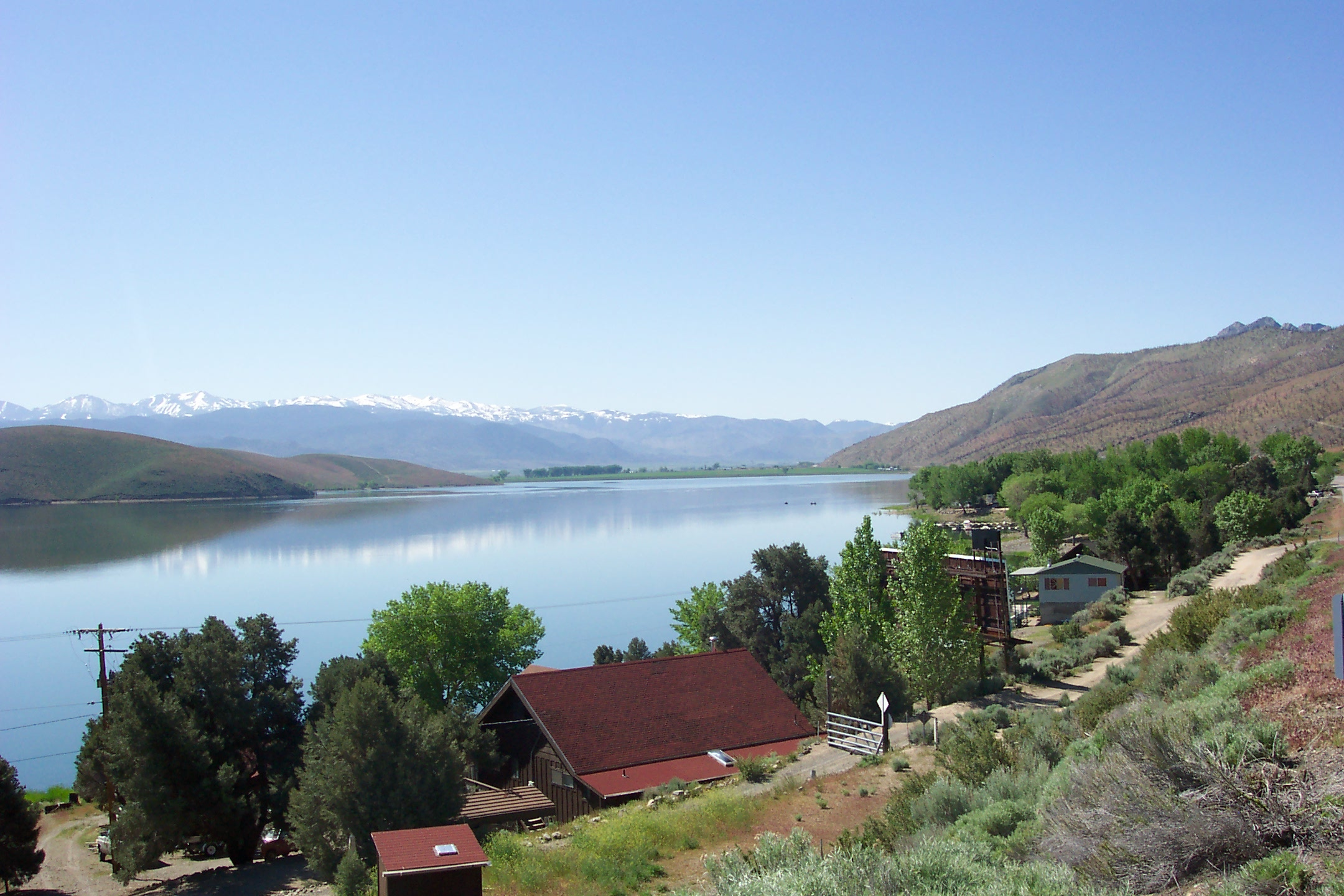
- from the Nevada side

- Location within Nevada Location within California Location within the United States
- Location: Douglas County, Nevada / Mono County, California
- Coordinates: 38.68°N 119.54°W
- Type: reservoir
- Primary inflows: West Walker River
- Primary outflows: West Walker River
- Basin countries: United States
- Max. length: 3.5 mi (5.6 km)
- Max. width: 1.5 mi (2.4 km)
- Surface area: 2,410 acres (980 ha)
- Average depth: 52.3 ft (15.9 m)
- Max. depth: 92 ft (28 m)
- Water volume: 126,000 acre⋅ft (0.155 km^{3})

Topaz Lake is a reservoir located on the California-Nevada border, about 75 miles (121 km) south of Reno. The census-designated place of Topaz Lake, Nevada, is located along its northwest shore.

The modern reservoir was formed by diverting waters from the West Walker River into a nearby basin that had previously contained a smaller, natural lake. That lake had historical significance since it lay on the route taken by American explorer Jedediah Smith in late spring of 1827 when leaving California at the end of his first journey, the first crossing ever of the Sierra Nevada by a non-native. Smith came southeast through Monitor Pass, then east past Topaz Lake into Nevada.

The initial dam construction took place in 1922, resulting in a reservoir with a capacity of 45,000 acre-feet (56,000,000 m^{3}). In 1937, a new levee raised the capacity to its current 59,600 acre⋅ft (73,500,000 m^{3}). Topaz Lake is a relatively large reservoir, with a maximum pool of 126,000 acre⋅ft (155,000,000 m^{3}), with 2,410 acres (9.8 km^{2}) surface, a length of 3.5 miles (5.6 km), a width of 1.5 mi (2.4 km), and a maximum depth of 92 ft (28 m). The levee and reservoir have been owned and operated by the Walker River Irrigation District since its construction.

Topaz Lake is popular for boaters, water-skiers, campers, and fishermen. Fishing season runs year-round, and the lake is stocked with trout by the Nevada Department of Wildlife and the California Department of Fish and Wildlife. The lake is easily reachable by U.S. Route 395. On the northwest shore of the lake is the Topaz Lodge and a residential area. There is also a volunteer fire station in the area.

U.S. Route 395 passes by the west side of the lake at the California-Nevada state line. The southeastern terminus of California State Route 89 is 3 miles (4.8 km) south of the state line. The western terminus of Nevada State Route 208 is 2 mi (3.2 km) north of the state line.

== See also ==
- List of lakes in California
- U.S. Route 395 in California
- U.S. Route 395 in Nevada
- Coleville, California
- Topaz, California
- Walker, Mono County, California
