= Topaz Lake, Nevada =

- Census-designated place
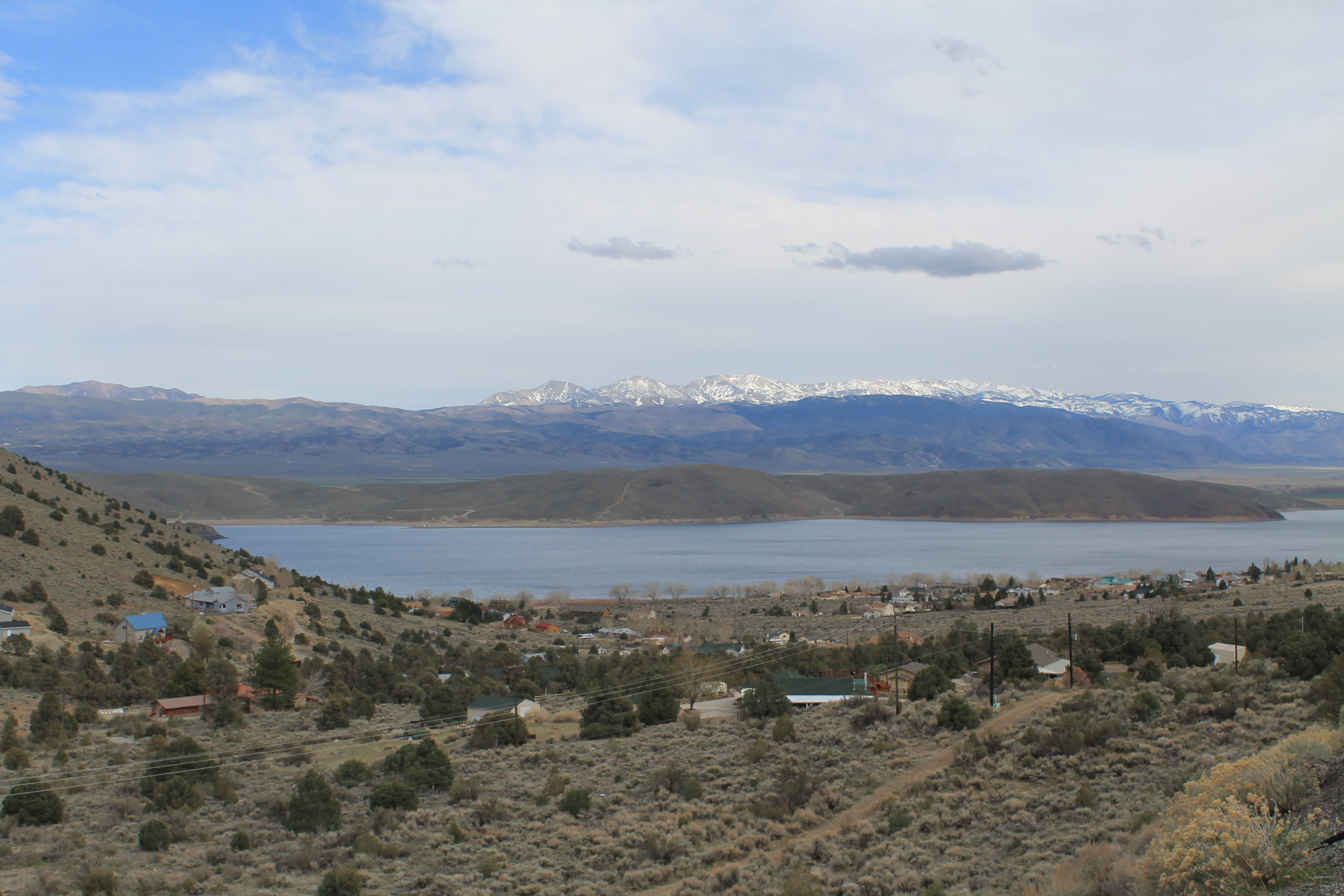
- Community of Topaz Lake in foreground, with lake beyond

- Location of Topaz Lake, Nevada
- Coordinates: 38°41′44″N 119°32′38″W
- Country: United States
- State: Nevada
- County: Douglas

Area
  - Total: 1.69 sq mi (4.39 km^{2})
  - Land: 1.24 sq mi (3.21 km^{2})
  - Water: 0.46 sq mi (1.18 km^{2})
- Elevation: 5,059 ft (1,542 m)

Population (2020)
  - Total: 202
  - Density: 162.8/sq mi (62.87/km^{2})
- Time zone: UTC-8 (Pacific (PST))
  - Summer (DST): UTC-7 (PDT)
- ZIP code: 89410
- Area code: 775
- FIPS code: 32-74200
- GNIS feature ID: 2583958

Topaz Lake is a census-designated place (CDP) in Douglas County, Nevada, United States. The population was 157 at the 2010 census.

== Geography ==
The CDP is located on the northwest shore of Topaz Lake just north of the California border. U.S. Route 395 runs through the community, leading north 37 miles (60 km) to Carson City and south 66 miles (106 km) to Mono Lake in California. According to the United States Census Bureau, the Topaz Lake CDP has a total area of 1.7 square miles (4.4 km^{2}), of which 1.2 square miles (3.1 km^{2}) is land and 0.50 square miles (1.3 km^{2}), or 29.87%, is water.

=== Climate ===
Climate data for Topaz Lake, Nevada (1991–2020 normals, extremes 1957–present)
Month	Jan	Feb	Mar	Apr	May	Jun	Jul	Aug	Sep	Oct	Nov	Dec	Year
Record high °F (°C)	73 (23)	75 (24)	82 (28)	89 (32)	97 (36)	105 (41)	105 (41)	102 (39)	99 (37)	94 (34)	78 (26)	75 (24)	105 (41)
Mean daily maximum °F (°C)	47.3 (8.5)	50.6 (10.3)	57.6 (14.2)	62.8 (17.1)	71.6 (22.0)	82.0 (27.8)	91.5 (33.1)	90.4 (32.4)	81.9 (27.7)	70.0 (21.1)	55.9 (13.3)	46.4 (8.0)	67.3 (19.6)
Daily mean °F (°C)	34.7 (1.5)	37.6 (3.1)	43.2 (6.2)	48.1 (8.9)	56.4 (13.6)	65.0 (18.3)	73.4 (23.0)	71.9 (22.2)	63.9 (17.7)	52.8 (11.6)	41.8 (5.4)	34.1 (1.2)	51.9 (11.1)
Mean daily minimum °F (°C)	22.1 (−5.5)	24.6 (−4.1)	28.8 (−1.8)	33.3 (0.7)	41.3 (5.2)	48.0 (8.9)	55.3 (12.9)	53.4 (11.9)	46.0 (7.8)	35.7 (2.1)	27.7 (−2.4)	21.9 (−5.6)	36.5 (2.5)
Record low °F (°C)	−17 (−27)	−5 (−21)	0 (−18)	7 (−14)	16 (−9)	27 (−3)	30 (−1)	29 (−2)	19 (−7)	9 (−13)	−1 (−18)	−14 (−26)	−17 (−27)
Average precipitation inches (mm)	0.59 (15)	0.44 (11)	1.13 (29)	0.35 (8.9)	0.60 (15)	0.11 (2.8)	0.33 (8.4)	0.26 (6.6)	0.19 (4.8)	0.25 (6.4)	0.67 (17)	1.00 (25)	5.92 (150)
Average snowfall inches (cm)	5.8 (15)	3.0 (7.6)	3.1 (7.9)	0.3 (0.76)	0.0 (0.0)	0.0 (0.0)	0.0 (0.0)	0.0 (0.0)	0.0 (0.0)	0.0 (0.0)	1.5 (3.8)	4.6 (12)	18.3 (46)
Average precipitation days (≥ 0.01 in)	2.7	2.4	3.1	2.1	3.1	1.0	1.7	2.0	1.3	1.2	2.3	4.6	27.5
Average snowy days (≥ 0.1 in)	1.6	2.0	0.9	0.3	0.0	0.0	0.0	0.0	0.0	0.0	0.7	2.5	8.0
Source: NOAA

== Demographics ==
Historical population
Census	Pop.	Note	%±
2010	157		—
2020	202		28.7%
U.S. Decennial Census
