= U.S. Route 395 =

Highway in the United States

U.S. Route 395
- Three Flags Highway
- US 395 highlighted in red

Route information
- Auxiliary route of US 95
- Length: 1,305 mi (2,100 km)
- Existed: November 11, 1926–present

Major junctions
- South end: I-15 in Hesperia, CA
- US 6 in Bishop, CA; I-580 / US 50 in Carson City, NV; I-80 in Reno, NV; US 20 in Burns, OR; US 26 in John Day, OR; I-84 / US 30 in Pendleton, OR; I-82 in Tri-Cities, WA; I-182 / US 12 in Tri-Cities, WA; I-90 in Ritzville, WA; I-90 / US 2 in Spokane, WA
- North end: Highway 395 at the Canadian border in Laurier, WA

Location
- Country: United States
- States: California, Nevada, Oregon, Washington

Highway system
- United States Numbered Highway System; List; Special; Divided

U.S. Route 395 (US 395), also known as U.S. Highway 395, is a north–south United States Numbered Highway that traverses the inland areas of the western states of California, Nevada, Oregon and Washington. It travels for over 1,300 miles (2,100 km) from a junction in the Mojave Desert at Interstate 15 (I-15) in Hesperia to the Canada–U.S. border in Laurier, Washington. Major cities along its route include Carson City and Reno in Nevada; Kennewick and Pasco in Washington's Tri-Cities region; and Spokane, Washington. US 395 is an auxiliary route of US 95 but never intersects its parent route, which runs further east.

Originally created on November 11, 1926 as a spur route of US 195, the highway was extended south from Spokane to San Diego in the 1930s. It was named the Three Flags Highway to recognize its role in linking Mexico, the United States and Canada. US 395 was truncated to its present southern terminus at Hesperia in 1964; its former alignment to San Diego was replaced by I-15, I-215 and other highways. Other sections were moved to freeways and bypasses of various cities, including I-82 between Oregon and Washington, I-90 in Eastern Washington and I-580 in Nevada. The highway generally follows the east side of the Sierra Nevada mountain range in California and Nevada and also traverses the High Desert of eastern Oregon and the Columbia Plateau in Washington.

== Route description ==
US 395 is a major north–south highway serving the inland regions of the West Coast states as well as northwestern Nevada. It was named the Three Flags Highway in the 1930s to promote its role in linking Mexico, the United States and Canada, though it never connected directly to Mexico.

=== California (southern segment) ===
The southern terminus of US 395 is an interchange with Interstate 15 (I-15) in Hesperia, California, a city southwest of Victorville. The highway travels north across the Mojave Desert and intersects State Route 58 (SR 58) at Kramer Junction near the town of Boron and east of Edwards Air Force Base. It continues across the desert, passing several solar farms, and crosses the El Paso Mountains and Summit Range near Johannesburg. US 395 veers northwest to bypass Ridgecrest, which is served by a business route, and merges with SR 14 near Indian Wells.

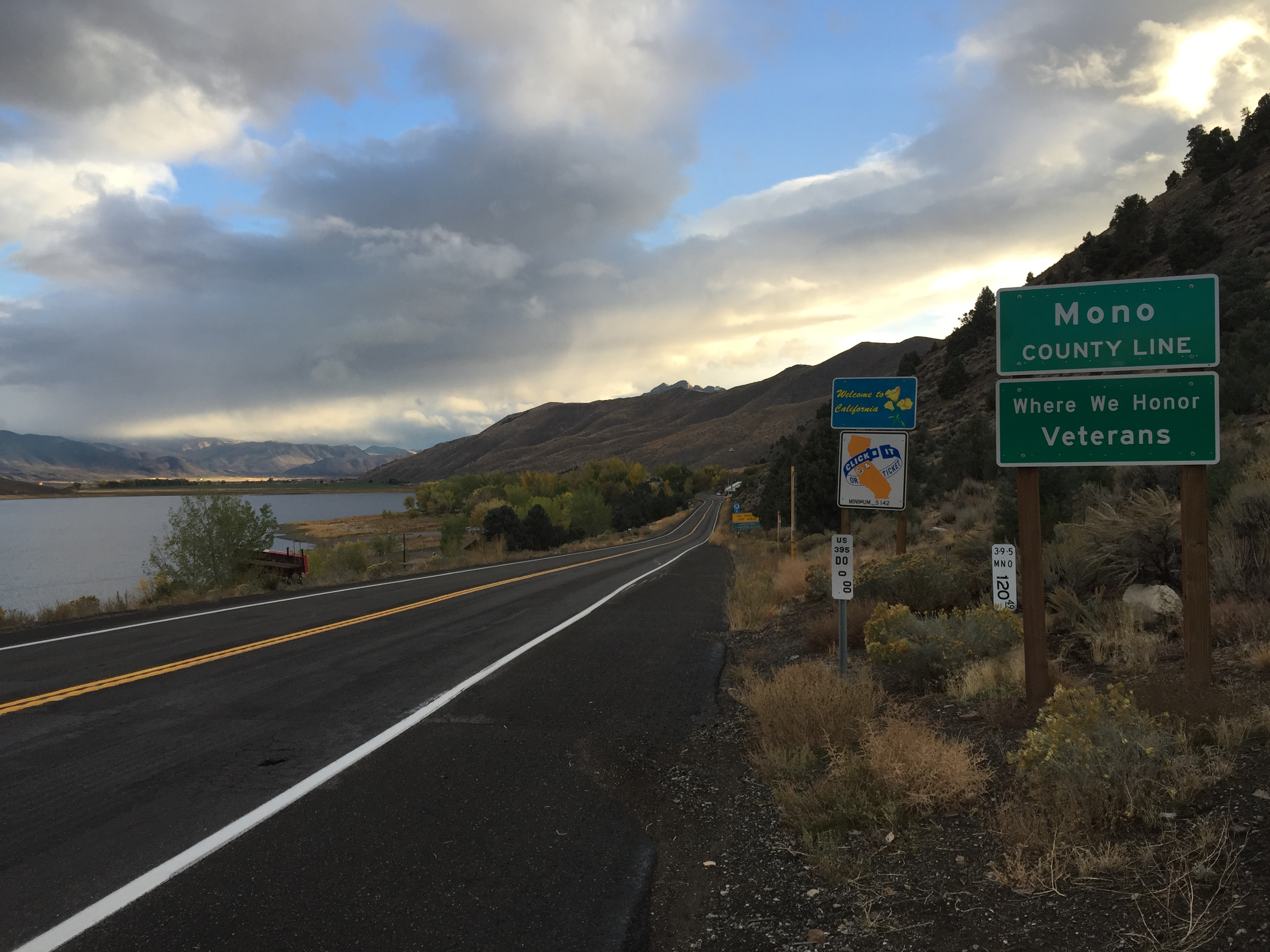
View south along U.S. Route 395 entering Mono County, California from Douglas County, Nevada, near Topaz Lake

The highway travels north through the Eastern Sierra region along the eastern escarpment of the Sierra Nevada mountain range and the western boundary of Naval Air Weapons Station China Lake, a large military reservation. US 395 continues through the Owens Valley and follows the Los Angeles Aqueduct, which it crosses several times; the highway is primarily four lanes in the area with several divided sections outside of cities. Around Owens Lake, US 395 intersects SR 190 and SR 136, which provide access to the west side of Death Valley National Park. The highway traverses Lone Pine and passes the Manzanar National Historic Site, which operated as a Japanese American internment center during World War II. US 395 turns north after passing through Independence and reaches Bishop, where it serves as the western terminus of US 6, a transcontinental highway.

From Bishop, US 395 turns northwest and heads closer to the Sierra Nevada foothills and serves roads that lead to ski areas and alpine towns, including Mammoth Mountain near Mammoth Lakes and June Mountain near June Lake. The highway ascends from the foothills into the Mono Basin and follows the western shore of Mono Lake to Lee Vining, where it is concurrent with SR 120, which traverses Yosemite National Park to the west. It then climbs Conway Summit to an elevation of 8,134 feet (2,479 m), the highest point on US 395. The highway turns west in Bridgeport and north near Fales Hot Springs to follow the West Walker River downstream into Antelope Valley. US 395 then follows the west side of Topaz Lake and exits California to enter Nevada.

=== Nevada ===
US 395 enters Nevada at Topaz Lake and descends into Carson Valley, where it serves as a major thoroughfare and connects several major cities in the state's western region. The highway travels northwest along the Carson River through the Washoe Tribe's Dresslerville Colony and the adjacent towns of Gardnerville and Minden. At a junction with State Route 88 in Minden, US 395 turns due north and becomes a four-lane divided highway as it approaches Carson City, the state's capital city. It travels around the east side of Carson City on a freeway that is shared with I-580 and US 50, which leaves near the city's airport.

I-580 and US 395 traverse a gap in the Carson Range and travel around the west side of Washoe Lake. The freeway crosses the Steamboat Hills and meanders as it enters the southern outskirts of Reno. It then travels through the city's suburban neighborhoods and along the west side of Reno–Tahoe International Airport before a junction with I-80 east of downtown and the University of Nevada, Reno campus. I-580 ends at the interchange, while US 395 continues on a freeway that gradually turns northwest as it leaves Reno. The freeway travels through a gap in the hills and re-enters California near the community of Cold Springs. The highway has been designated as the Martin Luther King Jr. Freeway from southern Reno to the California state line since 1998.

=== California (northern segment) ===
US 395 re-enters California in Eastern Sierra County and quickly enters Lassen County while generally travels northwest along the Sierra Nevada foothills. The four-lane expressway narrows to a two-lane undivided highway at Hallelujah Junction, where it intersects SR 70. The highway continues northwest to avoid Honey Lake and reaches an intersection with SR 36 near Susanville, where it turns east. US 395 travels around several mountains that dot the Modoc Plateau as it moves further away from the Sierra Nevada range and follows the Warner Mountains. The highway continues along the South Fork Pit River into the city of Alturas, where it serves as a main street until a junction with SR 299. US 395 and SR 299 travel concurrently and split northeast of Alturas in the foothills of the Warner Mountains. US 395 continues north along the shore of Goose Lake and reaches the Oregon state line in the community of New Pine Creek.

=== Oregon ===
US 395 enters Oregon at New Pine Creek, then heads north to Lakeview. At Lakeview, it overlaps Oregon Route 140 (OR 140) for five miles (8 km), then continues north to Valley Falls. At Valley Falls, it turns northeast through Wagontire to Riley. Near Riley, US 395 overlaps US 20 through Hines and Burns. Approximately two miles (3.2 km) northeast of Burns, US 395 turns north through Seneca and Canyon City to John Day. At John Day, it overlaps US 26 and heads west to Mount Vernon. At Mount Vernon, US 395 turns north through Long Creek and Pilot Rock to Pendleton. At Pendleton, it overlaps I-84 and US 30 west to Stanfield. At Stanfield, US 395 turns north through Hermiston to Umatilla. East of Umatilla, it overlaps US 730 and heads west to I-82. It then overlaps I-82 to the Washington state line at the Columbia River.

The entire route within Oregon was designated as the World War I Veterans Memorial Highway in 2015.

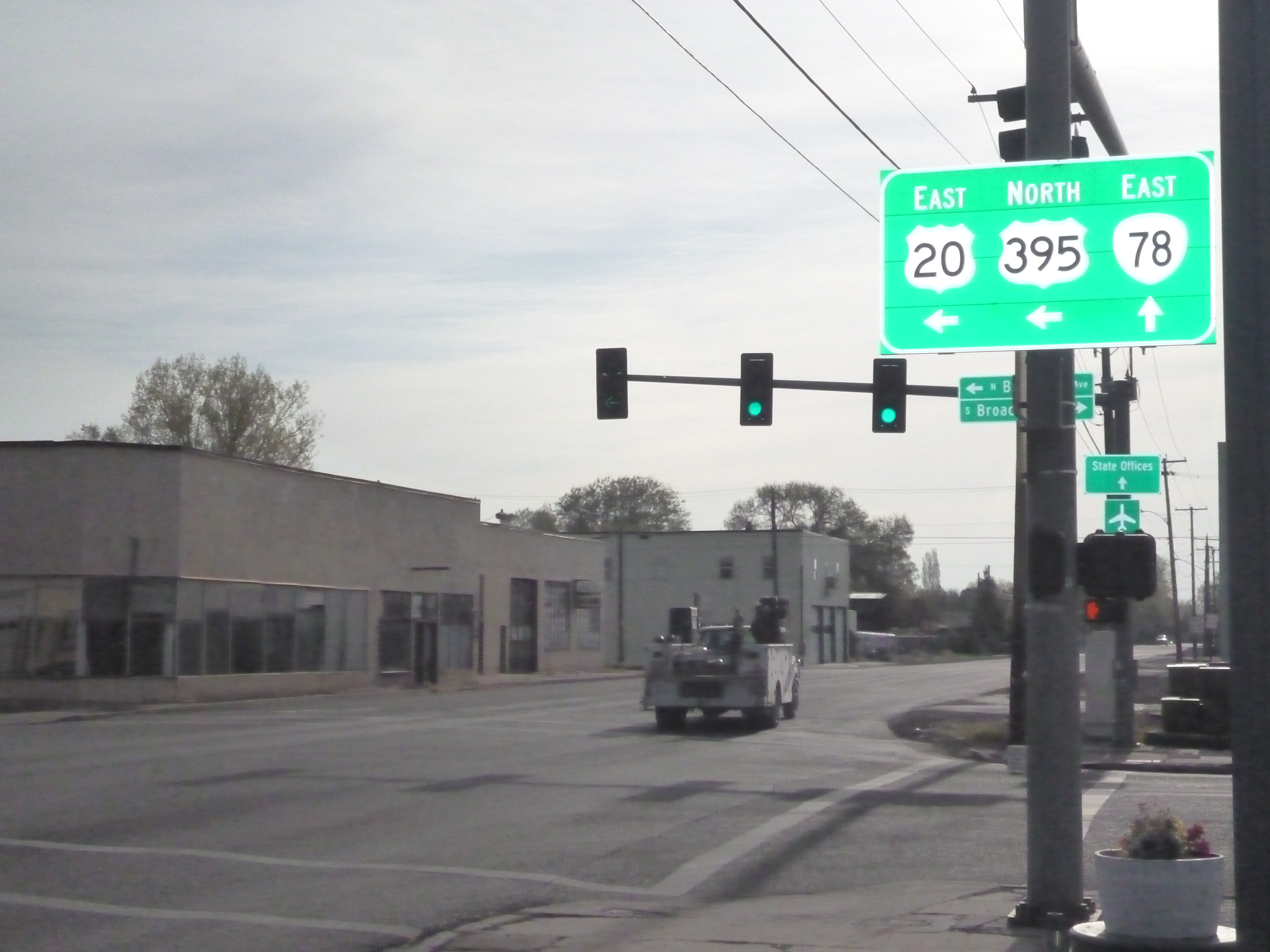
US 20 & US 395, Oregon Route 78 Intersection

=== Washington ===
US 395 enters Washington with I-82 on the Umatilla Bridge, which crosses the Columbia River near Plymouth. The freeway travels into the Tri-Cities area, where US 395 splits from I-82 to travel through Kennewick on city streets. The highway merges with State Route 240 (SR 240), a regional freeway, as it crosses the Columbia River on the Blue Bridge (officially the Pioneer Memorial Bridge). US 395 travels west of downtown Pasco on a short freeway and reaches a junction with I-182 and US 12, which it joins for two miles (3.2 km). The highway leaves Pasco and its concurrency with I-182 and US 12 and turns north into the rural Columbia Plateau.

The four-lane divided highway carries US 395 northeast around several small towns towards Ritzville, where it merges with I-90 and begins a 60-mile (97 km) concurrency. The freeway is joined by US 2 and intersects US 195 in the outskirts of Spokane. In downtown Spokane, US 2 and US 395 leave I-90 and travel north on Division Street, which is split into a pair of one-way streets.

US 395 currently runs north on Division Street to travel through Spokane. The Washington State Department of Transportation (WSDOT) is constructing the North Spokane Corridor, a new freeway that will run from I-90 (around the Thor/Freya exit) northward to the existing US 395 north of Wandermere. Construction on the new freeway began in 2003 and is scheduled to be completed in 2030; once complete, US 395 is planned to move to the new alignment while US 2 will stay on Division Street.

US 395 (along with US 2) proceeds north through Spokane as Division Street to the north edge of the city where they split; US 2 heading northeast to Idaho. US 395 then proceeds north through the towns of Deer Park, Clayton, Chewelah, Colville and Kettle Falls. It terminates at the Canada–US border where it meets British Columbia Highway 395.

== History ==
=== California ===
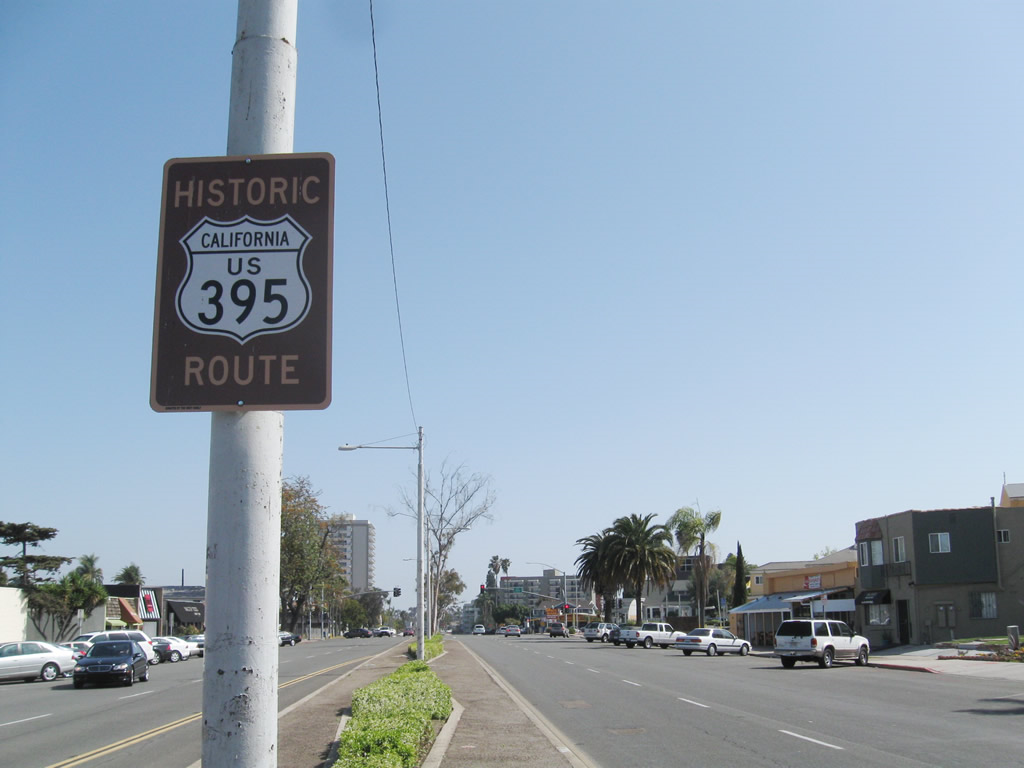
An Historic US 395 Route sign along El Cajon Blvd in San Diego

From c. 1934 to 1969, the southern terminus of US 395 was in downtown San Diego at US 101 (Harbor Drive) and Market Street. US 395 remained mostly intact during a highway renumbering in 1964, but was truncated to its present-day southern terminus in Hesperia by 1969. It was replaced by SR 163 from downtown San Diego to Miramar, where it was then replaced by modern-day I-15. US 395 had previously followed Park Blvd, El Cajon Blvd and Murphy Canyon Road through San Diego to Miramar prior to the construction of the Cabrillo Freeway through Balboa Park. It had also followed Pomerado Road through Poway prior to the construction of the freeway and entered Escondido along Centre City Parkway which today exists as a business route. From Escondido, there were two alignments that existed at different times. The original route followed Mission Road and Santa Fe Avenue into Vista (the old alignment of SR 78), then continued along Santa Fe Avenue, Vista Way. US 395 then followed SR 76 briefly before splitting off along Mission Road to Fallbrook and continued along this road out of Fallbrook. The newer route continued north more directly from Escondido, paralleling I-15 along several frontage roads (some sections of which are named "Old Highway 395") to bypass Vista and Fallbrook. Where the old and new routes met near Rainbow, US 395 then proceeded north near I-15 into Temecula. From Murrieta to Perris, there were two routes. The old route followed I-15 (which was SR 71 at the time) to Lake Elsinore, where it then turned along SR 74 to Perris. The new route followed I-215 from Murietta through Menifee to Perris. From Perris, US 395 was replaced by I-215 through Moreno Valley, Riverside and San Bernardino to Devore. Through the Cajon Pass, I-15 replaced US 395 up to its present-day southern terminus at I-15 in Hesperia (exit 141).

The state legislature passed a resolution in 2008 to recognize portions of Historic US 395; by 2011, over 100 signs had been installed by private groups along the former alignment, mostly in San Diego County.

During the 1950s, several sections of the highway were rebuilt or realigned by the California Division of Highways. Work to rebuild other two-lane sections has continued into the 21st century, with a 12.6-mile (20.3 km) bypass of Olancha near Owens Lake. As of 11 June 2025, all US 395 traffic is now on the newly constructed lanes of the highway.

Between 1992 and 2004, the 90-mile (140 km) section of US 395 between I-15 and Ridgecrest had over 2,000 collisions that injured 1,500 people and killed 150. The highway's lack of shoulders, blind hills and high speeds were cited as reasons for the frequency of collisions.

=== Oregon and Washington ===
US 395 was originally created on November 11, 1926 as a spur of US 195 between Spokane and the Canadian border. As a result, it never intersected its parent, US 95; US 195 always provided the connection. US 395 developed into a parallel of its parent route when it was extended south through Oregon in 1935. In Oregon, it replaced most of Oregon Route 11. The Washington section followed the northernmost section of the Inland Empire Highway, a state road that was developed in the 1910s.

Originally, US 395 didn't travel concurrently with I-82, or I-84. US 395 went north from Pendleton to Cold Springs Junction, currently Oregon Route 37. From there, US 395 traveled concurrently with US 730 and US 410 (until US 410 became US 12), passing through Wallula to enter Pasco from the southeast. The concurrency with I-84 and rerouting through Hermiston was made in 1972. The overlap with I-82 and rerouting through Kennewick was made in 1984. Also noteworthy, the US 395 route north of Pasco at Eltopia to Connell was relocated in 1980 from what is now known as Blanton Road, to a route further west that offered greater expansion into a divided 4-lane highway. Today, the entire route of US 395 from Pasco to Ritzville, WA is four lane divided but still with farm road crossings in places.

== Major intersections ==
California
I-15 in Hesperia
US 6 in Bishop
Nevada
US 50 in Carson City. The highways travel concurrently through Carson City.
I-580 / US 50 in Carson City. I-580/US 395 travels concurrently to Reno.
I-80 / I-580 in Reno
California
No major intersections
Oregon
US 20 in Riley. The highways travel concurrently to northeast of Burns.
US 26 in John Day. The highways travel concurrently to Mount Vernon.
I-84 in Pendleton. The highways travel concurrently to Stanfield.
US 30 in Pendleton. The highways travel concurrently to Stanfield.
US 730 in Umatilla. The highways travel concurrently through Umatilla.
I-82 / US 730 in Umatilla. I-82/US 395 travels concurrently to Kennewick, Washington.
Washington
I-182 / US 12 in Pasco. The highways travel concurrently through Pasco.
I-90 south of Ritzville. The highways travel concurrently to Spokane.
US 2 in Spokane. The highways travel concurrently through Spokane.
US 195 in Spokane
Highway 395 at the Canada–US border in Laurier
