= List of regions of Oregon =

This is a list of regions in the U.S. state of Oregon.

== List ==
Region	Location	Map	Principal communities	Population	Notes
Central Oregon	Deschutes, Crook, Jefferson counties		Bend, Redmond, Madras, Prineville	219,564 (2015 est.)	Minimal definition. Sometimes includes north to the Columbia River and south to the border with California.
Eastern Oregon	Baker, Grant, Harney, Malheur, Morrow, Umatilla, Union, Wallowa counties		Hermiston, Pendleton, La Grande, Ontario, Baker City	181,137 (2015 est.)	Minimal definition. Sometimes includes west to the Cascade Range.
Northwest Oregon	Clatsop, Columbia, and Tillamook counties		Astoria, St. Helens, Scappoose, Tillamook	113,084 (2015 est.)	Minimal definition. Sometimes includes parts of Washington County.
Southeastern Oregon/Oregon Outback	Harney, Klamath, Lake, and Malheur counties		Klamath Falls, Lakeview, Burns, Ontario	111,425 (2015 est.)	
Southern Oregon	Douglas, Jackson, Josephine, and Klamath counties		Medford, Grants Pass, Roseburg, Klamath Falls	471,013 (2015 est.)	Minimal definition. Sometimes includes Coos, Curry, and Lake counties.
Western Oregon	West of the Cascades, Lane County and north		Portland, Salem, Eugene	3,010,021 (2015 est.)	Minimal definition. Sometimes includes Southern Oregon. Area on the map highlighted in blue.
Applegate Valley	Southwestern Jackson and eastern Josephine counties along the Applegate River		Applegate, Ruch	Not available	
Cascade Range	Cascade Mountains		N/A	Not available	
Catlow Valley	Southwestern Harney County		Blitzen (formerly)	Not available	
Columbia Plateau	Northeastern area around the Columbia River		Hermiston, Hood River, Pendleton, The Dalles, Milton-Freewater	Not available	Area on the map highlighted in green. Partly in Washington.
Columbia River Gorge	Parts of Multnomah, Hood River, and Wasco counties		Hood River, The Dalles	Not available	
Eagle Valley	Eastern Baker County		Richland, New Bridge, Sparta	Not available	
French Prairie	Northern Marion County		Woodburn, Aurora, Butteville, Donald, Gervais, Hubbard, Saint Louis, St. Paul	Not available	
Goose Lake Valley	Southern Lake County		Lakeview	7,829 (Lake County 2015 est.)	Partly in California.
Harney Basin	Northern and central Harney County		Burns, Hines	7,200 (Harney County 2015 est.)	
High Desert	Southeastern Oregon		Bend, Burns, Lakeview, Prineville, Redmond	Not available	
Hood River Valley	Hood River County		Hood River	23,137 (Hood River County 2015 est.)	
Klamath Basin	Southern Klamath County		Klamath Falls, Altamont	66,016 (Klamath County 2015 est.)	Also extends into California.
Mount Hood Corridor	Clackamas County along U.S. 26		Government Camp, Mount Hood Village, Sandy	Not available	
Oregon Coast	Areas bordering the Pacific Ocean		Astoria, Tillamook, Lincoln City, Newport, Florence, Coos Bay, Brookings	Not available	Itself divided into three sub-regions, highlighted on map.
Portland metropolitan area	Area around Portland		Portland, Gresham, Hillsboro, Beaverton	1,918,394 (2015 est.)	Also includes parts of Southwest Washington
Rogue Valley	Along the Rogue River in Jackson and Josephine counties		Medford, Ashland, Grants Pass	297,312 (Jackson/Josephine counties, 2015 est.)	
Treasure Valley	Along the Snake River in northeastern Malheur County		Ontario, Nyssa, Vale	Not available	Mostly in Idaho.
Trout Creek Mountains	Southern Malheur and Harney counties		McDermitt	Not available	Partly in Nevada.
Tualatin Valley	Along the Tualatin River in Washington and Clackamas counties		Tigard, Tualatin, Sherwood, Beaverton, Aloha, Hillsboro, Forest Grove, West Linn	Not available	
Umpqua Valley	Douglas County		Roseburg	Not available	
Wallowa Valley	Wallowa County along the Wallowa River		Enterprise, Joseph, Lostine, Wallowa	6,856 (Wallowa County 2015 est.)	
Warner Valley	Southeastern Lake County around the Warner Lakes		Adel, Plush	Not available	
Willamette Valley	Area along the Willamette River		Portland, Salem, Albany, Corvallis, Eugene	Not available	

== See also ==
- List of ecoregions in Oregon
- List of regions of the United States
