= Geography of Oregon =

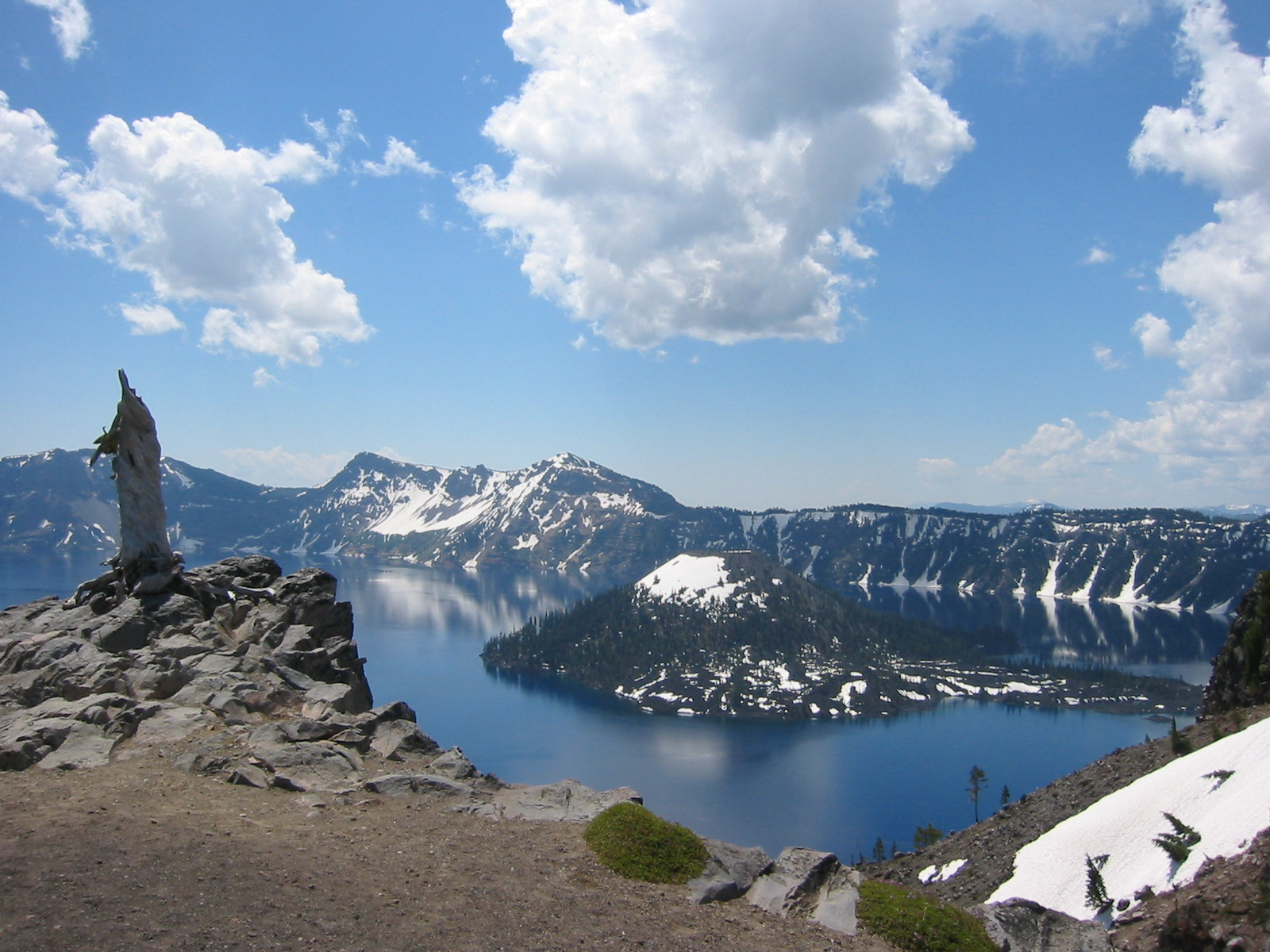
Crater Lake

Oregon is 295 miles (475 km) north to south at longest distance, and 395 miles (636 km) east to west. With an area of 98,381 square miles (254,810 km^{2}), Oregon is slightly larger than the United Kingdom. It is the ninth largest state in the United States. Oregon's highest point is the summit of Mount Hood, at 11,249 feet (3,429 m), and its lowest point is the sea level of the Pacific Ocean along the Oregon Coast. Oregon's mean elevation is 3,300 feet (1,006 m). Crater Lake National Park, the state's only national park, is the site of the deepest lake in the United States at 1,943 feet (592 m). Oregon claims the D River as the shortest river in the world, though the state of Montana makes the same claim of its Roe River. Oregon is also home to Mill Ends Park (in Portland), the smallest park in the world at 452 square inches (0.29 m^{2}).

Oregon is split into eight geographical regions. In Western Oregon: Oregon Coast (west of the Coast Range), the Willamette Valley, Rogue Valley, Cascade Range and Klamath Mountains; and in Central and Eastern Oregon: the Columbia Plateau, the High Desert, and the Blue Mountains.

Oregon lies in two time zones. Most of Malheur County is in the Mountain Time Zone, while the rest of the state lies in the Pacific Time Zone.

== Geology and terrain ==
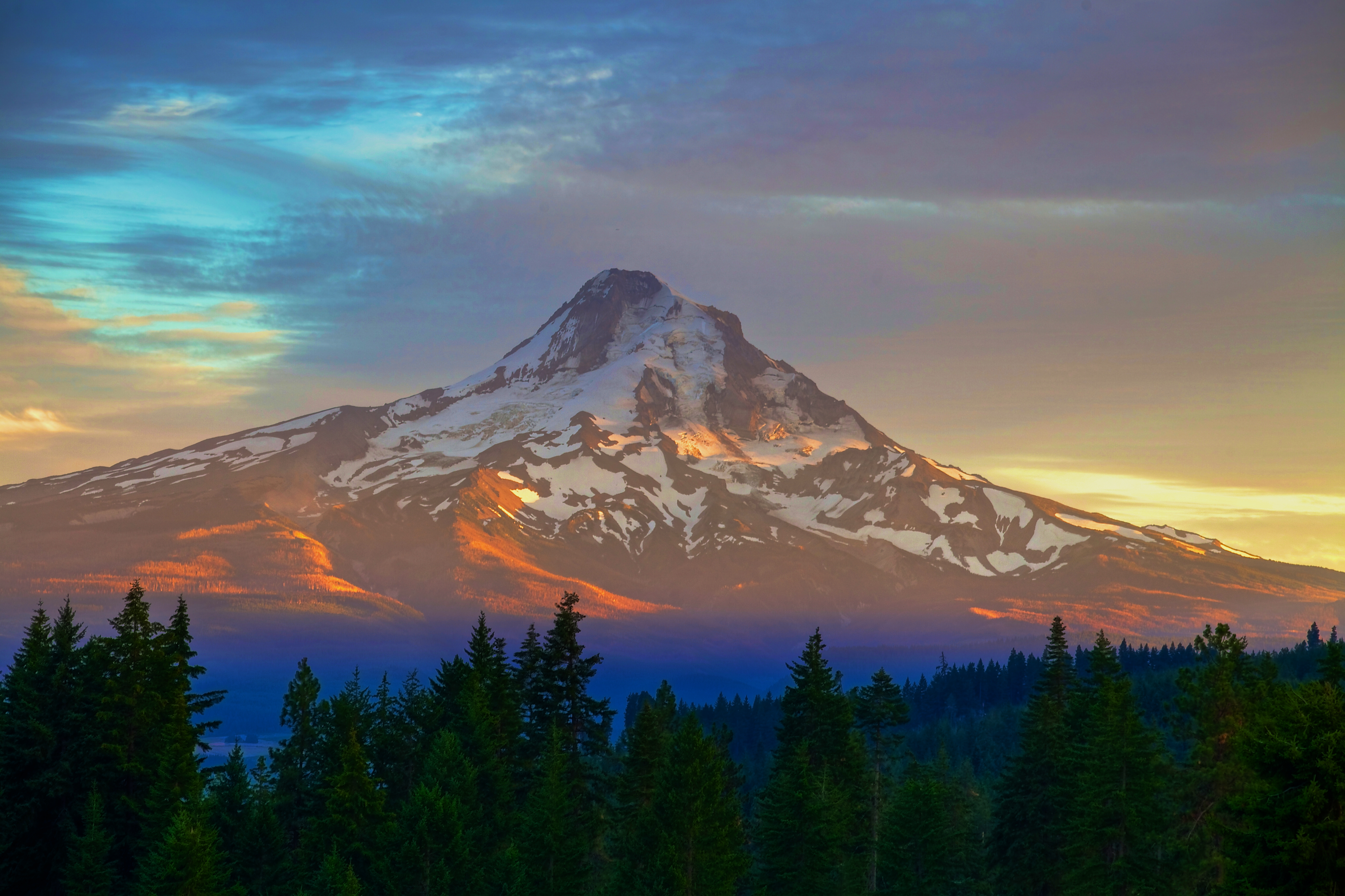
Mount Hood is the highest peak in Oregon.

Western Oregon's mountainous regions, home to three of the most prominent mountain peaks of the United States including Mount Hood, were formed by the volcanic activity of the Juan de Fuca Plate, a tectonic plate that poses a continued threat of volcanic activity and earthquakes in the region. The most recent major activity was the 1700 Cascadia earthquake. Washington's Mount St. Helens erupted in 1980, an event visible from northern Oregon and affecting some areas there.

The Columbia River, which forms much of Oregon's northern border, also played a major role in the region's geological evolution, as well as its economic and cultural development. The Columbia is one of North America's largest rivers, and one of two rivers to cut through the Cascades (the Klamath River in southern Oregon is the other). About 15,000 years ago, the Columbia repeatedly flooded much of Oregon during the Missoula Floods; the modern fertility of the Willamette Valley is largely the result. Plentiful salmon made parts of the river, such as Celilo Falls, hubs of economic activity for thousands of years.

Today, Oregon's landscape varies from rain forest in the Coast Range to barren desert in the southeast, which still meets the technical definition of a frontier. Oregon's geographical center is further west than any of the other 48 contiguous states (although the westernmost point of the lower 48 states is in Washington). Central Oregon's geographical features range from high desert and volcanic rock formations resulting from lava beds. The Oregon Badlands Wilderness is in this region of the state.

== Flora and fauna ==
Typical of a western state, Oregon is home to a unique and diverse array of wildlife. Roughly 60 percent of the state is covered in forest, while the areas west of the Cascades are more densely populated by forest, making up around 80 percent of the landscape. Some 60 percent of Oregon's forests are within federal land. Oregon is the top timber producer of the lower 48 states.

- Typical tree species include the Douglas fir (the state tree), as well as redwood, western juniper, ponderosa pine, western red cedar, and hemlock. The Western Junipers are very abundant in Eastern and Central Oregon, being an essential tree to the area. Ponderosa pine are more common in the Blue Mountains in the eastern part of the state and firs are more common in the west.

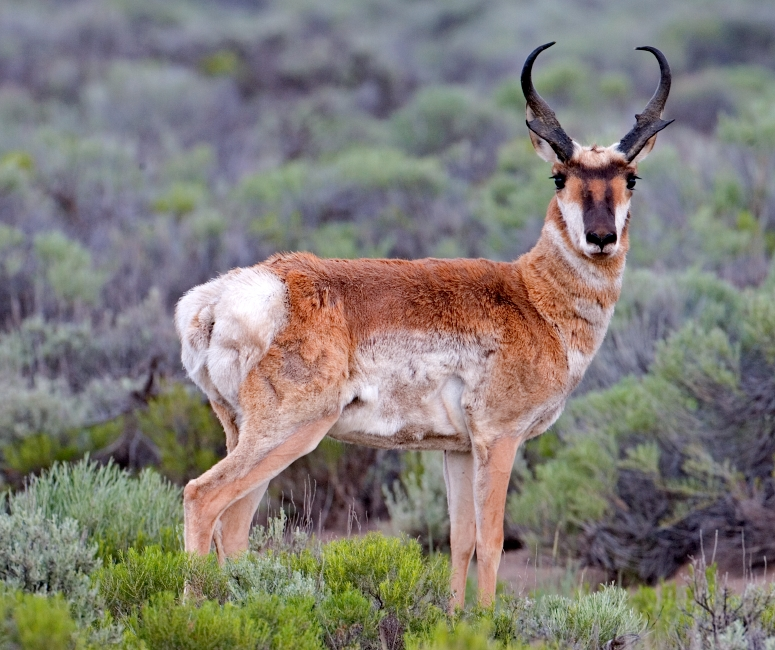
Antilocapra americana (Pronghorn antelope)

- Many species of mammals live in the state, which include opossums, shrews, moles, little pocket mice, great basin pocket mice, dark kangaroo mouse, California kangaroo rat, chisel-toothed kangaroo rat, ord's kangaroo rat, bats, rabbits, pikas, mountain beavers, chipmunks, squirrels, yellow-bellied marmots, beavers (the state mammal), porcupines, coyotes, wolves, foxes black bears, raccoons, badgers, skunks, antelopes, cougars, bobcats, lynxes, deer, elk, and moose.
- Marine mammals include seals, sea lions, humpback whales, killer whales, gray whales, blue whales, sperm whales, pacific white-sided dolphins, and bottlenose dolphins.
- Notable birds include American widgeons, mallard ducks, great blue herons, bald eagles, golden eagles, western meadowlarks (the state bird), barn owls, great horned owls, rufous hummingbirds, pileated woodpeckers, wrens, towhees, sparrows, and buntings.

Moose have not always inhabited the state but came to Oregon in the 1960s; the Wallowa Valley herd numbered about 60 as of 2013. Gray wolves were extirpated from Oregon around 1930 but have since found their way back; most reside in northeast Oregon, with two packs living in the south-central part. Although their existence in Oregon is unconfirmed, reports of grizzly bears still turn up, and it is probable some still move into eastern Oregon from Idaho.

Oregon is home to what is considered the largest single organism in the world, an Armillaria solidipes fungus beneath the Malheur National Forest of eastern Oregon.

Oregon has several National Park System sites, including Crater Lake National Park in the southern part of the Cascades, John Day Fossil Beds National Monument east of the Cascades, Lewis and Clark National Historical Park on the north coast, and Oregon Caves National Monument near the south coast.

== Climate ==
Köppen climate types in Oregon

Most of Oregon has a generally mild climate, though there is significant variation given the variety of landscapes across the state. The state's western region (west of the Cascade Range) has an oceanic climate, populated by dense evergreen mixed forests. Western Oregon's climate is heavily influenced by the Pacific Ocean; the western third of Oregon is very wet in the winter, moderately to very wet during the spring and fall, and dry during the summer. The relative humidity of Western Oregon is high except during summer days, which are semi-dry to semi-humid; Eastern Oregon typically sees low humidity year-round.

The state's southwestern portion, particularly the Rogue Valley, has a Mediterranean climate with drier and sunnier winters and hotter summers, similar to Northern California.

Oregon's northeastern portion has a steppe climate, and its high terrain regions have a subarctic climate. Like Western Europe, Oregon, and the Pacific Northwest in general, is considered warm for its latitude, and the state has far milder winters at a given elevation than comparable latitudes elsewhere in North America, such as the Upper Midwest, Ontario, Quebec and New England. However, the state ranks fifth for coolest summer temperatures of any state in the country, after Maine, Idaho, Wyoming, and Alaska.

The eastern two thirds of Oregon, which largely comprise high desert, have cold, snowy winters and very dry summers. Much of the east is semiarid to arid like the rest of the Great Basin, though the Blue Mountains are wet enough to support extensive forests. Most of Oregon receives significant snowfall, but the Willamette Valley, where 60 percent of the population lives, has considerably milder winters for its latitude and typically sees only light snowfall.

Oregon's highest recorded temperature is 119 °F (48 °C) at Pendleton on August 10, 1898, and the lowest recorded temperature is −54 °F (−48 °C) at Seneca on February 10, 1933.

=== Climate data ===
Climate data for Portland (Köppen Csb/Csa) (Note: Recorded at (PDX), 1991–2020 normals, snow days 1981-2010, extremes 1940–present) (Note: Official records for Portland have been kept at PDX since October 13, 1940. In January 1996, snow measurements for PDX were moved to the NWS Portland office 4 mi (6.4 km) to the east at 5241 NE 122nd Avenue, Portland, OR 97230-1089.)
Month	Jan	Feb	Mar	Apr	May	Jun	Jul	Aug	Sep	Oct	Nov	Dec	Year
Record high °F (°C)	66 (19)	71 (22)	80 (27)	90 (32)	100 (38)	116 (47)	107 (42)	107 (42)	105 (41)	92 (33)	73 (23)	65 (18)	116 (47)
Mean maximum °F (°C)	58.1 (14.5)	60.1 (15.6)	69.6 (20.9)	78.4 (25.8)	86.8 (30.4)	91.7 (33.2)	96.7 (35.9)	96.7 (35.9)	91.2 (32.9)	77.6 (25.3)	63.8 (17.7)	58.3 (14.6)	100.0 (37.8)
Mean daily maximum °F (°C)	47.5 (8.6)	51.5 (10.8)	56.8 (13.8)	62.0 (16.7)	69.3 (20.7)	74.3 (23.5)	81.9 (27.7)	82.3 (27.9)	76.7 (24.8)	64.4 (18.0)	53.5 (11.9)	46.9 (8.3)	63.9 (17.7)
Mean daily minimum °F (°C)	36.2 (2.3)	36.8 (2.7)	39.7 (4.3)	43.7 (6.5)	49.4 (9.7)	54.1 (12.3)	58.5 (14.7)	58.9 (14.9)	54.1 (12.3)	46.7 (8.2)	40.6 (4.8)	36.2 (2.3)	46.2 (7.9)
Mean minimum °F (°C)	25.1 (−3.8)	25.9 (−3.4)	30.4 (−0.9)	34.8 (1.6)	40.5 (4.7)	47.3 (8.5)	52.3 (11.3)	51.7 (10.9)	45.7 (7.6)	35.9 (2.2)	29.2 (−1.6)	24.9 (−3.9)	20.8 (−6.2)
Record low °F (°C)	−2 (−19)	−3 (−19)	19 (−7)	29 (−2)	29 (−2)	39 (4)	43 (6)	44 (7)	34 (1)	26 (−3)	13 (−11)	6 (−14)	−3 (−19)
Average precipitation inches (mm)	5.03 (128)	3.68 (93)	3.97 (101)	2.89 (73)	2.51 (64)	1.63 (41)	0.50 (13)	0.54 (14)	1.52 (39)	3.42 (87)	5.45 (138)	5.77 (147)	36.91 (938)
Average snowfall inches (cm)	1.7 (4.3)	1.2 (3.0)	0.1 (0.25)	0 (0)	0 (0)	0 (0)	0 (0)	0 (0)	0 (0)	0 (0)	0.04 (0.10)	1.3 (3.3)	4.3 (11)
Average precipitation days (≥ 0.01 in)	18.6	15.5	17.7	17.2	13.0	9.1	3.6	3.6	6.6	13.5	18.3	19.2	155.8
Average snowy days (≥ 0.1 in)	0.7	1.5	0.2	0	0	0	0	0	0	0	0.5	1.5	4.4
Average relative humidity (%)	80.9	78.0	74.6	71.6	68.7	65.8	62.8	64.8	69.4	77.9	81.5	82.7	73.2
Average dew point °F (°C)	33.6 (0.9)	36.1 (2.3)	38.3 (3.5)	40.8 (4.9)	45.3 (7.4)	49.8 (9.9)	52.9 (11.6)	53.8 (12.1)	50.7 (10.4)	46.2 (7.9)	40.3 (4.6)	35.1 (1.7)	43.6 (6.4)
Mean monthly sunshine hours	85.6	116.4	191.1	221.1	276.1	290.2	331.9	298.1	235.7	151.7	79.3	63.7	2,340.9
Percentage possible sunshine	30	40	52	54	60	62	70	68	63	45	28	23	52
Average ultraviolet index	1	2	3	5	6	7	8	7	5	3	2	1	4
Source 1: NOAA (relative humidity, dewpoint and sun 1961–1990)
Source 2: Weather Atlas (UV index)

Climate data for Salem (Köppen Csb)
Month	Jan	Feb	Mar	Apr	May	Jun	Jul	Aug	Sep	Oct	Nov	Dec	Year
Record high °F (°C)	68 (20)	72 (22)	80 (27)	93 (34)	100 (38)	119 (48)	108 (42)	108 (42)	104 (40)	93 (34)	74 (23)	72 (22)	119 (48)
Mean maximum °F (°C)	59.4 (15.2)	61.9 (16.6)	70.3 (21.3)	77.6 (25.3)	87.3 (30.7)	93.8 (34.3)	100.1 (37.8)	100.4 (38.0)	92.6 (33.7)	77.8 (25.4)	64.1 (17.8)	59.0 (15.0)	103.2 (39.6)
Mean daily maximum °F (°C)	48.4 (9.1)	52.1 (11.2)	57.8 (14.3)	62.6 (17.0)	71.0 (21.7)	76.6 (24.8)	85.5 (29.7)	85.6 (29.8)	78.5 (25.8)	65.8 (18.8)	53.6 (12.0)	47.4 (8.6)	65.4 (18.6)
Daily mean °F (°C)	42.1 (5.6)	44.0 (6.7)	48.0 (8.9)	51.8 (11.0)	58.7 (14.8)	63.7 (17.6)	70.3 (21.3)	70.2 (21.2)	64.5 (18.1)	54.8 (12.7)	46.3 (7.9)	41.3 (5.2)	54.6 (12.6)
Mean daily minimum °F (°C)	35.8 (2.1)	35.9 (2.2)	38.3 (3.5)	41.0 (5.0)	46.3 (7.9)	50.8 (10.4)	55.1 (12.8)	54.8 (12.7)	50.6 (10.3)	43.9 (6.6)	39.0 (3.9)	35.1 (1.7)	43.9 (6.6)
Mean minimum °F (°C)	23.9 (−4.5)	24.1 (−4.4)	27.7 (−2.4)	31.1 (−0.5)	35.2 (1.8)	41.5 (5.3)	47.0 (8.3)	46.7 (8.2)	41.0 (5.0)	32.1 (0.1)	26.3 (−3.2)	21.8 (−5.7)	17.7 (−7.9)
Record low °F (°C)	−10 (−23)	−4 (−20)	12 (−11)	23 (−5)	25 (−4)	32 (0)	35 (2)	30 (−1)	26 (−3)	19 (−7)	9 (−13)	−12 (−24)	−12 (−24)
Average precipitation inches (mm)	6.08 (154)	4.54 (115)	4.35 (110)	3.12 (79)	2.25 (57)	1.25 (32)	0.25 (6.4)	0.39 (9.9)	1.46 (37)	3.47 (88)	5.95 (151)	6.97 (177)	40.08 (1,018)
Average precipitation days (≥ 0.05 in)	13.8	11.2	11.7	9.5	6.3	4.2	1.1	1.5	3.2	9.4	12.2	14.1	98.2
Mean monthly sunshine hours	77.6	117.9	200.3	238.1	281.7	295.2	350.3	318.8	253.1	171.0	86.2	73.5	2,463.7
Source: NOAA (extremes 1893–present)

Climate data for Eugene (Köppen Csb) (Note: 1991–2020 normals. Mean monthly maxima and minima (i.e. the highest and lowest temperature readings during an entire month or year) calculated based on data at said location from 1991 to 2020.)
Month	Jan	Feb	Mar	Apr	May	Jun	Jul	Aug	Sep	Oct	Nov	Dec	Year
Record high °F (°C)	69 (21)	78 (26)	80 (27)	89 (32)	95 (35)	111 (44)	106 (41)	108 (42)	103 (39)	94 (34)	76 (24)	68 (20)	111 (44)
Mean maximum °F (°C)	60.2 (15.7)	61.9 (16.6)	69.8 (21.0)	76.3 (24.6)	83.4 (28.6)	89.7 (32.1)	97.6 (36.4)	97.8 (36.6)	92.2 (33.4)	78.5 (25.8)	65.8 (18.8)	59.1 (15.1)	100.6 (38.1)
Mean daily maximum °F (°C)	48.1 (8.9)	51.5 (10.8)	56.6 (13.7)	61.3 (16.3)	68.1 (20.1)	74.2 (23.4)	84.0 (28.9)	84.3 (29.1)	78.0 (25.6)	64.9 (18.3)	53.2 (11.8)	46.8 (8.2)	64.3 (17.9)
Daily mean °F (°C)	41.4 (5.2)	43.3 (6.3)	46.9 (8.3)	50.7 (10.4)	56.1 (13.4)	60.9 (16.1)	67.8 (19.9)	67.9 (19.9)	62.9 (17.2)	53.4 (11.9)	45.5 (7.5)	40.6 (4.8)	53.1 (11.7)
Mean daily minimum °F (°C)	34.7 (1.5)	35.0 (1.7)	37.2 (2.9)	40.0 (4.4)	44.0 (6.7)	47.6 (8.7)	51.7 (10.9)	51.5 (10.8)	47.8 (8.8)	41.8 (5.4)	37.7 (3.2)	34.3 (1.3)	41.9 (5.5)
Mean minimum °F (°C)	22.7 (−5.2)	24.6 (−4.1)	28.5 (−1.9)	31.8 (−0.1)	34.5 (1.4)	38.3 (3.5)	44.3 (6.8)	43.3 (6.3)	38.5 (3.6)	29.2 (−1.6)	24.9 (−3.9)	21.9 (−5.6)	17.1 (−8.3)
Record low °F (°C)	−4 (−20)	−3 (−19)	18 (−8)	25 (−4)	28 (−2)	32 (0)	39 (4)	35 (2)	30 (−1)	17 (−8)	12 (−11)	−10 (−23)	−10 (−23)
Average precipitation inches (mm)	6.05 (154)	4.67 (119)	4.64 (118)	3.32 (84)	2.46 (62)	1.23 (31)	0.32 (8.1)	0.39 (9.9)	1.39 (35)	3.17 (81)	5.98 (152)	7.21 (183)	40.83 (1,037)
Average snowfall inches (cm)	0.8 (2.0)	2.4 (6.1)	trace	0 (0)	0 (0)	0 (0)	0 (0)	0 (0)	0 (0)	0 (0)	0.2 (0.51)	1.5 (3.8)	4.9 (12)
Average precipitation days (≥ 0.01 in)	17.9	14.9	17.7	14.5	11.7	7.9	3.1	3.2	5.4	11.4	17.9	17.9	143.5
Average snowy days (≥ 0.1 in)	0.7	1.2	0.1	0	0	0	0	0	0	0	0.1	0.9	3.0
Mean monthly sunshine hours	133.3	115.8	167.4	201	254.2	270.0	337.9	341	276.0	167.4	138.0	130.2	2,532.2
Average ultraviolet index	2	2	3	3	4	5	6	5	4	3	2	2	3
Source 1: NOAA
Source 2: Weather Atlas (UV)

Climate data for Medford (Köppen Csa)
Month	Jan	Feb	Mar	Apr	May	Jun	Jul	Aug	Sep	Oct	Nov	Dec	Year
Record high °F (°C)	71 (22)	79 (26)	86 (30)	96 (36)	103 (39)	115 (46)	115 (46)	114 (46)	110 (43)	99 (37)	82 (28)	72 (22)	115 (46)
Mean maximum °F (°C)	61.8 (16.6)	67.1 (19.5)	75.4 (24.1)	84.0 (28.9)	91.7 (33.2)	100.0 (37.8)	104.4 (40.2)	104.3 (40.2)	99.2 (37.3)	86.6 (30.3)	68.7 (20.4)	60.1 (15.6)	106.5 (41.4)
Mean daily maximum °F (°C)	48.2 (9.0)	54.2 (12.3)	59.4 (15.2)	64.6 (18.1)	73.9 (23.3)	81.5 (27.5)	91.6 (33.1)	91.1 (32.8)	84.3 (29.1)	70.1 (21.2)	54.0 (12.2)	46.1 (7.8)	68.3 (20.2)
Daily mean °F (°C)	40.4 (4.7)	44.1 (6.7)	48.3 (9.1)	52.8 (11.6)	60.4 (15.8)	66.9 (19.4)	75.1 (23.9)	74.5 (23.6)	67.7 (19.8)	56.1 (13.4)	45.2 (7.3)	39.4 (4.1)	55.9 (13.3)
Mean daily minimum °F (°C)	32.5 (0.3)	33.9 (1.1)	37.2 (2.9)	41.0 (5.0)	46.9 (8.3)	52.3 (11.3)	58.6 (14.8)	57.9 (14.4)	51.2 (10.7)	42.1 (5.6)	36.4 (2.4)	32.6 (0.3)	43.6 (6.4)
Mean minimum °F (°C)	22.1 (−5.5)	23.7 (−4.6)	27.1 (−2.7)	31.3 (−0.4)	34.6 (1.4)	42.5 (5.8)	50.1 (10.1)	49.3 (9.6)	41.8 (5.4)	30.6 (−0.8)	23.7 (−4.6)	21.2 (−6.0)	18.4 (−7.6)
Record low °F (°C)	−3 (−19)	6 (−14)	14 (−10)	21 (−6)	28 (−2)	31 (−1)	38 (3)	39 (4)	29 (−2)	18 (−8)	10 (−12)	−10 (−23)	−10 (−23)
Average precipitation inches (mm)	2.72 (69)	1.96 (50)	1.81 (46)	1.51 (38)	1.34 (34)	0.68 (17)	0.24 (6.1)	0.33 (8.4)	0.48 (12)	1.22 (31)	2.61 (66)	3.53 (90)	18.43 (468)
Average snowfall inches (cm)	1.0 (2.5)	1.2 (3.0)	0.2 (0.51)	0 (0)	0 (0)	0 (0)	0 (0)	0 (0)	0 (0)	0 (0)	0.1 (0.25)	0.9 (2.3)	3.4 (8.6)
Average precipitation days (≥ 0.05 in)	10.6	8.8	8.7	6.8	4.6	3.0	0.8	1.1	2.4	4.9	9.8	12.0	73.5
Average snowy days (≥ 0.1 in)	1.3	1.1	0.6	0	0	0	0	0	0	0	0.4	1.7	5.1
Mean monthly sunshine hours	95.4	117.9	157.9	198.7	235.5	302.1	395.7	366.5	284.9	182.7	96.1	86.6	2,520
Source 1: NOAA
Source 2: weatherspark

Climate data for Burns (Köppen BSk/Dsb) (Note: 1991-2020 normals)
Month	Jan	Feb	Mar	Apr	May	Jun	Jul	Aug	Sep	Oct	Nov	Dec	Year
Record high °F (°C)	58 (14)	67 (19)	76 (24)	86 (30)	94 (34)	102 (39)	107 (42)	103 (39)	102 (39)	91 (33)	71 (22)	61 (16)	107 (42)
Mean maximum °F (°C)	47.3 (8.5)	51.5 (10.8)	64.9 (18.3)	75.3 (24.1)	84.9 (29.4)	91.0 (32.8)	97.1 (36.2)	96.5 (35.8)	90.4 (32.4)	79.5 (26.4)	62.2 (16.8)	48.2 (9.0)	98.4 (36.9)
Mean daily maximum °F (°C)	36.7 (2.6)	41.7 (5.4)	51.1 (10.6)	58.1 (14.5)	68.2 (20.1)	76.7 (24.8)	88.7 (31.5)	87.2 (30.7)	78.2 (25.7)	63.1 (17.3)	47.3 (8.5)	36.4 (2.4)	61.1 (16.2)
Mean daily minimum °F (°C)	16.3 (−8.7)	20.2 (−6.6)	26.3 (−3.2)	29.8 (−1.2)	37.4 (3.0)	42.6 (5.9)	48.6 (9.2)	45.8 (7.7)	37.4 (3.0)	28.0 (−2.2)	22.1 (−5.5)	15.5 (−9.2)	30.8 (−0.7)
Mean minimum °F (°C)	−5.3 (−20.7)	−0.9 (−18.3)	12.4 (−10.9)	17.8 (−7.9)	22.1 (−5.5)	28.4 (−2.0)	35.3 (1.8)	32.8 (0.4)	23.3 (−4.8)	13.0 (−10.6)	4.0 (−15.6)	−6.5 (−21.4)	−13.3 (−25.2)
Record low °F (°C)	−27 (−33)	−28 (−33)	−14 (−26)	10 (−12)	13 (−11)	21 (−6)	25 (−4)	22 (−6)	17 (−8)	−7 (−22)	−17 (−27)	−30 (−34)	−30 (−34)
Average precipitation inches (mm)	1.33 (34)	0.95 (24)	0.96 (24)	0.94 (24)	1.27 (32)	0.73 (19)	0.29 (7.4)	0.25 (6.4)	0.38 (9.7)	0.77 (20)	1.02 (26)	1.52 (39)	10.41 (265.5)
Average snowfall inches (cm)	11.1 (28)	7.8 (20)	5.0 (13)	2.0 (5.1)	0.5 (1.3)	0 (0)	0 (0)	0 (0)	0 (0)	1.1 (2.8)	5.4 (14)	11.7 (30)	44.6 (113)
Average precipitation days (≥ 0.01 in)	10.5	9.8	11.0	9.3	9.1	5.8	2.9	3.2	3.5	6.0	11.1	11.4	93.6
Average snowy days (≥ 0.1 in)	6.0	5.6	4.3	1.4	0.4	0	0	0	0	0.8	5.3	7.3	31.1
Source 1: NOAA
Source 2: NOAA NCEI

== Cities and towns ==
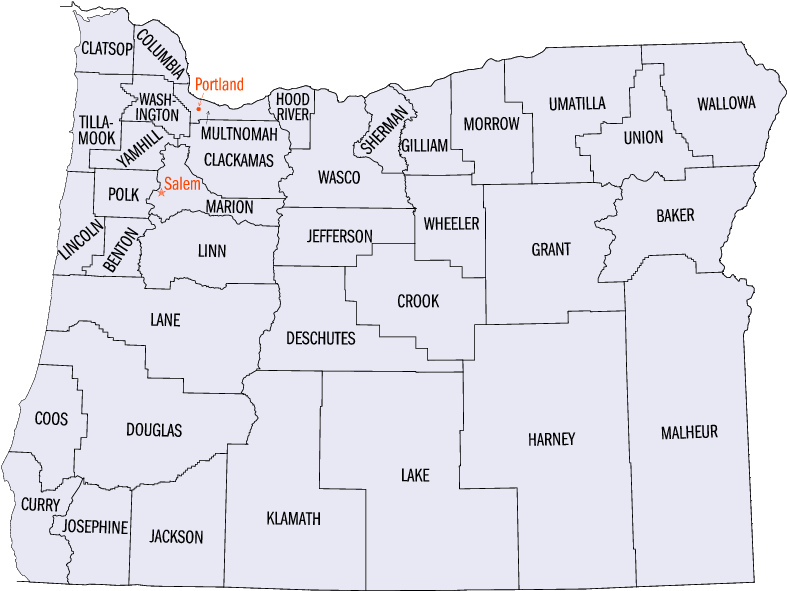
A map of the counties of Oregon with the cities of Salem and Portland.

Oregon's population is largely concentrated in the Willamette Valley, which stretches from Eugene in the south (home of the University of Oregon) through Corvallis (home of Oregon State University) and Salem (the capital) to Portland (Oregon's largest city).

Astoria, at the mouth of the Columbia River, was the first permanent English-speaking settlement west of the Rockies in what is now the United States. Oregon City, at the end of the Oregon Trail, was the Oregon Territory's first incorporated city, and was its first capital from 1848 until 1852, when the capital was moved to Salem. Bend, near the geographic center of the state, is one of the ten fastest-growing metropolitan areas in the United States. In southern Oregon, Medford is a rapidly growing metro area and is home to the Rogue Valley International-Medford Airport, the state's third-busiest airport. To the south, near the California border, is the city of Ashland. Eastern Oregon is sparsely populated, but is home to Hermiston, which with a population of 18,000 is the largest and fastest-growing city in the region.

Largest cities or towns in Oregon Source:
Rank	Name	County	Pop.
1	Portland	Multnomah	647,805
2	Salem	Marion	169,798
3	Eugene	Lane	168,916
4	Gresham	Multnomah	111,053
5	Hillsboro	Washington	106,894
6	Beaverton	Washington	97,514
7	Bend	Deschutes	94,520
8	Medford	Jackson	81,780
9	Springfield	Lane	62,353
10	Corvallis	Benton	57,961

== See also ==
- List of regions of Oregon
- Geography of Washington (state)
- Cascadia (region)
- Peninsulas of Oregon
