= The Honeycombs (Oregon) =

Rock formations in Oregon, U.S.

Coordinates: 43.45678°N 117.31236°W

The Honeycombs is a canyon containing a series of rock formations located on the eastern shore of Owyhee Lake in Malheur County, Oregon, north of Leslie Gulch and about 31 miles south of Vale, Oregon. The area is administered by the Bureau of Land Management, though a nearby campground on Bensley Flat is on Bureau of Reclamation land.

== Geology ==
The rock formations include pillars of volcanic basalt, lava domes made of rhyolite, volcanic ash beds, and exposed layers of sedimentary rock, including sandstone and shale. The most famous rock formations in the area are the tuff pillars, which have tafoni weathering patterns. These rock formations were produced by lava flows from a deep mantle plume during the Miocene.

== Research Natural Area ==
The 6,143-hectare (23.72 sq mi) Honeycombs Research Natural Area, established in 1985, is located around the Honeycombs. Its elevation ranges from 975 to 1,310 metres (3,199 to 4,298 ft). The main plant community is sagebrush and bunchgrass. The area was established to protect Wyoming big sagebrush (Artemisia tridentata) and needle-and-thread grass (Hesperostipa comata). Other flora of the area include shadscale (Atriplex confertifolia), greasewood (Sarcobatus), sterile milkvetch (Astragalus sterilis), grimy ivesia (Ivesia rhypara var. rhypara), Ertter's senecio (Senecio ertterae), and Owyhee clover (Trifolium owyheense). Fauna of the area include a herd of bighorn sheep, and the wild horses of the Three Fingers Wild Horse Herd Management Area, which overlaps with the Honeycombs area.

== Access ==
The Honeycombs are accessible by boat from Owyhee Lake. A 4WD road leads to the northeast of them along Juniper Ridge, and further access is by foot following a mustang trail along the ridge to the head of the canyon.
