= William Packwood =

American politician

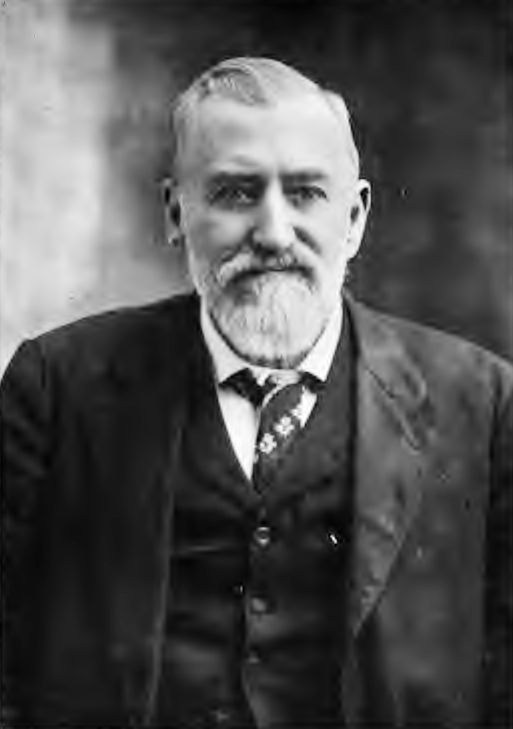

Member of the Oregon Constitutional Convention
- In office 1857–1857
- Constituency: Curry County

Personal details
- Born: William Henderson Packwood; October 23, 1832 Mount Vernon, Illinois
- Died: September 21, 1917 (aged 84) Baker City, Oregon
- Spouse: Johanna A. O'Brien

William Henderson Packwood (October 23, 1832 – September 21, 1917) was an American politician who served at the Oregon Constitutional Convention in 1857. A United States Army veteran from the state of Illinois, he was also a school superintendent and acquaintance of President Abraham Lincoln. He was an early resident of Baker City in Eastern Oregon.

== Early life ==
William Packwood was born near the community of Mount Vernon, Illinois, to Larkin Canada Packwood and Elizabeth Cathcart on October 23, 1832. Packwood received two years of formal education and later moved to Springfield, Illinois where he knew future United States President Abraham Lincoln. In 1848 he enlisted in the U.S. Army with Company B of the U.S. Mounted Rifles. The following year Packwood and the company were sent to the newly created Oregon Territory and stationed at Fort Vancouver.

== Oregon ==
Packwood went to California when gold was discovered there, returning to Oregon in 1851 where he was transferred to Port Orford, Oregon to fight Native American uprisings. In 1853 he was discharged from the Army and became a gold miner for several years.

In 1854, he served as a lieutenant for a vigilante group called the Coos County Volunteers. In that role, he helped lead a massacre of the Nasomah band of the Coquille Indian Tribe. The Volunteers attacked while the Nasomah people were sleeping, killing between 15 and 21 people.

In 1855, Packwood served as captain of the Coquille Guards during the Rogue River Wars against Native Americans in Southern Oregon. In 1857, he represented Curry County in southwestern Oregon at the Oregon Constitutional Convention that met in Salem during August and September, and framed a constitution in anticipation of Oregon becoming a state. He was the youngest of the delegates at the convention.

Packwood then moved east of the Cascade Mountains to Eastern Oregon where he was involved with establishing the town of Auburn in 1862. Auburn was a gold-mining boomtown that was briefly the county seat of Baker County, and Packwood helped plat the town. There he served as the first school superintendent of Baker County in 1862. During the 1864 presidential election he campaigned for Abraham Lincoln in that county. Soon after, he was responsible for another Baker County town receiving the name of Sparta. In that town he and his family built and operated a boarding house until 1867.

== Later life and family ==
In later years Packwood mined, was an assistant postmaster, clerk for Baker City, and a police judge before retiring in 1910. In 1862, Packwood married Johanna A. O'Brien, with whom he would father five children. He is the great-grandfather of former United States Senator Robert Packwood. William Henderson Packwood died on September 21, 1917, in Baker City with interment at Mount Hope Cemetery. He was the last living member of the constitutional convention at his death.
