= Leslie Gulch =

Canyon in Malheur County, Oregon, United States

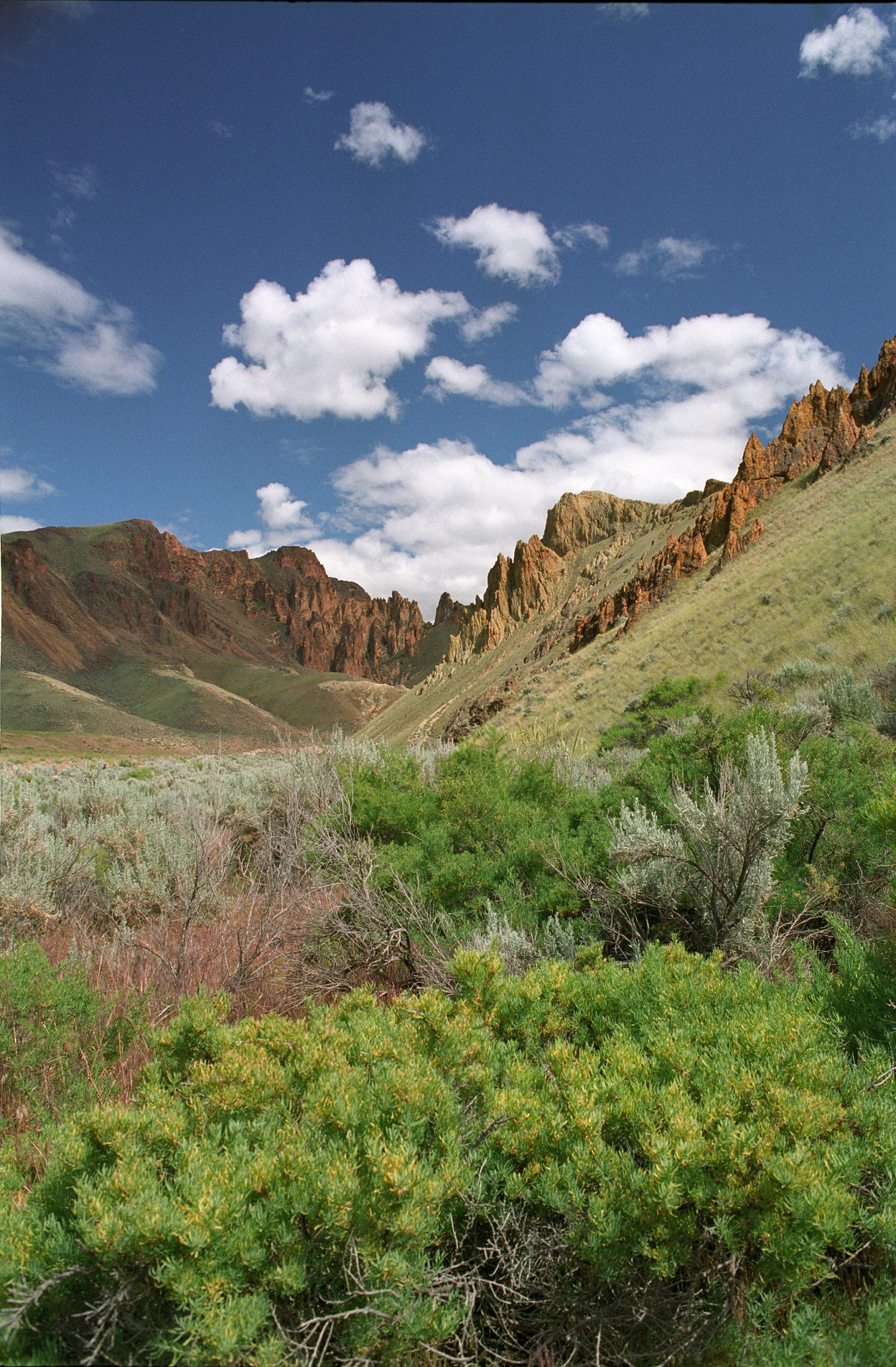
- Leslie Gulch landscape in the spring
- Interactive map of Leslie Gulch
- Location: Malheur County, Oregon, United States
- Coordinates: 43.3218237°N 117.3237707°W
- Elevation: 2,684 ft (818 m)

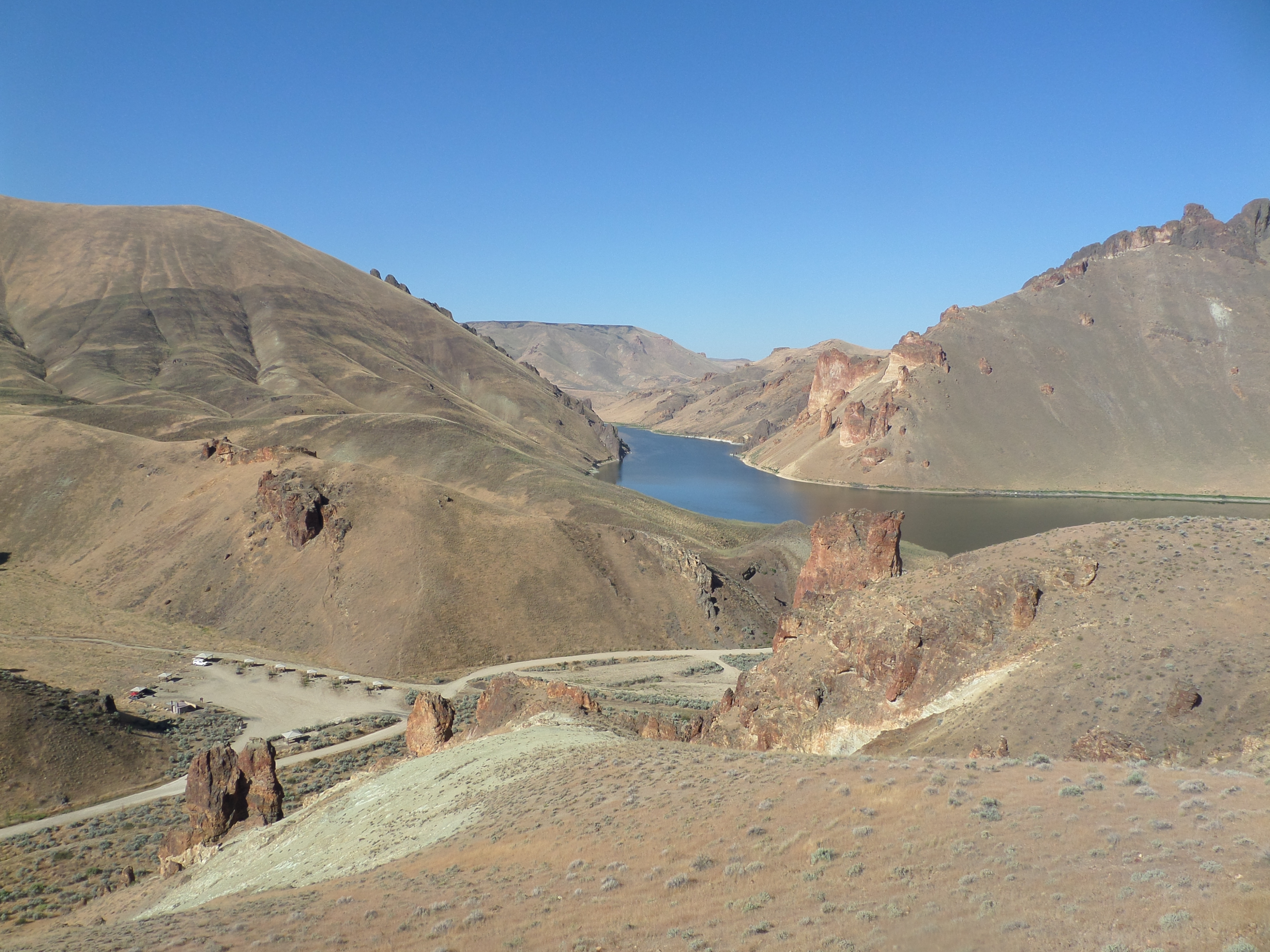
Owyhee Lake at the dead end of Leslie Gulch Road, with Slocum Creek Campground in left corner. July 2017.

Leslie Gulch is a canyon in Malheur County, Oregon, United States. It is on the east side of Owyhee Lake, a reservoir on the Owyhee River. Its abundant and striking rock formations are made of tuff.

The gulch was named after a local rancher, Hiram E. Leslie, who was hit by lightning here in 1882. Previously it had been called "Dugout Gulch."

== Management ==
The area is administered by the Bureau of Land Management (BLM).

At the end of the Leslie Gulch road at Owyhee Lake there is a boat launching ramp. At certain times of the year the water level is below the ramp which makes putting big boats in the lake impossible; smaller boats may have to be taken to the lake by hand. Nearby is the 10-unit Slocum Creek - Leslie Gulch Campground, operated by the BLM, which is open from March through November. The road to the campground is also prone to flash floods which can wash out the road in places.

== Flora ==
Two species of herbaceous plants are endemic to this drainage.

- Ertter's ragwort Senecio ertterae
- Packard's blazingstar Mentzelia packardiae

Other rare plants found here are grimy ivesia, sterile milkvetch, and Owyhee clover.

== Wildlife ==
A herd of bighorn sheep was established there in 1965. It now consists of more than 200 animals. Mule deer, coyotes, bobcats, Rocky Mountain elk, and rattlesnakes are also resident in the gulch.

Many species of birds live here, including quail, chukar, hawks and swifts.

== Rock climbing ==
The area's impressive rock formations have also drawn the interest of area rock climbers over the years. The volcanic tuff is very similar to, but not as solid as, the rock found at Oregon's more famous climbing area Smith Rock. There are more than 80 established climbing routes at Leslie Gulch. The majority of these routes are sport climbs but there are a few traditional climbs, as well.

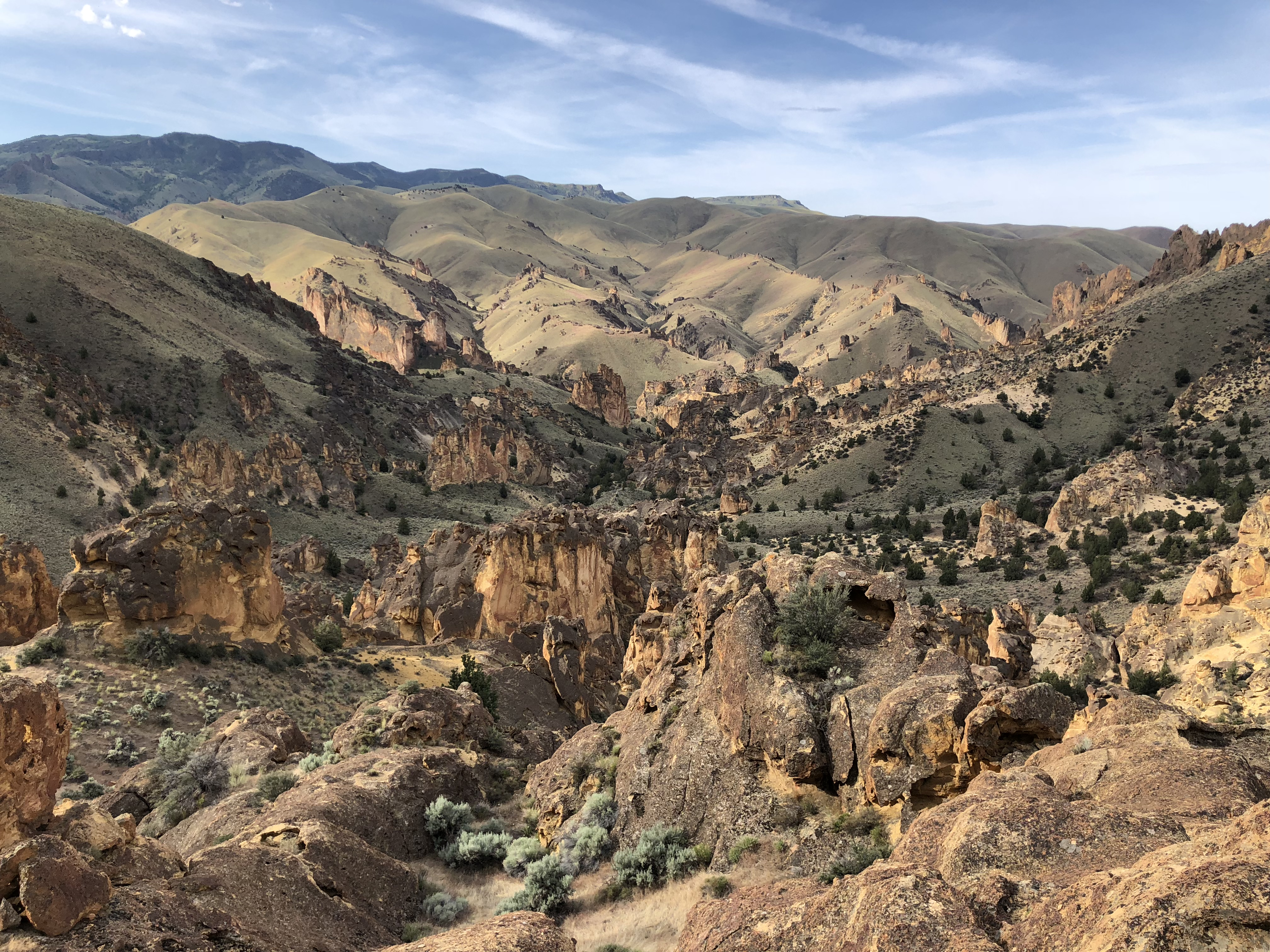
Juniper Gulch, located roughly five miles from Slocum Creek Campground in Leslie Gulch. June 2018.

Many of the sport climbing routes found in the area rely on artificially manufactured holds. The so-called "Einstein" and "Asylum" walls, in particular, are home to many routes composed almost entirely of human-drilled pockets. This activity was responsible for a moratorium on route development and BLM plans for bolt removal. However, the bolts have remained and the BLM has allowed climbing to continue.
