= New Bridge, Oregon =

Unincorporated community in the state of Oregon, United States

- Unincorporated community
- Location within Oregon Location within the United States
- Coordinates: 44°48′02″N 117°11′24″W
- Country: United States
- State: Oregon
- County: Baker
- Elevation: 2,369 ft (722 m)
- Time zone: UTC-8 (Pacific (PST))
  - Summer (DST): UTC-7 (PDT)
- Area codes: 458 and 541
- GNIS feature ID: 1146799

New Bridge (or Newbridge) is an unincorporated community in Baker County, Oregon, about three miles north of Richland and Oregon Route 86. Its elevation is 2,369 feet (722 m).

== History ==
New Bridge was founded on the banks of Eagle Creek near an important bridge built across the stream in pioneer times. Joseph Gale was the first postmaster of New Bridge post office, which ran from 1878 until 1967. The town was originally in Union County until 1901, when the boundaries were changed to eliminate the panhandle in which New Bridge was located. New Bridge was platted in 1908, "only after irreversible decline had set in". New Bridge sold agricultural products from the Eagle Valley to miners near Sparta. It had a fruit and vegetable cannery, a box factory, and a packing shed for apples. The decline of New Bridge was due in part to nearby Richland being platted in 1897.
