= Mentzelia packardiae =

Conservation status
- Imperiled (NatureServe)

Scientific classification
- Kingdom: Plantae
- Clade: Tracheophytes
- Clade: Angiosperms
- Clade: Eudicots
- Clade: Asterids
- Order: Cornales
- Family: Loasaceae
- Genus: Mentzelia
- Species: M. packardiae

Binomial name
- Mentzelia packardiae Glad

Species of flowering plant

Mentzelia packardiae is a species of flowering plant in the Loasaceae known by the common names Packard's blazingstar and Packard's stickleaf. It is native to the western United States, where it is known from a small area in Oregon and Nevada.

This annual herb produces erect white to pale green stems up to 40 centimeters tall. The basal leaves are linear and leaves higher on the stem are linear or lance-shaped. Flowers occur along the stem and at its tip. Each has five oval or round petals up to 1.5 centimeters long which are yellow, sometimes with a red spot at the base. The fruit is a capsule up to 3 centimeters long which contains 10 to 20 seeds.

This plant grows on dry, potassium-rich volcanic ash soils. The soils are green-tinged. Associated plants include Senecio ertterae, Trifolium owyheense, and Phacelia lutea.

Threats to this rare plant include mining, recreational activity, off-road vehicles, and road construction.
