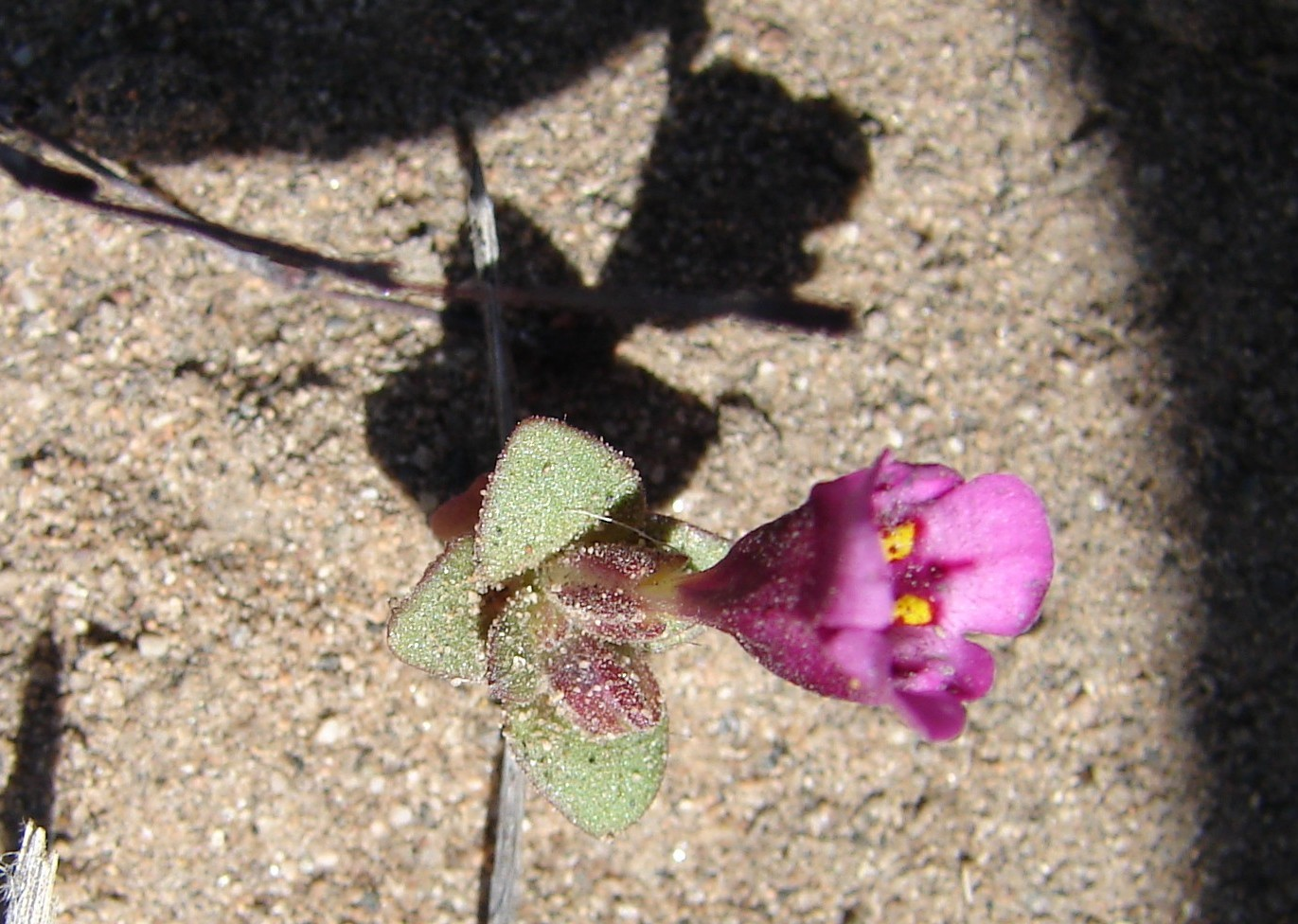

Conservation status
- Imperiled (NatureServe)

Scientific classification
- Kingdom: Plantae
- Clade: Embryophytes
- Clade: Tracheophytes
- Clade: Angiosperms
- Clade: Eudicots
- Clade: Asterids
- Order: Lamiales
- Family: Phrymaceae
- Genus: Diplacus
- Species: D. cusickii

Binomial name
- Diplacus cusickii (Greene) G.L.Nesom

Synonyms
- Eunanus cusickii Greene; Mimulus cusickii (Greene) Rattan

= Diplacus cusickii =

Species of flowering plant

Diplacus cusickii is a species of monkeyflower known by the common name Cusick's monkeyflower. It is native to the northwestern United States, where it can be found in parts of Idaho and Oregon. It grows in moist spots in bare and scrubby habitat, rocky slopes and plateau.

== Description ==
This is a hairy annual herb producing an erect stem up to about 24 centimeters tall. The pointed oval leaves are up to about 4.5 centimeters long, the herbage green to reddish in color. The tubular base of the flower corolla is encapsulated in a hairy calyx of sepals with unequal pointed lobes at its mouth. The corolla is 2 to 3 cm long and pink in color with yellow blotches in the throat.

== Taxonomy ==
The species was first described as Eunanus cusickii by Edward Lee Greene in 1887. In 1898 Volney Rattan placed the species in genus Mimulus as M. cusickii. In 2012 Guy L. Nesom placed the species in genus Diplacus as D. cusickii. Nesom circumscribed the species more narrowly than M. cusickii, with most specimens previously considered M. cusickii described by Nesom as Diplacus cusickioides.
