= Eagle Valley (Oregon) =

- Valley
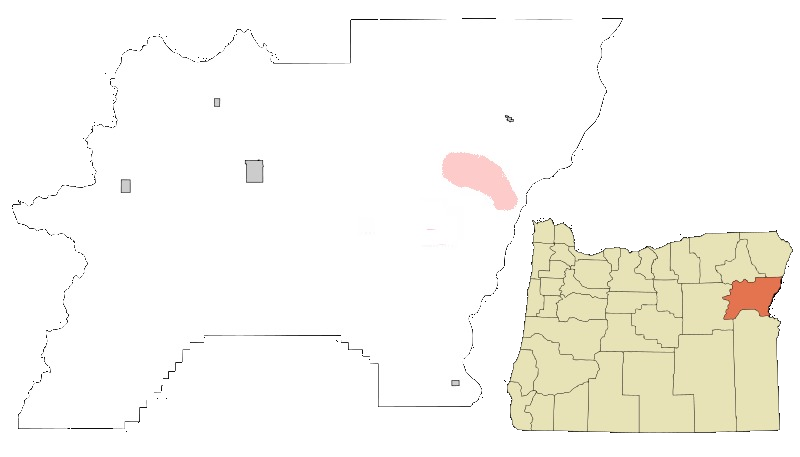
- Location of Eagle Valley in Baker County, Oregon.
- Coordinates: 44°43′30″N 117°08′12″W
- Country: United States
- Region: Eastern Oregon
- Principal communities: Richland; New Bridge; Sparta
- Area codes: 541 and 458

The Eagle Valley is a farming and timber-producing region in northeastern Oregon in the United States.

Located along the Snake River and its tributaries, the valley forms part of historic region of Baker County near the Idaho border. The largest community in the Eagle Valley is Richland. The unincorporated communities of New Bridge and Sparta are also located in the area of Eagle Valley.

The valley forms a relatively isolated enclave southeast of the Wallowa-Whitman National Forest. It is separated from the nearby Pine Valley. The valley is characterized by a mediterran climate that allows a long growing season for the farmers and ranchers in the area. The town of Richland is notable for its Eagle Valley Day Festival, named after the Eagle Valley. Oregon Route 86 crosses the valley from Baker City into Richland, then into Halfway.
