= Northwest Oregon =

Geographic and cultural region of the U.S. state of Oregon

Northwest Oregon

Northwest Oregon is a geographic and cultural region of the U.S. state of Oregon, composed of Clatsop, Columbia, and Tillamook counties. The region encompasses the northernmost parts of the state along the lower Columbia River.

== History ==
The region was inhabited for thousands of years by the Chinook and Coast Salish peoples.

In May 1792, American explorer Robert Gray became the first European American to navigate the Columbia River, trading with the native tribes and exploring up to 15 miles upriver. Gray created a chart of the lower river, a copy of which was acquired by British explorer George Vancouver. Vancouver conducted a more thorough expedition of the river, traveling as far up as Mount Hood.

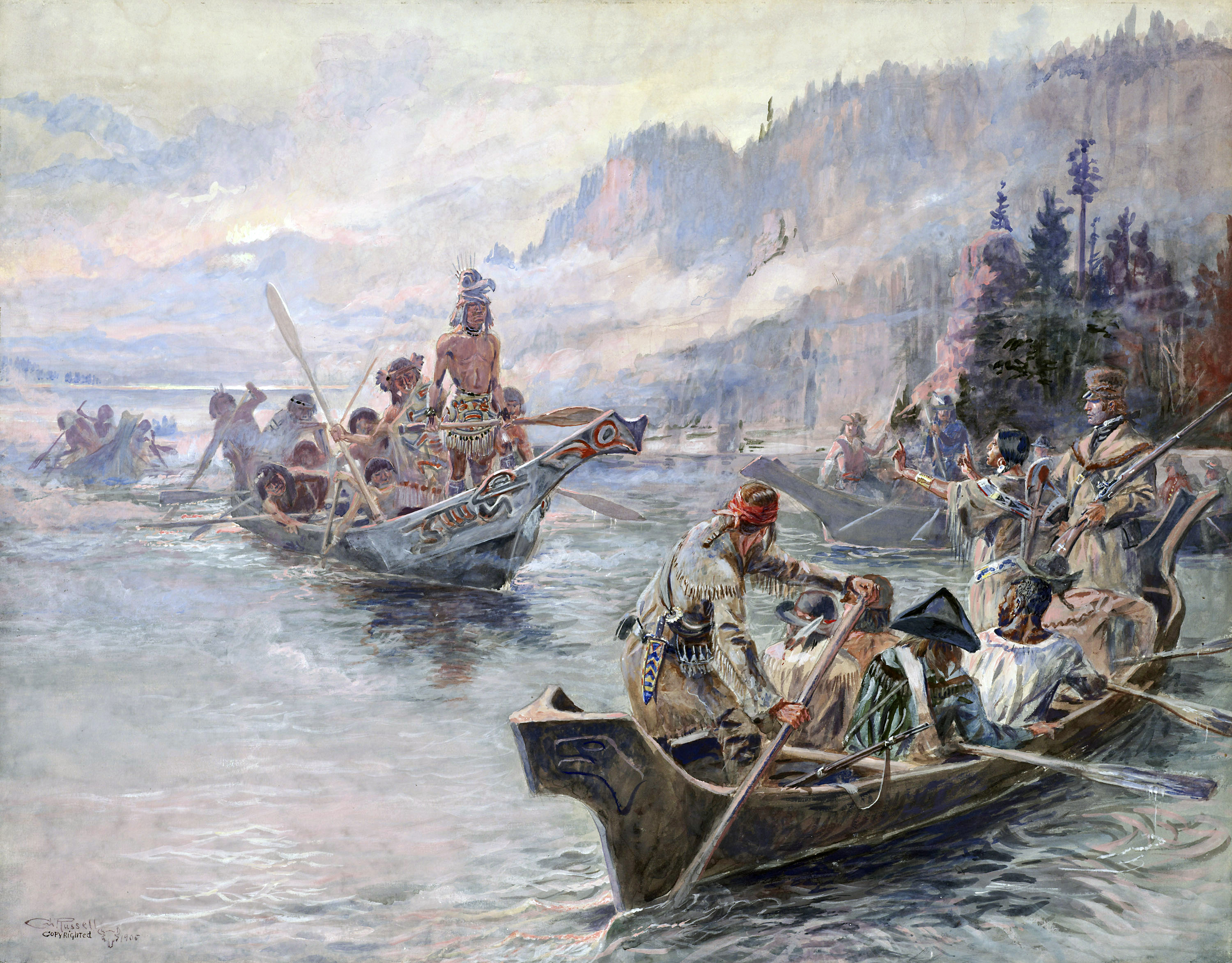
Painting of the Lewis and Clark expedition meeting the Chinooks in 1805

The Lewis and Clark Expedition, led by Meriwether Lewis and William Clark, sighted the Pacific Ocean for the first time on November 7, 1805, arriving two weeks later. The expedition faced its second bitter winter camped on the north side of the Columbia River, in a storm-wracked area. Lack of food was a major factor. The elk, the party's main source of food, had retreated from their usual haunts into the mountains, and the party was now too poor to purchase enough food from neighboring tribes. On November 24, 1805, the party voted to move their camp to the south side of the Columbia River near modern Astoria, Oregon. Sacagawea, and Clark's slave York, were both allowed to participate in the vote, so this may have been the first time in American history where a woman and a slave were allowed to vote in an election run by European immigrants. Indigenous people had included women previously.

On the south side of the Columbia River, 2 miles (3 km) upstream on the west side of the Netul River (now Lewis and Clark River), they constructed Fort Clatsop. They did this not just for shelter and protection, but also to officially establish the American presence there, with the American flag flying over the fort. During the winter at Fort Clatsop, Lewis committed himself to writing. He filled many pages of his journals with valuable knowledge, mostly about botany, because of the abundant growth and forests that covered that part of the continent. The health of the men also became a problem, with many suffering from colds and influenza.

In 1811, British explorer David Thompson, the first person known to have navigated the entire length of the Columbia River, reached the partially constructed Fort Astoria near the mouth of the river. He arrived just two months after the Pacific Fur Company's ship, the Tonquin. The fort constructed by the Tonquin party established Astoria as a U.S., rather than a British, settlement. It became a vital post for American exploration of the continent and was later used as an American claim in the Oregon boundary dispute with European nations. Astoria is the oldest permanently inhabited settlement established by Americans on the Pacific coast.

In 1848, the area became part of the Oregon Territory, and became part of the state of Oregon following Oregon's admission to the Union in 1859.

== Geography ==
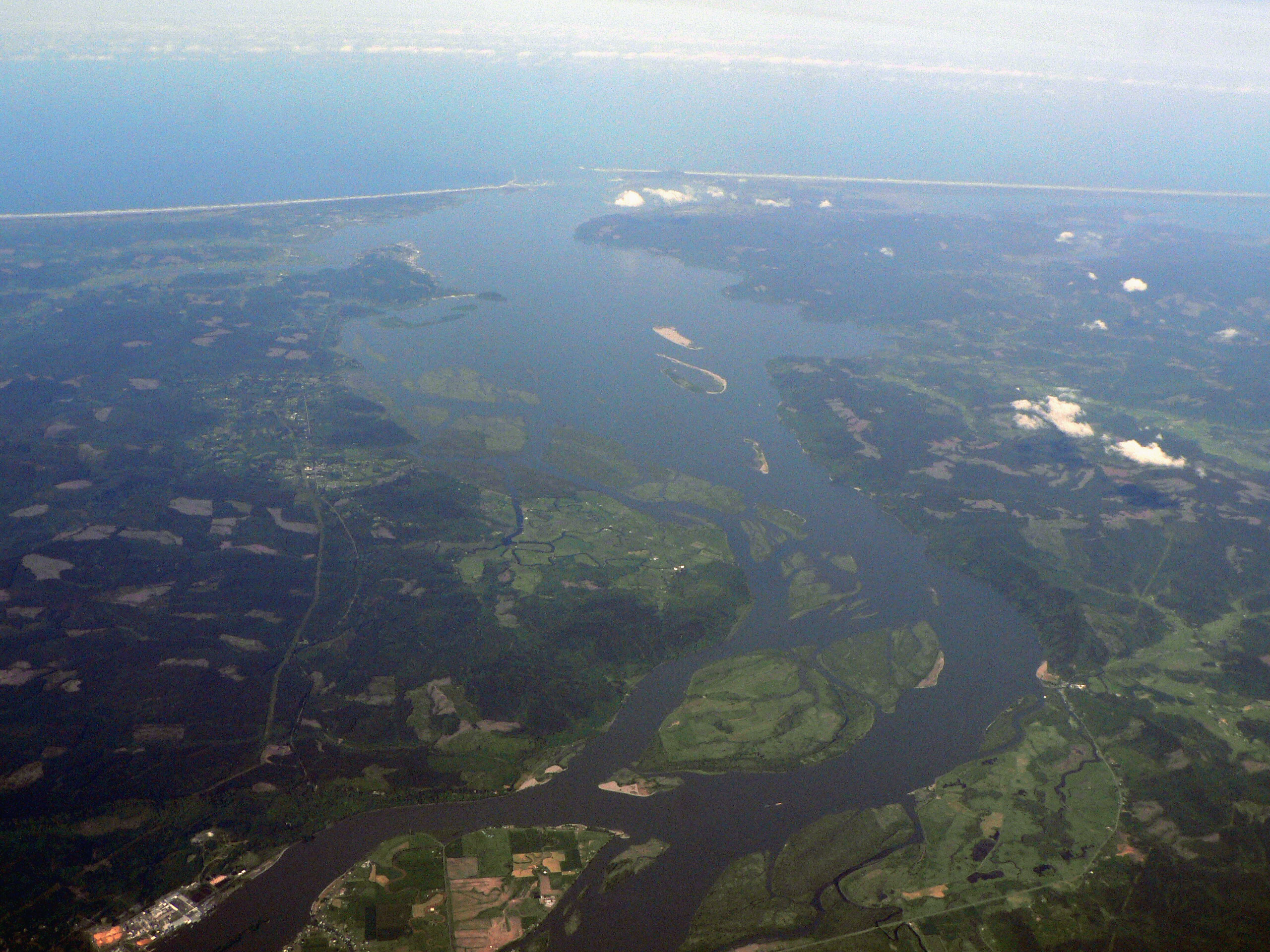
The Columbia River Estuary

Northwest Oregon is bounded on the north and much of the east by the Columbia River which separates it from the state of Washington, on the west by the Pacific Ocean, and on the southeast by the rest of Oregon. The Willamette meridian marks the southeast corner. Saddle Mountain, at an elevation of 3,288 feet, is the highest mountain in the region. It is part of the Oregon Coast Range, which takes up most of the interior of the region.

=== Counties ===
Generally, the following three counties are considered to be part of Northwest Oregon. Sometimes, parts of Washington County are included as well.

- Clatsop County (population 37,831)
- Columbia County (population 49,600)
- Tillamook County (population 25,653)

The total population of the region is 113,084.

=== Cities ===
City	County	Population (2015)
St. Helens	Columbia	13,158
Astoria	Clatsop	9,626
Scappoose	Columbia	6,954
Seaside	Clatsop	6,540
Warrenton	Clatsop	5,282
Tillamook	Tillamook	4,997
Vernonia	Columbia	2,143
Columbia City	Columbia	1,958
Rainier	Columbia	1,920
Clatskanie	Columbia	1,759
Cannon Beach	Clatsop	1,702
Gearhart	Clatsop	1,524
Rockaway Beach	Tillamook	1,347
Bay City	Tillamook	1,332
Garibaldi	Tillamook	783
Manzanita	Tillamook	622
Wheeler	Tillamook	419
Nehalem	Tillamook	278
Prescott	Columbia	49

== Politics ==
Presidential election results
Year	Democratic	Republican	Others
2024	46.8% 33,175	49.6% 35,111	3.6% 2,590
2020	47.7% 34,817	48.9% 35,722	3.4% 2,480
2016	41.9% 25,187	46.4% 27,893	11.7% 7,005
2012	51.9% 28,158	43.7% 23,705	4.3% 2,349
2008	55.0% 31,163	41.3% 23,362	3.7% 2,088
2004	51.2% 29,774	47.1% 27,374	1.8% 1,029
2000	48.7% 24,389	44.1% 22,094	7.1% 3,562
1996	50.4% 22,782	34.1% 15,423	15.5% 7,008
1992	44.1% 21,038	27.8% 13,269	28.1% 13,391
1988	56.2% 22,586	41.5% 16,677	2.3% 929
1984	50.0% 20,732	49.6% 20,600	0.4% 166
1980	44.9% 18,127	41.8% 16,870	13.3% 5,370
1976	52.7% 19,151	42.5% 15,437	4.8% 1,754
1972	47.1% 15,558	46.9% 15,466	5.9% 1,951
1968	51.2% 15,916	42.7% 13,279	6.1% 1,881
1964	70.6% 21,345	29.1% 8,830	0.2% 79
1960	52.5% 16,174	47.3% 14,577	0.2% 67

Politically, Northwest Oregon is divided. Clatsop County leans Democratic, having not voted for a Republican in a presidential election since 1956. Columbia County is traditionally Democratic, although in 2016 it voted for a Republican (Donald Trump) for the first time since 1928. Tillamook County is more of a swing county, voting Democratic 15 times and Republican seven times since 1932. Since 1920 it has also acted as somewhat of a bellwether, voting for the national winner all but three times since then.

Northwest Oregon is represented congressionally by Representatives Suzanne Bonamici (Clatsop and Columbia) and Kurt Schrader (Tillamook), both Democrats. Most of the region is represented in the Oregon State Senate by Betsy Johnson, a Democrat; it is represented in the Oregon House of Representatives by Brad Witt and Deborah Boone, also Democrats. Southern Tillamook County is served by Senator Arnie Roblan and Representative David Gomberg, also Democrats.

== See also ==
- List of regions of Oregon
- Northwest Oregon Conference
- Oregon Coast
- Western Oregon
