= Diplacus cusickioides =

Conservation status
- Apparently Secure (NatureServe)

Scientific classification
- Kingdom: Plantae
- Clade: Embryophytes
- Clade: Tracheophytes
- Clade: Angiosperms
- Clade: Eudicots
- Clade: Asterids
- Order: Lamiales
- Family: Phrymaceae
- Genus: Diplacus
- Species: D. cusickioides

Binomial name
- Diplacus cusickioides G.L.Nesom

Species of flowering plant

Diplacus cusickioides is a species of flowering plant in the family Phrymaceae. It is an annual native to Idaho, Oregon, Washington, and northeastern California in the northwestern United States. In California it is known only from the Warner Mountains, where the plant grows on canyon slopes and scree from 600 to 1600 meters elevation.

The species was described by Guy L. Nesom in 2013, and includes many plants previously described as Mimulus cusickii (now Diplacus cusickii). Nesom circumscribed D. cusickii more narrowly to include populations in Idaho and Oregon.
