= Senecio ertterae =

Conservation status
- Imperiled (NatureServe)

Scientific classification
- Kingdom: Plantae
- Clade: Tracheophytes
- Clade: Angiosperms
- Clade: Eudicots
- Clade: Asterids
- Order: Asterales
- Family: Asteraceae
- Genus: Senecio
- Species: S. ertterae

Binomial name
- Senecio ertterae T.M.Barkley

Species of flowering plant

Senecio ertterae is a species of flowering plant in the aster family known by the common name Ertter's ragwort. It is endemic to Oregon, United States.

This annual herb grows 20 to 50 centimeters tall, sometimes reaching 60 centimeters or more. The leaves and stems are slightly succulent. The lance-shaped or spatula-shaped leaves are borne on winged petioles. The inflorescence is a cyme-shaped array of several flower heads. The yellow ray florets are each about half a centimeter long. Flowering occurs in July through October.

This species occurs in the Leslie Gulch in eastern Oregon, in Malheur County. It is limited to soils of rhyolite and tuff. The terrain is subject to disturbance, such as flooding and erosion. Other plants in the sparsely vegetated habitat include Pseudoroegneria spicata (bluebunch wheatgrass), Bromus tectorum (cheatgrass), Mimulus cusickii (Cusick's monkeyflower), Eriogonum vimineum (broom buckwheat), and Phacelia hastata (silverleaf phacelia).

An annual species, this plant may be much more prevalent in years with sufficient rainfall. At times it is locally abundant.
