= Malheur Butte =

Mountain in Oregon, United States

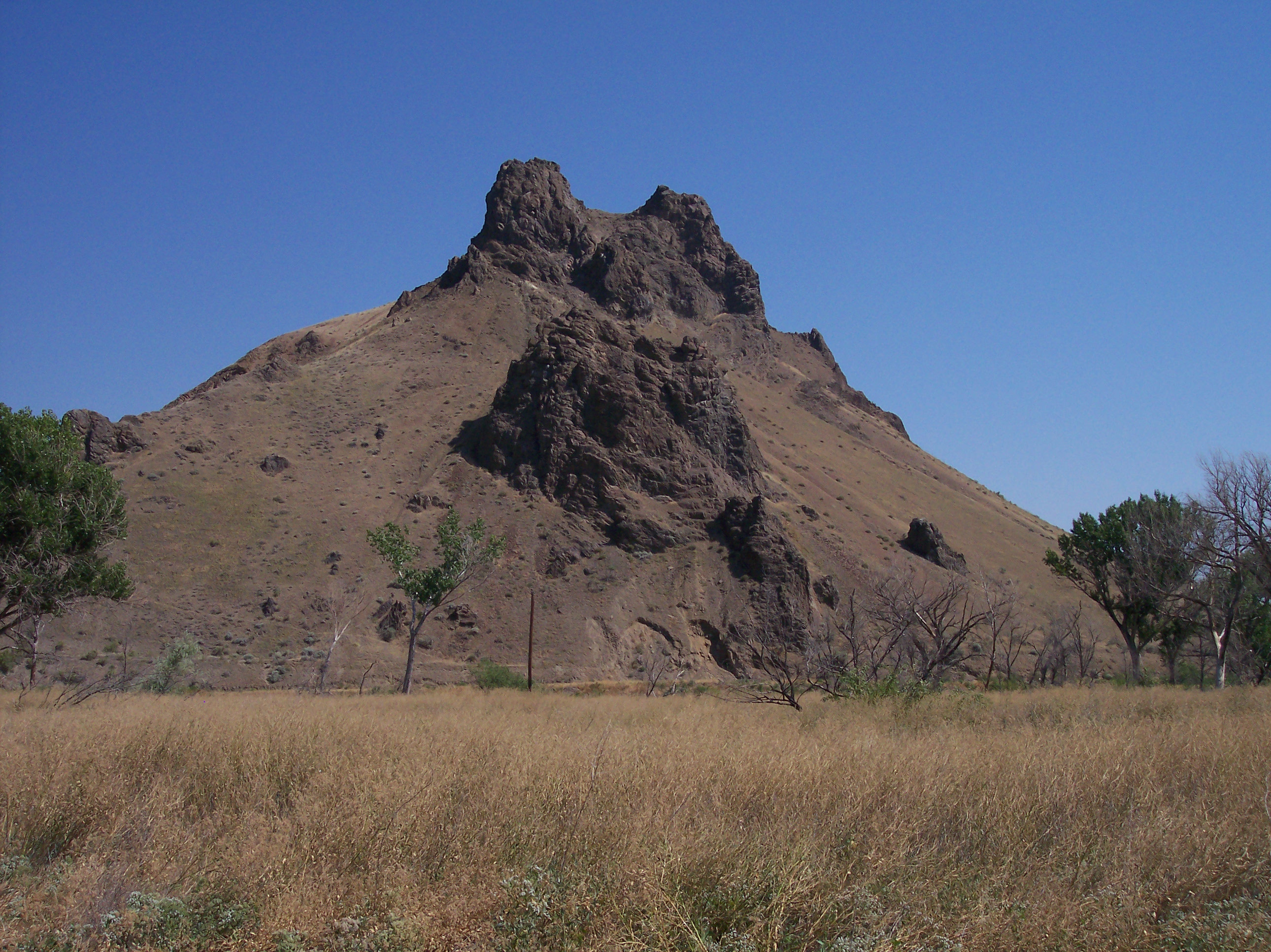

Highest point
- Elevation: 2,661 ft (811 m) NGVD 29
- Prominence: 500 ft (150 m)
- Coordinates: 44°00′40″N 117°05′07″W

Geography
- Location within Oregon
- Location: Malheur County, Oregon, U.S.
- Topo map: USGS Malheur Butte

Malheur Butte is an extinct volcano located in Malheur County, Oregon. Between 20 and 15 million years ago, the region from north-central Washington to northeastern California experienced a series of volcanic eruptions and basalt lava floods that covered thousands of square miles. These ancient lava floods often dammed streams, creating lakes and swamps that may have lasted for millions of years before filling with sediment or draining as erosion slowly lowered their outlets. The western Snake River plain contained many such lakes, and geologists believe that between 8 and 2 million years ago, "Lake Idaho" covered much of central eastern Oregon. Sediment deposited in this lake once covered Malheur Butte, and during the last 2 million years the Malheur River and other eroding forces slowly exposed and shaped today's landmark.

Although Malheur Butte has been inactive for millions of years, Malheur County is still alive with geothermal activity in the form of hot springs. The rock is slightly over 100 meters higher than the surrounding plains and the peak is 790 meters above sea level.

== Etymology ==
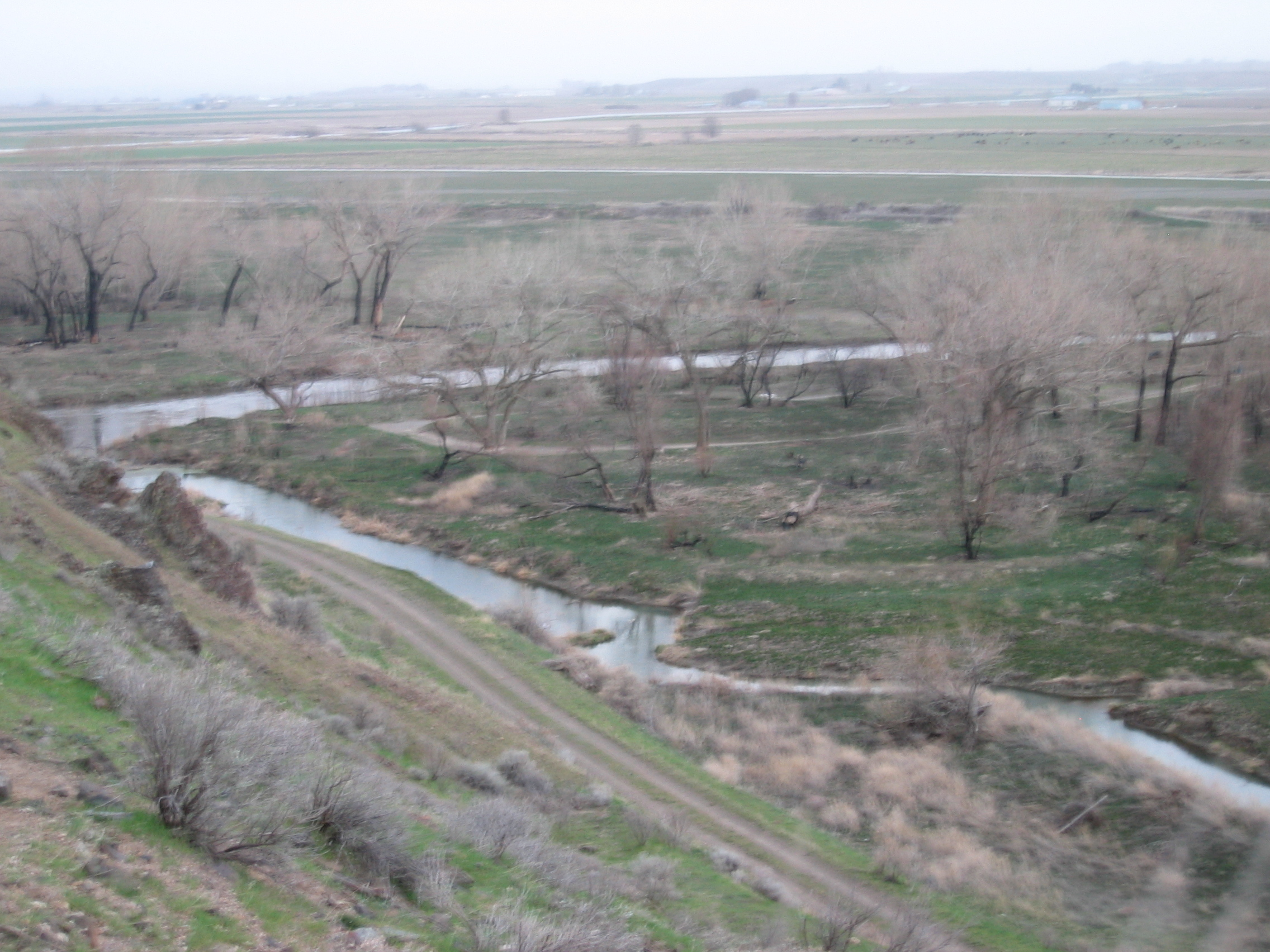
Creek surrounding the butte, Ontario Municipal Airport in the background

Malheur (pronounced phonetically by residents) is French for "misfortune," "bad fortune," or "unhappiness," most likely taken from the Malheur River that flows nearby. Peter Skene Ogden, a trader accompanied by French-Canadian hunters, explained in his journal in 1826 that the Malheur River was so named because property and furs that had been hidden in the vicinity had been discovered and stolen by natives.

== Legends ==
The Malheur Butte has multiple legends surrounding it. Locals believe there are witches who live in the Butte. There have been many claims of dogs with red eyes or no eyes at all. And shadowy figures have been spotted several times around the area. The figures are believed to be the witches' curses to protect the land for when they return.
