= Eastern Oregon =

Geographic and cultural region of the U.S. state of Oregon

Coordinates: 44.182204°N 118.652344°W

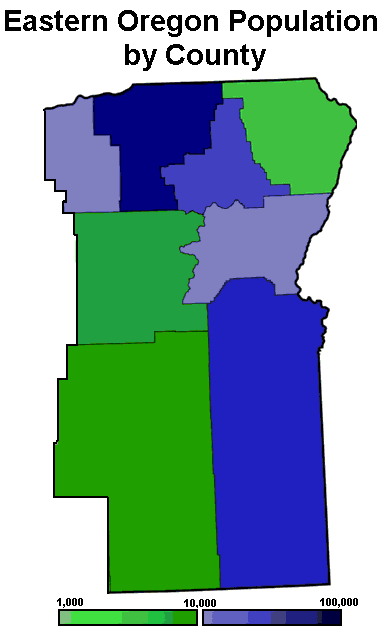
Eastern Oregon population according to the eight-county definition

Eastern Oregon is a region of the U.S. state of Oregon. It is not an officially recognized geographic entity; thus, the boundaries of the region vary according to context. It is sometimes understood to include only the eight easternmost counties in the state; in other contexts, it includes the entire area east of the Cascade Range. Cities in the basic eight-county definition include Baker City, Burns, Hermiston, Pendleton, Boardman, John Day, La Grande, and Ontario. Umatilla County is home to the largest population base in Eastern Oregon, accounting for 42% of the region's residents — more than twice that of the region’s second most populous, Malheur County. Hermiston, located in Umatilla County, is the largest city in the region, accounting for 10% of the population. Major industries include transportation/warehousing, timber, agriculture and tourism. The main transportation corridors are I-84, U.S. Route 395, U.S. Route 97, U.S. Route 26, U.S. Route 30, and U.S. Route 20.

Compared to that of the western part of the state, the climate of Eastern Oregon has a drier continental climate, with much greater seasonal variations in temperature. Unlike the Willamette Valley, Eastern Oregon receives a significant amount of snow in the winter. Some areas receive fewer than 10 inches (250 mm) of rain yearly, classifying them as deserts. This desert climate is in part due to a rain shadow effect caused by the Cascade Range. Pine and juniper forests cover 35% of Eastern Oregon, much in the mountains that include the Blue Mountains, Strawberry Mountains, Wallowa Mountains, Trout Creek Mountains, Ochoco Mountains, and Steens Mountain. Volcanic basalt flows from the Columbia River Basalt Group covered large sections of Eastern Oregon 6 to 17 million years ago. Other landforms include the Alvord Desert, Owyhee Desert, Warner Valley, Deschutes River, Owyhee River, Grande Ronde River, Joseph Canyon, The Honeycombs, and Malheur Butte.

== Geography ==
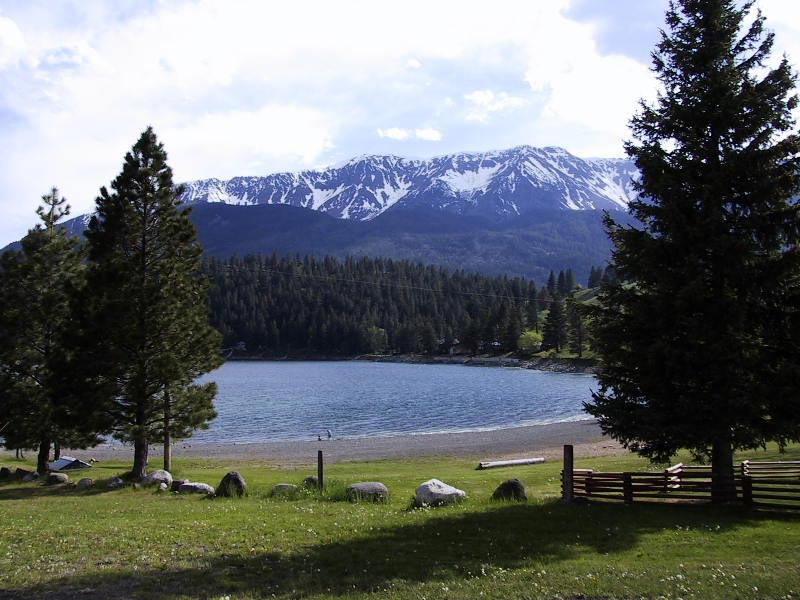
Mountains and glacial lake in Wallowa County attract tourists to the area.

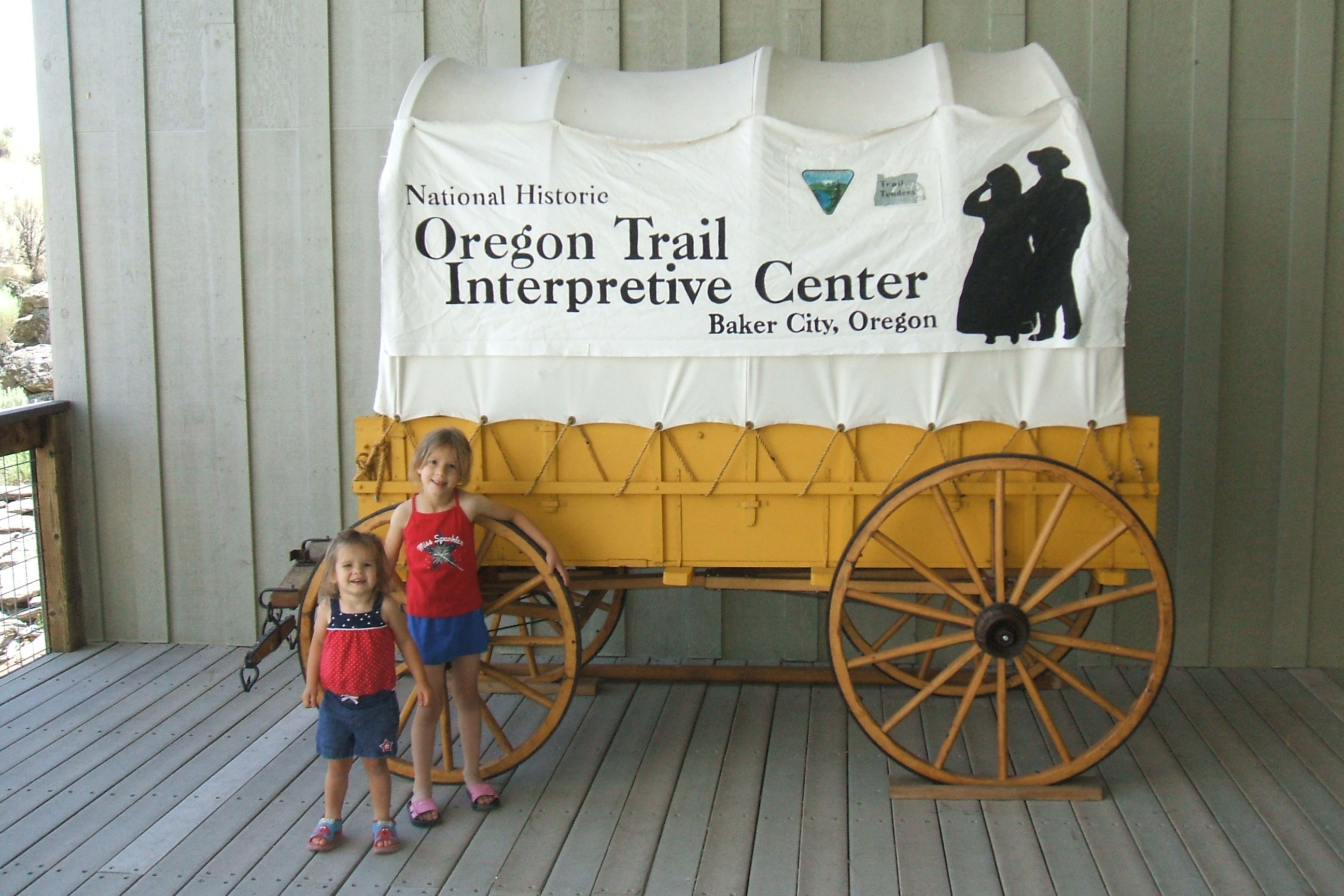
Baker City is home to the National Historic Oregon Trail Interpretive Center.

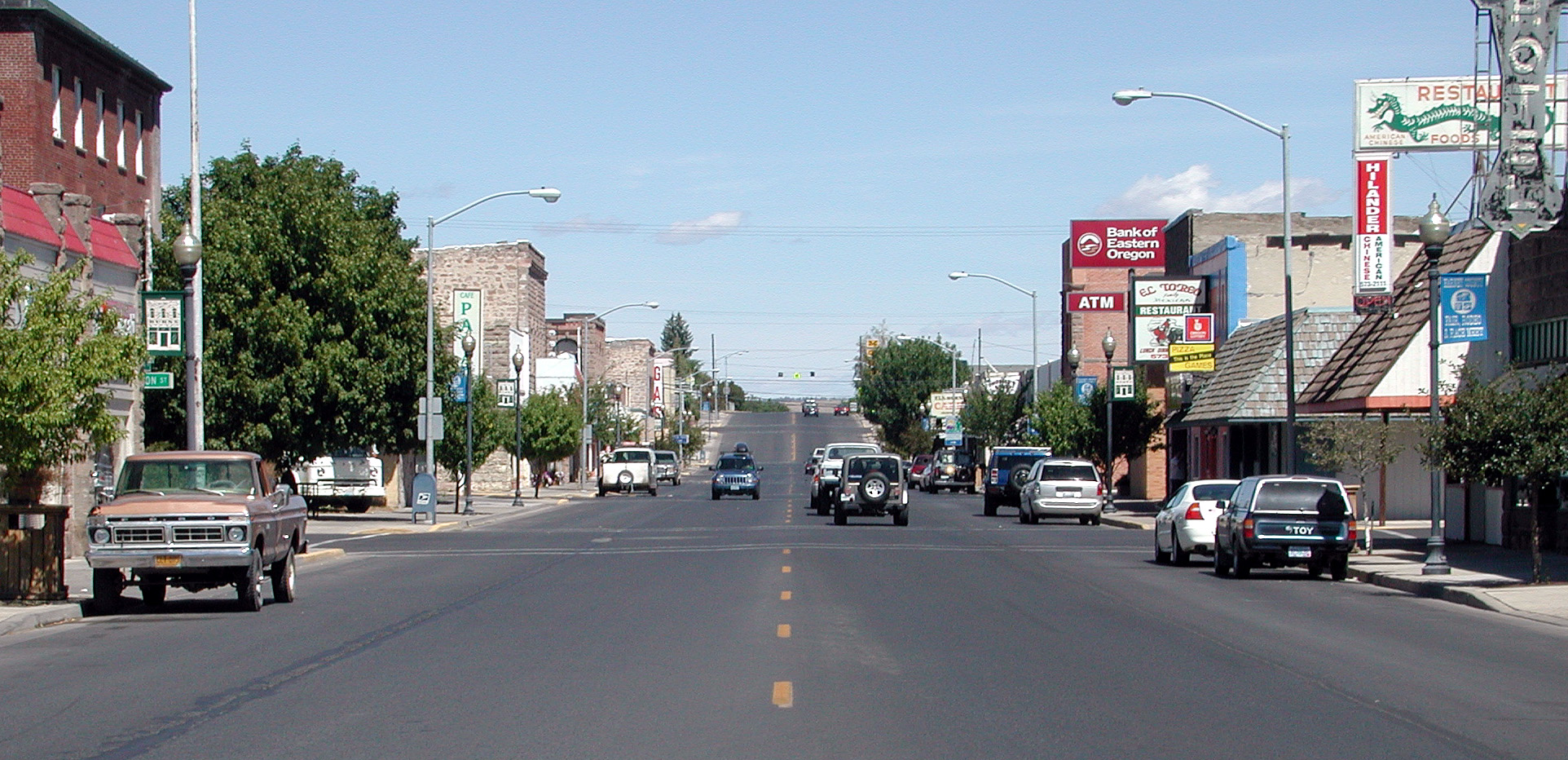
Downtown Burns

According to the Eastern Oregon Visitors Association, Eastern Oregon includes only the following eight counties: Morrow, Umatilla, Union, Wallowa, Grant, Baker, Harney, and Malheur. The association divides the eight-county definition into three subregions: the Columbia River Plateau (Morrow and Umatilla counties); northeast Oregon (Baker, Union, and Wallowa counties); and southeast Oregon (Grant, Harney, and Malheur counties). Some definitions of the region are more restrictive, while others include the base eight counties listed above plus several adjacent counties. Still others include the entire area east of the Cascade Range; this meaning would also include Sherman, Crook, Deschutes, Gilliam, Jefferson, Klamath, Lake, Wasco, and Wheeler counties.^{a}

The extreme eastern section of Oregon in the Snake River Valley, including the city of Ontario, is part of the Treasure Valley, which extends east to Boise, Idaho. Unlike the rest of the state, that section lies within the Mountain Time Zone. Sacajawea Peak is the region's highest mountain.

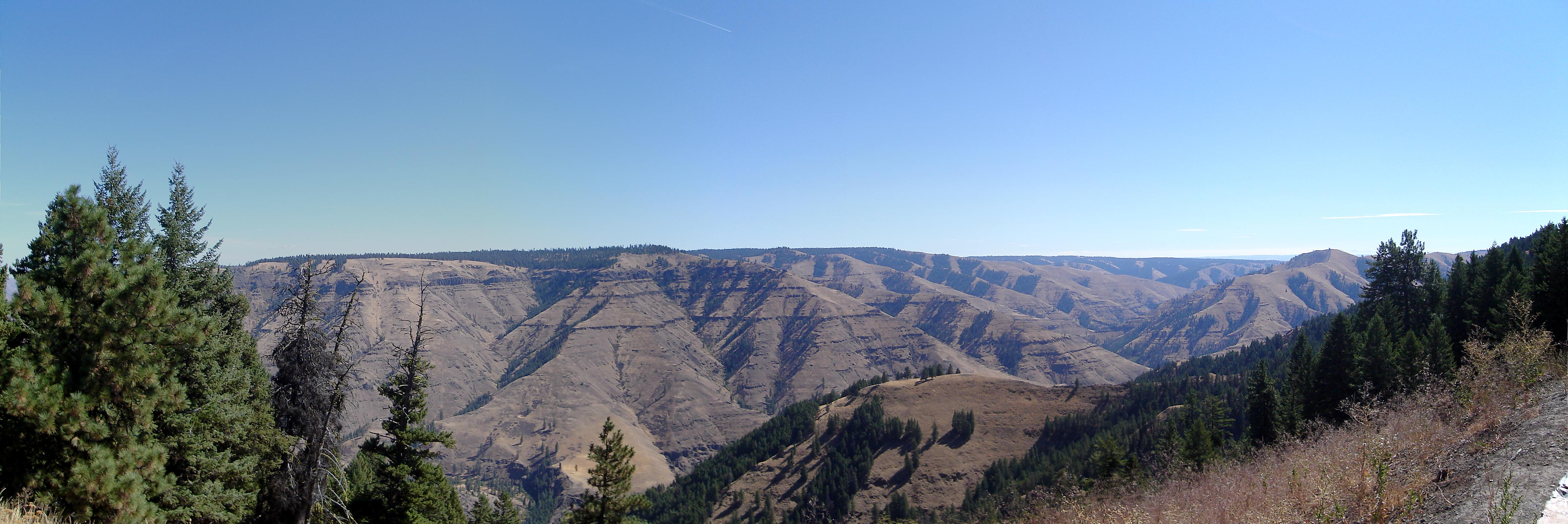
Joseph Canyon

== Politics ==
Although Oregon as a whole is generally considered a blue state, Eastern Oregon is far more conservative than the west. In 2024, Donald Trump easily received over 60% of the vote in every Eastern Oregon county.

The political divide between the eastern and western parts of the state has led some residents of Eastern Oregon to claim that the state of Oregon, with the majority of its population and political control based in the west of the Cascade Range, has neglected the eastern part of the state, preventing it from developing along with the western part. A movement to have Eastern Oregon secede and join the United States as a 51st state was underway in 2008.

=== Greater Idaho ===
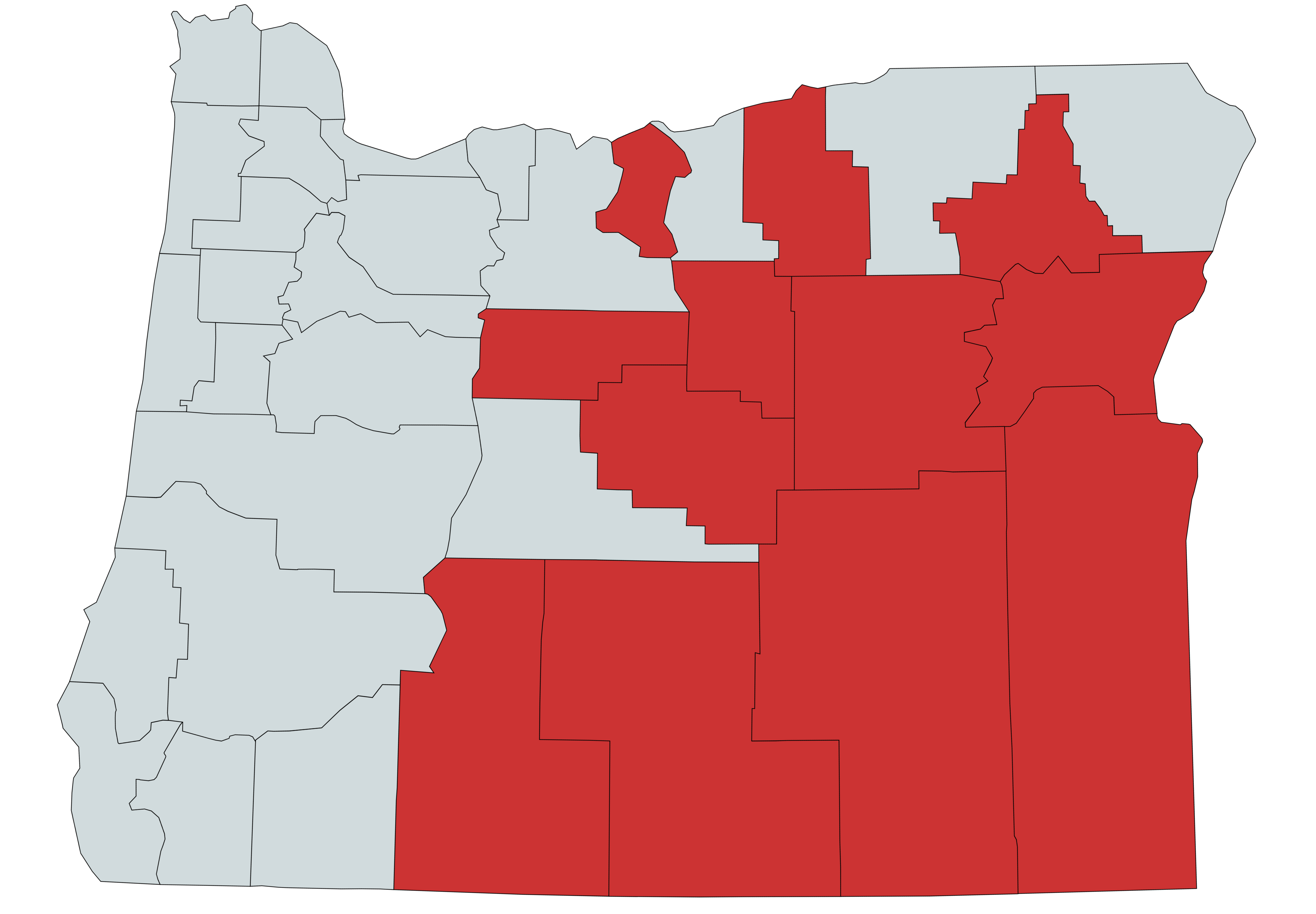
As of May 2026, twelve counties in Oregon (shown in red) had approved ballot measures in favor of Greater Idaho.

In 2021, five counties in Eastern Oregon voted to direct their County Commissioners to hold annual hearings on the issue of joining Idaho, the state located east of Oregon. It was initiated by the group "Move Oregon's Border for a Greater Idaho", who support the Greater Idaho movement. As of May 2022, eight counties had voted to direct their County Commissioners to examine the issue further. Some counties, such as Douglas and Josephine, had voted against joining the coalition. By November, three more counties in Eastern Oregon, for a total of eleven, had voted to join Idaho, a number that grew to 12 by June of 2023.

On January 10, 2023, Senate Joint Memorial 2, also known as the Greater Idaho Bill, was sponsored in the Oregon Senate by politician Dennis Linthicum.

== Cities ==
Top 15 most populated Eastern Oregon cities (according to the 8-county definition):

Rank	City	Population (2023)	County
1	Hermiston	20,322	Umatilla
2	Pendleton	17,006	Umatilla
3	La Grande	12,823	Union
4	Ontario	12,206	Malheur
5	Baker City	10,102	Baker
6	Umatilla	7,810	Umatilla
7	Milton-Freewater	7,490	Umatilla
8	Boardman	4,437	Morrow
9	Nyssa	3,363	Malheur
10	Burns	2,730	Harney
11	Stanfield	2,313	Umatilla
12	Union	2,182	Union
13	Enterprise	2,147	Wallowa
14	Irrigon	2,133	Morrow
15	Vale	1,947	Malheur

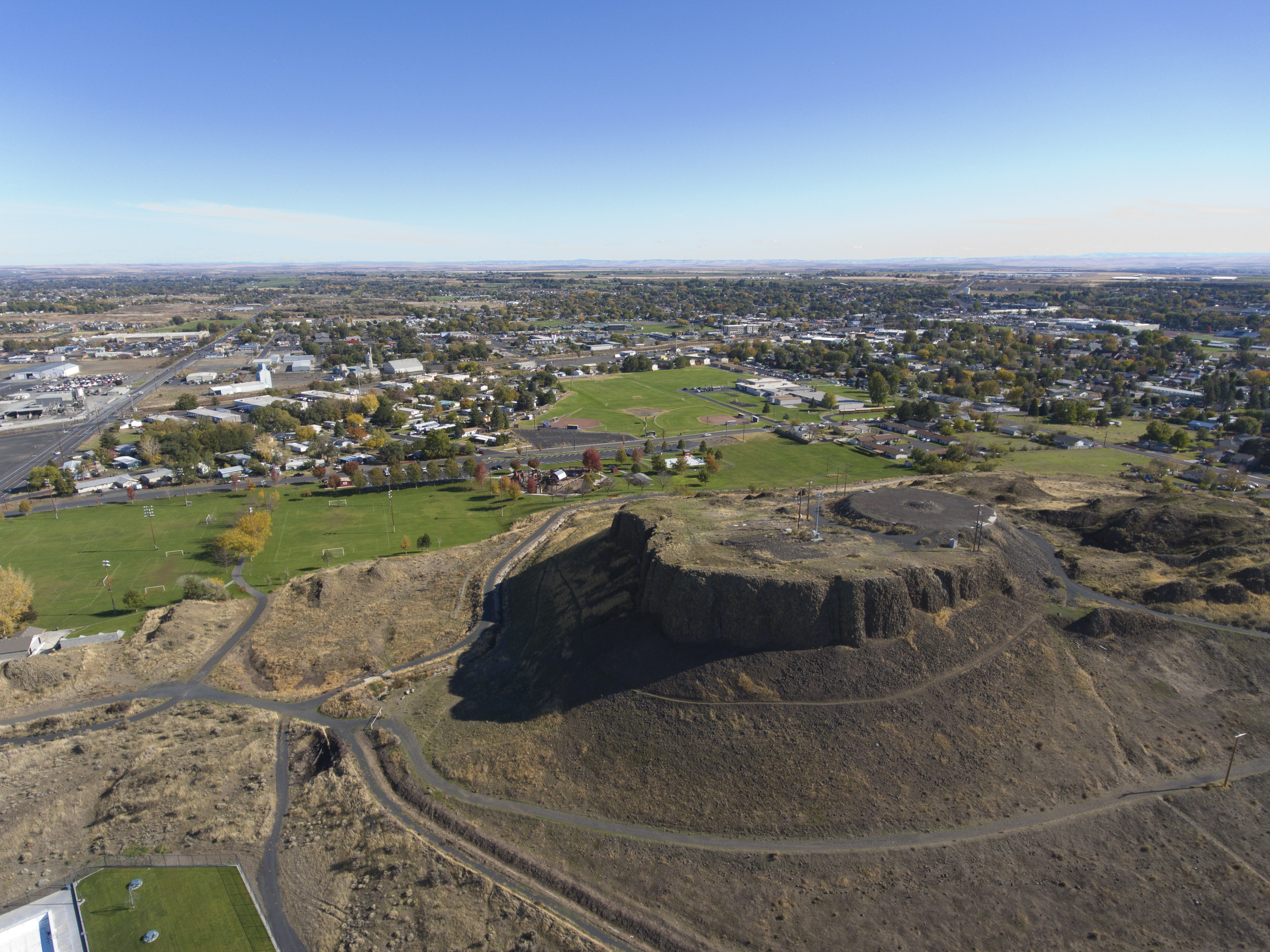
The Hermiston Butte, in the middle of Hermiston, features hiking trails and access to the adjacent Hermiston Aquatics Center.

By extending the boundary outside to include neighboring counties, Eastern Oregon would include three of the largest population centers east of the Cascade Range: Bend, Redmond, and Klamath Falls. However, these lie outside the stricter boundary.

== Climate and ecology ==
Compared to the maritime rainforest climate of Western Oregon, which is adjacent to the Pacific Ocean, the climate of Eastern Oregon is a drier continental climate, with much greater seasonal variations in temperature. Unlike the Willamette Valley, Eastern Oregon gets a significant amount of snow in the winter. Some parts of Eastern Oregon receive fewer than 10 inches (250 mm) of rain yearly, classifying them as deserts. The driest parts are the southeast and the area near Redmond. This desert climate is in part due to a rain shadow effect caused by the Cascade Range. Pine and juniper forests cover 35% of Eastern Oregon, especially in the mountains east of Klamath Falls and in the Blue Mountains.

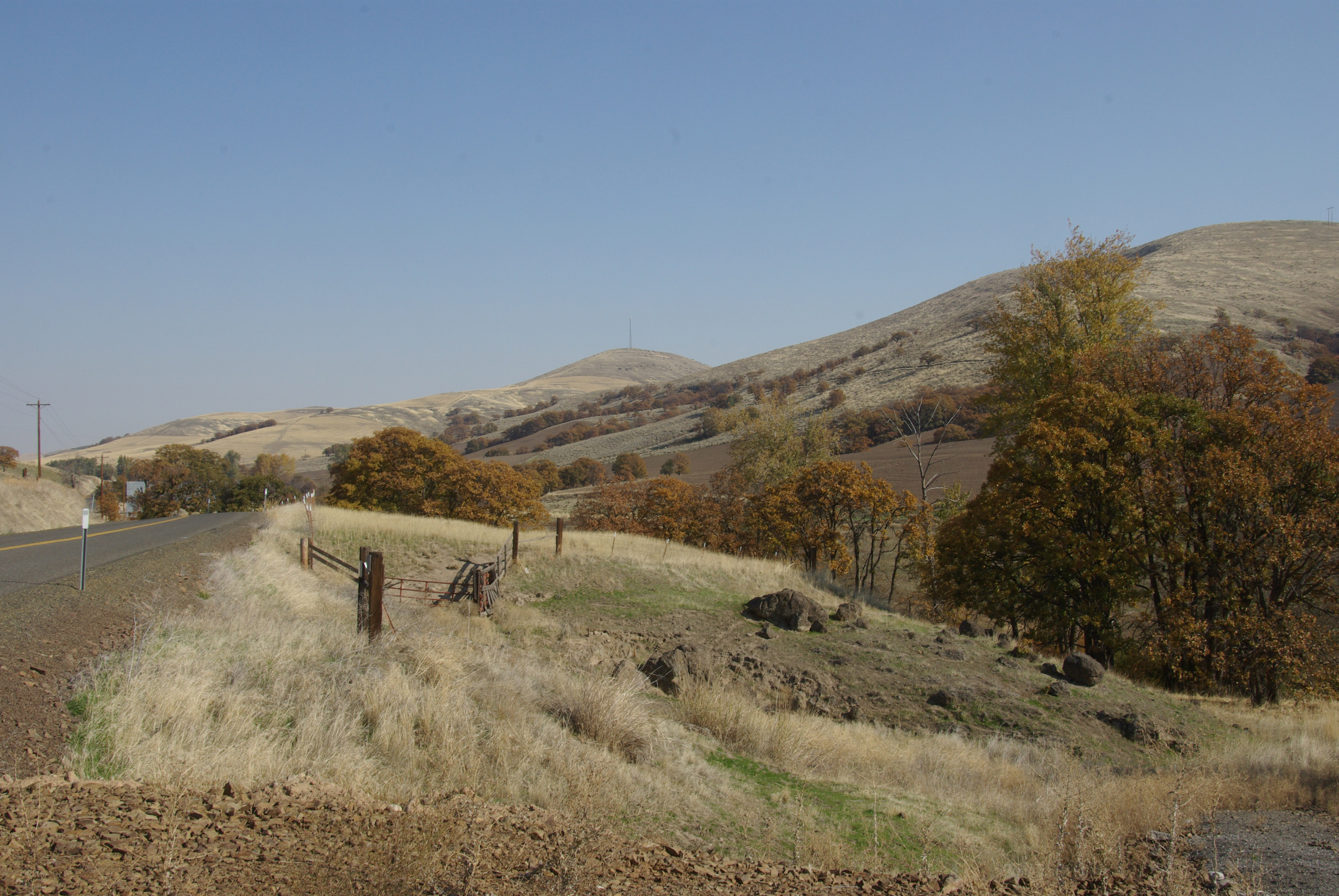
Freshly tilled wheat fields on western edge of wheat growing area in central Wasco County

== Economy ==
The region's economy is primarily agricultural. Timber and mining, while formerly key industries, have decreased in importance in recent years. Cultural tourism, agritourism and ecotourism continue to develop. The wheat growing region of Eastern Oregon includes the Columbia Plateau portion of northeastern Oregon, which begins with very marginal wheat fields in central Wasco County and extends east through Umatilla County. Its rich loess soils "help make the Columbia Plateau one of the premier wheat-producing regions in the world." South of the wheat lands of northeast Oregon, agricultural activity is generally limited to livestock grazing except where irrigation is available. Irrigated areas are often used to produce alfalfa hay.

== Recreation ==
From the high desert to the rugged mountainous areas of the Eagle Cap Wilderness area, Eastern Oregon has a range of outdoor recreational opportunities such as skiing, rafting, and hiking.

Anthony Lakes is the largest ski resort in Eastern Oregon. Spout Springs, located in the Umatilla National Forest in the Blue Mountains, is popular with families. Rafting is often seasonal on the rivers that are snowpack-dependent and not dammed. The Owyhee River is an example of a desert canyon river experience. The Snake River offers boating experiences that range from a quiet drift through the desert to hair-raising thrills of class II to III+ rapids.

== Transportation ==
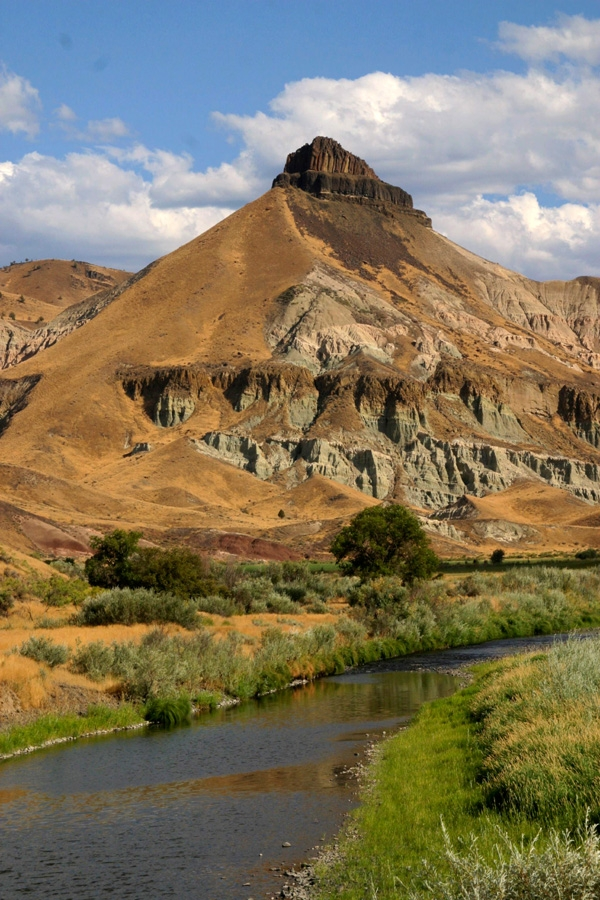
The John Day River passing by Sheep Rock in the John Day Fossil Beds National Monument

Historically, the region has been relatively isolated from Western Oregon, due to the difficulty of crossing the Cascades. Early settlers floated down the Columbia River from The Dalles to reach Western Oregon. In 1845, Sam Barlow built a road around the south side of Mount Hood, which served as the final leg of the Oregon Trail. The Applegate Trail and Santiam Wagon Road were constructed soon after, connecting eastern and western Oregon in the southern and central parts of the state. In the early 20th century, Samuel Hill built the Columbia River Highway, allowing automobiles to pass through the Columbia River Gorge.

Railroads began to be important as early as 1858 with the construction of the Oregon Portage Railroad which built a 4.5-mile (7.2 km) bypass around the rapids at Cascade Locks. This was followed by the 1862 incorporation of the Oregon Steam Navigation Company whose operations included building a rail bypass from The Dalles to Celilo Falls. In 1880 these two short sections of rail were incorporated into the Oregon Railway and Navigation Company (OR&N). Shortly thereafter Henry Villard, who then controlled OR&N, moved aggressively to block entry of the then under construction Northern Pacific Railway into the Columbia Gorge. In an agreement first made in March 1880 and formalized in the fall of 1880, the Northern Pacific Railway, then controlled by Frederick Billings, and the OR&N, at that time controlled by Henry Villard, agreed to divide the Columbia Plateau at the Snake River, with the Northern Pacific staying to the north and the OR&N staying to the south. Northern Pacific was not to build down the gorge into Portland, but would receive trackage rights on the tracks that OR&N was building on the south bank into Portland. The first St. Paul-Portland Northern Pacific train arrived in Portland on September 12, 1883, via OR&N trackage down the Oregon side of the Columbia River from Wallula, Washington forever ending the isolation of at least the northern portion of Eastern Oregon. A year later in November 1884, the Oregon Short Line was completed across southern Idaho and met the OR&N at Huntington, providing rail service that essentially paralleled the Oregon Trail all the way from Omaha, Nebraska. Later the OR&N became part of the Union Pacific Railway.

The only other railroad ever built east over the Cascade Mountains was trackage that was to become part of the Southern Pacific Transportation Company, which was opened in 1926 over Willamette Pass to Klamath Falls to bypass the difficult line south of Eugene to Ashland.

All-weather highways over the Cascade Mountains were not completed until the 1930s and 1940s.

Major road routes through eastern Oregon include I-84 from Ontario to the Columbia River Gorge. The only other interstate freeway in the region is an eleven-mile (18 km) stretch of Interstate 82 that ends at the Columbia River in Umatilla. Other major east–west routes include U.S. Route 26, U.S. Route 30, U.S. Route 20 and U.S. Route 730. U.S. Route 395 is a major north–south route, passing through Pendleton, Burns, John Day, and Lakeview. Further west, U.S. Route 97 runs north and south from the California border through Klamath Falls, Bend, and Redmond to Biggs Junction on the Columbia River.

== See also ==
- Regions of Oregon

== Notes ==
a.The State of Oregon legally identifies this eighteen-county region as Eastern Oregon.
