= Volney Rattan =

American botanist (1840–1915)

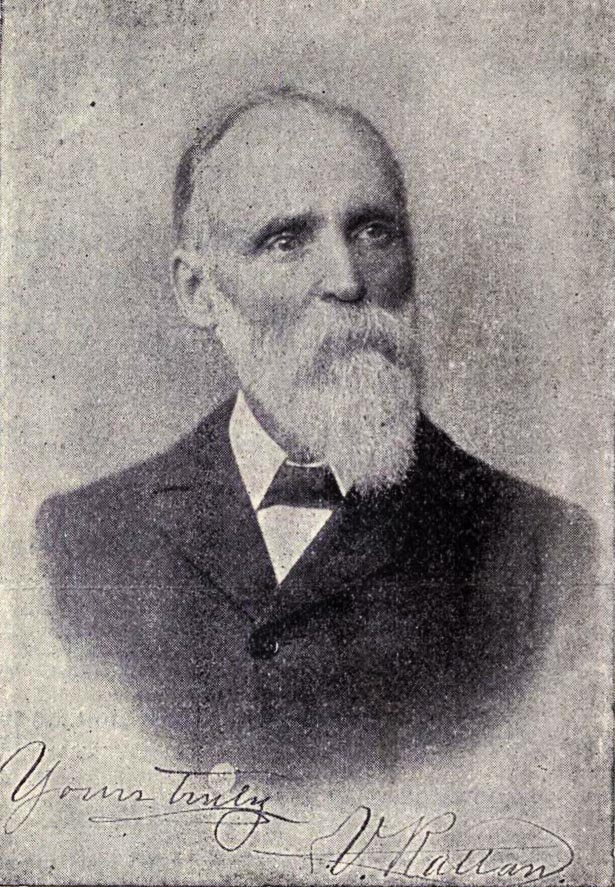
- Born: May 23, 1840; Monroe, Wisconsin Territory
- Died: March 4, 1915 (aged 74); Berkeley, California
- Known for: Early California botanist and botany teacher
- Spouse: Jane Rattan
- Scientific career
- Fields: Botany
- Author abbrev. (botany): Rattan

Signature
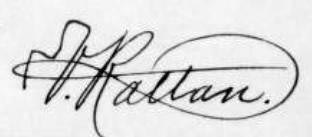

Volney Rattan (May 23, 1840 – March 4, 1915) was an American botanist (collector and teacher) who spent most of his professional life in California. He botanized in remote and wild areas of northwest California, finding many species new to science. He corresponded with eminent botanists Asa Gray and George Engelmann, and sent specimens to them. He was an inspiring teacher, and wrote books to help those with botanical interests to learn principles of taxonomy, and to help them identify native plants of California. Many plant species have been named after him.

== Biography ==
Volney Rattan was born in Monroe, Wisconsin on May 23, 1840. He was educated in Wisconsin, including three years (1857–1860) at the University of Wisconsin. In 1861 he took the Overland Trail to California, settling first at Placerville, where he took up work in the public schools. Later, he taught at high schools in Santa Cruz and San Francisco, and, in 1889, was called upon to teach botany at the California State Normal School (now San Jose State University), where he remained until his retirement in 1906. Rattan died March 5, 1915 and was buried in Oakland.

== Books ==
In 1879 Rattan published the first edition of a book designed to help his students, and others, to learn to identify California plants. The second edition, in 1880, contained many of his own illustrations of plant morphology and taxonomic terms. Subsequent revised and enlarged editions appeared through 1905. These, along with some related texts, may be viewed on the internet.

Willis Linn Jepson, preeminent California botanist, wrote of Rattan (in the first of Jepson's essay series on The Botanical Explorers of California):

It can well be said that in those early days he did more for botanical teaching in the public schools and for wide diffusion of interest in the native flora amongst the people of California than any other man. His "Popular California Flora" was well suited to its purpose and it has given to thousands of Californians a pleasure in the fields and forests which they associate with their earliest experience of wild life. In some ways a matter of fact and practical book, yet it had an engaging interest and even charm, due mainly to the many excellent old-time wood engravings made after Volney Rattan's own drawings.

It has been suggested that Jepson, as a high school student, had one of Rattan's books as his first book on plants.

== Plants (collecting, eponymous scientific names) ==
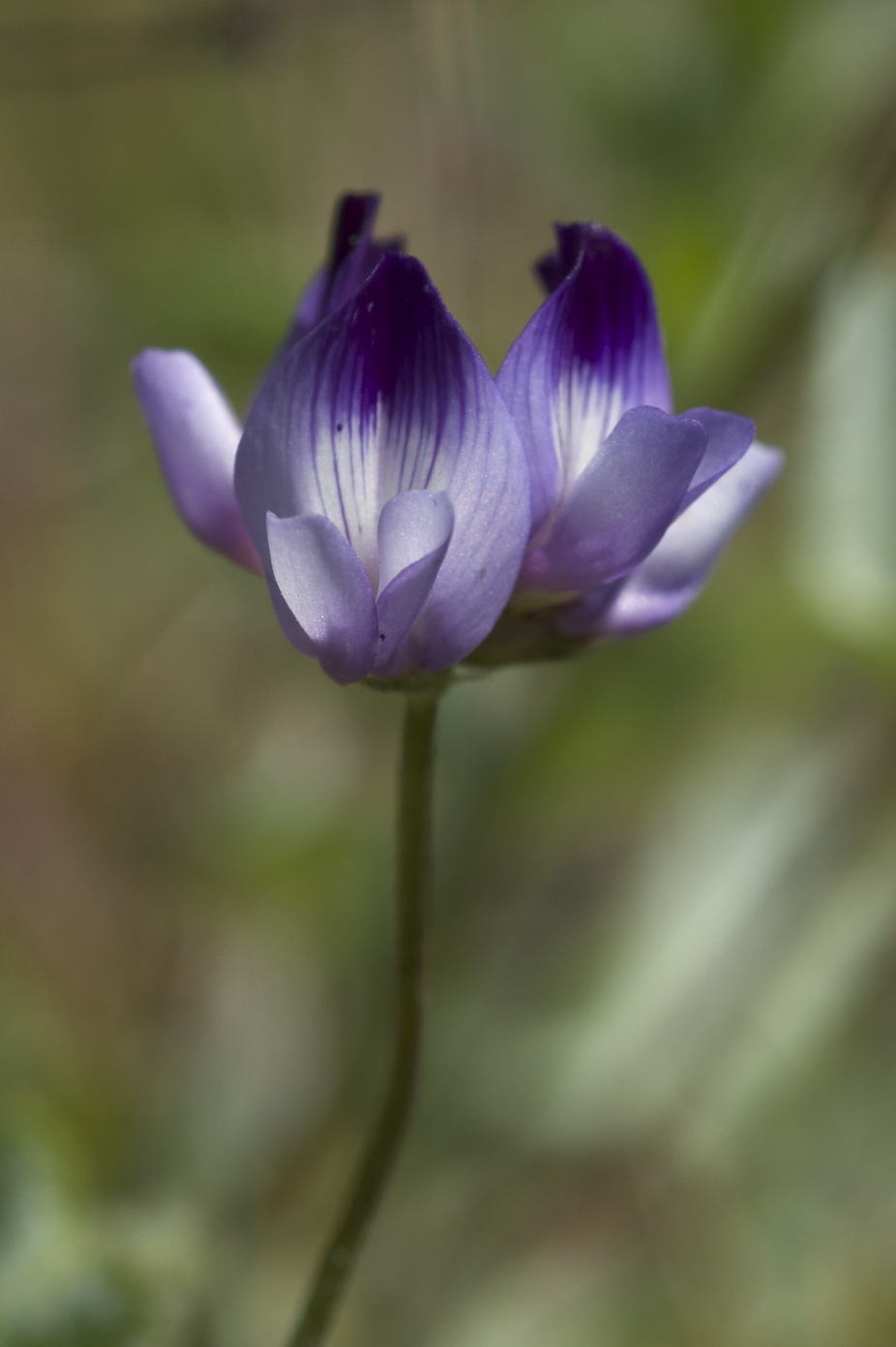
Astragalus rattanii A. Gray var. jepsonianus Barneby

In letters to Asa Gray and George Engelmann, Rattan told of some of his collecting trips to rugged areas of northwest California (Humboldt and other counties), during summer vacations starting in 1878. He traveled from San Francisco to Humboldt Bay via "steamer". From there he went overland on foot or by horse along back roads and "Indian trails". Many of the previously unknown plants he sent to those gentlemen were named in his honor by them; other prominent botanists, including California botanist Edward Lee Greene and Asa Gray associate Sereno Watson, also named plant species in Rattan's honor. A few plants were also named by Rattan. International Plant Names Index lists 58 such species. (Some are synonyms, or no longer accepted; cf. The Plant List.)

The standard author abbreviation Rattan is used to indicate this person as the author when citing a botanical name.
