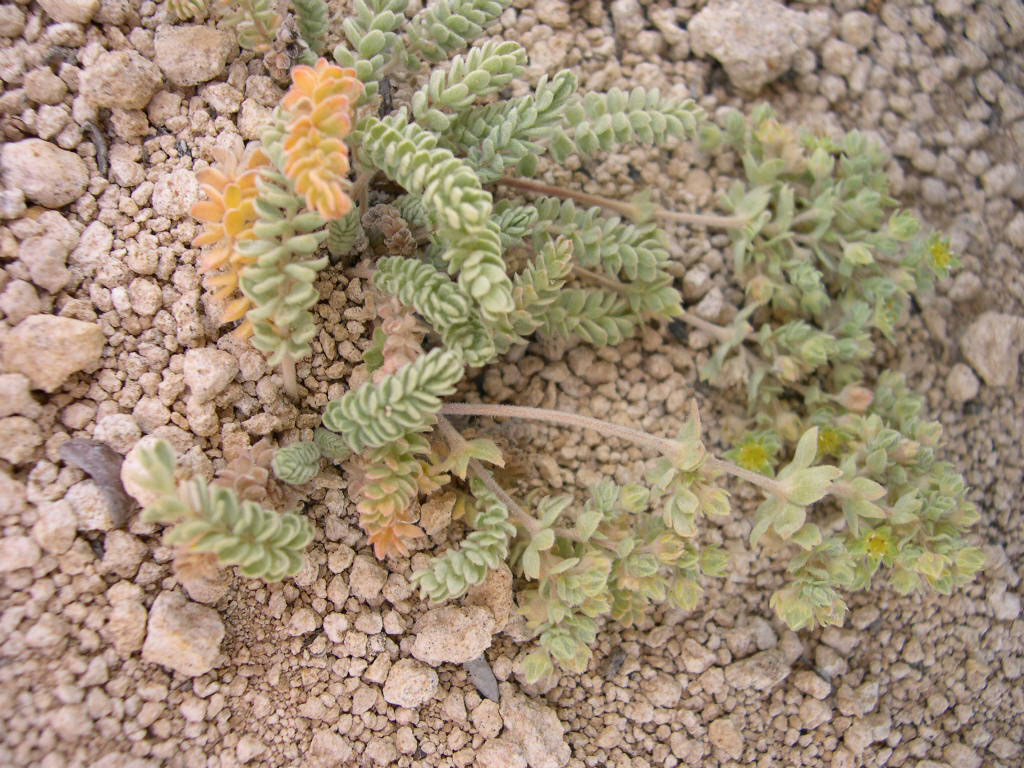

Conservation status
- Imperiled (NatureServe)

Scientific classification
- Kingdom: Plantae
- Clade: Tracheophytes
- Clade: Angiosperms
- Clade: Eudicots
- Clade: Rosids
- Order: Rosales
- Family: Rosaceae
- Genus: Potentilla
- Species: P. rhypara

Binomial name
- Potentilla rhypara (Ertter & Reveal) Mosyakin & Shiyan

Synonyms
- Ivesia rhypara Ertter & Reveal

= Potentilla rhypara =

Species of flowering plant

Potentilla rhypara, also known as grimy mousetail and grimy ivesia, is a species of flowering plant in the rose family. It is native to Oregon and Nevada in the United States.

== Description ==
Potentilla rhypara is a perennial herb that grows from woody roots and a branching caudex. It has hairy, overlapping, compound basal leaves and stems up to 15 centimeters long. At the ends of the stems are clustered white or pale-yellow flowers. Blooming occurs in May through October.

== Taxonomy ==
The species epithet rhypara ("grimy" in Greek) is derived from its dusty appearance and from its discoverer, James W. Grimes.

There are two varieties of this plant. The var. rhypara grows on barren tuff and var. shellyi grows in rock cracks and crevices on pumice and tuff. When the plants grow in rock fissures they sometimes appear to be lined up in rows. Associated plants include Purshia tridentata, Poa sandbergii, Gilia congesta, Sitanion hystrix, Scutellaria nana, and Eriophyllum lanatum.

== Threats ==
Threats to this species, particularly var. rhypara, include gold mining, as the habitat contains gold deposits. Other threats include cattle, off-road vehicles, fire suppression, and loss of pollinating insects.
