= Sparta, Oregon =

Unincorporated community in the state of Oregon, United States

- Unincorporated community
- Location within Oregon Location within the United States
- Coordinates: 44°52′16″N 117°19′27″W
- Country: United States
- State: Oregon
- County: Baker
- Elevation: 4,111 ft (1,253 m)
- Time zone: UTC-8 (Pacific (PST))
  - Summer (DST): UTC-7 (PDT)
- Area codes: 458 and 541
- GNIS feature ID: 1136770

Sparta is an unincorporated community in Baker County, Oregon, United States. It was named for Sparta, Illinois, by William H. Packwood, a prominent Oregon pioneer who visited the gold diggings at the Powder River there in 1871.

By 1873, the population was 300 and the town had a general store, a hotel, a meat market, and a brewery; food came from the nearby Eagle Valley.

The town was platted in 1872, and the post office was established in 1872 and ran until 1952. The post office was originally named "Gem" in 1871 and was moved about a mile east when it was renamed Sparta to match the established community. The locale was also known as "Eagle City".

== See also ==
- List of ghost towns in Oregon
