= Western Oregon =

Geographic region of Oregon, USA

Coordinates: 44.2°N 123.3°W

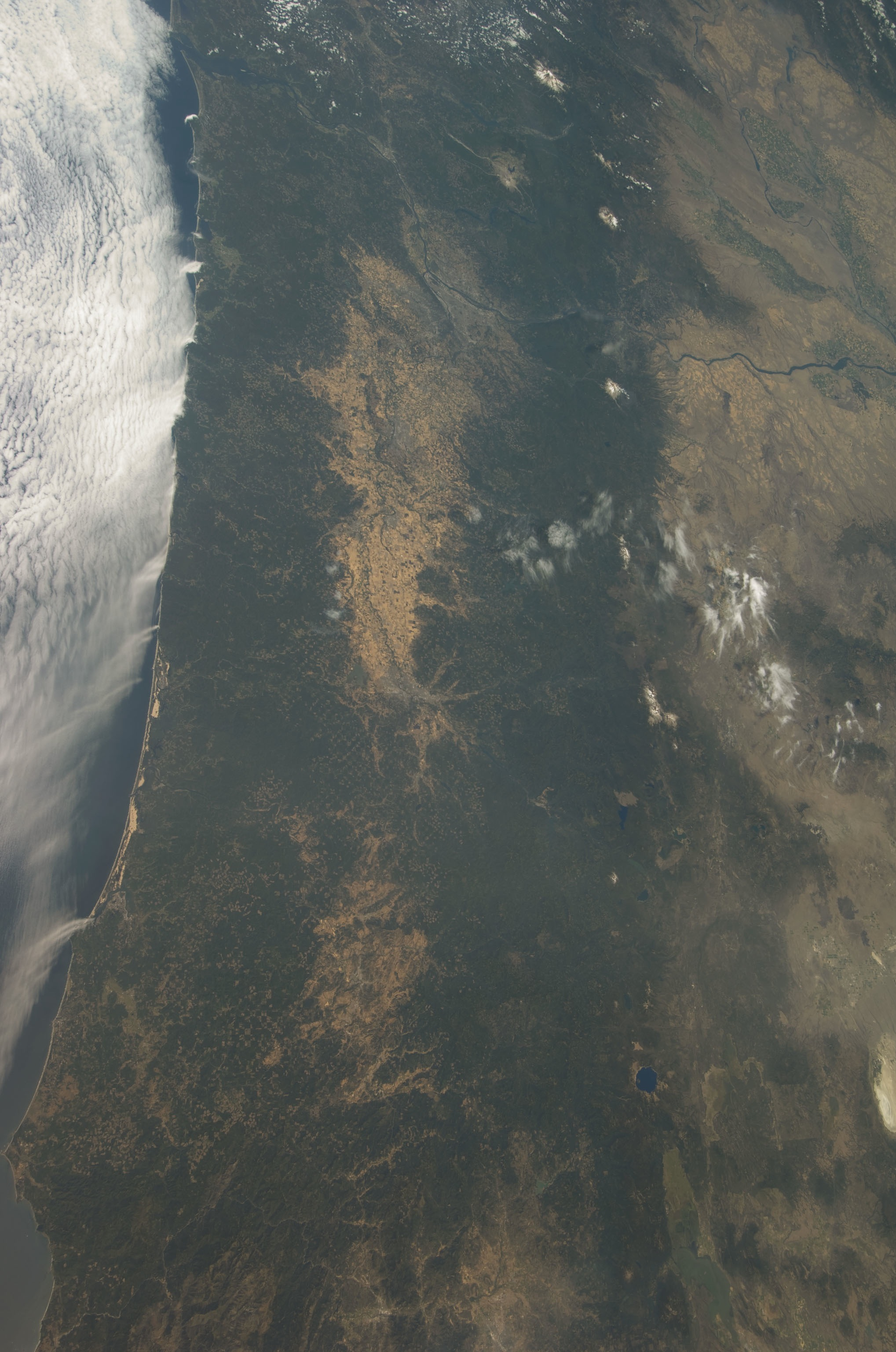
View from the International Space Station showing Western Oregon

Western Oregon is a geographical term that is generally taken to mean the part of the U.S. state of Oregon within 120 miles (190 km) of the state’s coastal region, on the west side of the crest of the Cascade Range. The term is applied somewhat loosely, however, and is sometimes taken to exclude the southwestern areas of the state, which are often referred to as Southern Oregon. In that case, Western Oregon refers only to the counties west of the Cascades and north of and including Lane County.

Western Oregon, being 120 by 250 miles (190 by 400 km) in area, is about the same size as New England minus Maine. Unlike the climate of Eastern Oregon, which is primarily dry and continental, the climate of Western Oregon is generally a moderate Mediterranean climate.

== See also ==
- Northwest Oregon
