= National Weather Service Boise, Idaho =

Weather Forecast Office of the National Weather Service

National Weather Service Forecast Office in Boise, Idaho
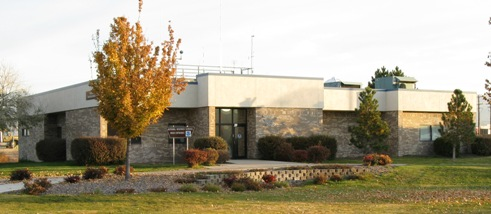
- The National Weather Service Boise office.

Agency overview
- Formed: July 1, 1877; 149 years ago
- Preceding agencies: United States Signal Service Station in Boise, Idaho; United States Weather Bureau Office in Boise, Idaho
- Jurisdiction: Federal Government of the United States
- Headquarters: 3833 South Development Avenue #3807 Boise, Idaho 83705; 43°34′2.27″N 116°12′41.38″W
- Employees: 25
- Agency executives: Michael Canton, Meteorologist in Charge; Jay Breidenbach, Warning Coordination Meteorologist; Jaret Rogers, Science Operations Officer; Travis Mayer, Electronic Systems Analyst
- Parent agency: National Weather Service
- Website: www.weather.gov/boise

Footnotes
- First weather observation in Boise, Idaho was taken at Fort Boise on February 1, 1864; 162 years ago.

The National Weather Service Boise, Idaho is a weather forecast office responsible for weather forecasts, warnings and local statements as well as aviation weather forecasts and fire weather forecasts for 3 counties in Southeast Oregon and 14 counties in Southwest and South central Idaho. The U.S. Weather Bureau established an office in the Sonna Building on December 1, 1898. Since then, the U.S Weather Bureau office, now known as the National Weather Service forecast office gained forecast responsibility of Southern Idaho on June 22, 1970 which was expanded to the entire state of Idaho in 1973. After modernization in 1993, the forecast responsibility was changed to Southeast Oregon and Southwest Idaho. The current office in Boise maintains a WSR-88D (NEXRAD) radar system, 8 Automated airport weather station (ASOS) systems and Advanced Weather Interactive Processing System (AWIPS) that greatly improve forecasting in the region. Continuous weather observations have been maintained for the city of Boise since February 1, 1864 about 5 months after the U.S. Army established Fort Boise. The post surgeon for the U.S. Army took observations until July 1, 1877 when the U.S. Signal Service, established an office downtown. The Signal Office was discontinued on July 1, 1890.

== History ==
=== Observations at Fort Boise (1864–1898) ===
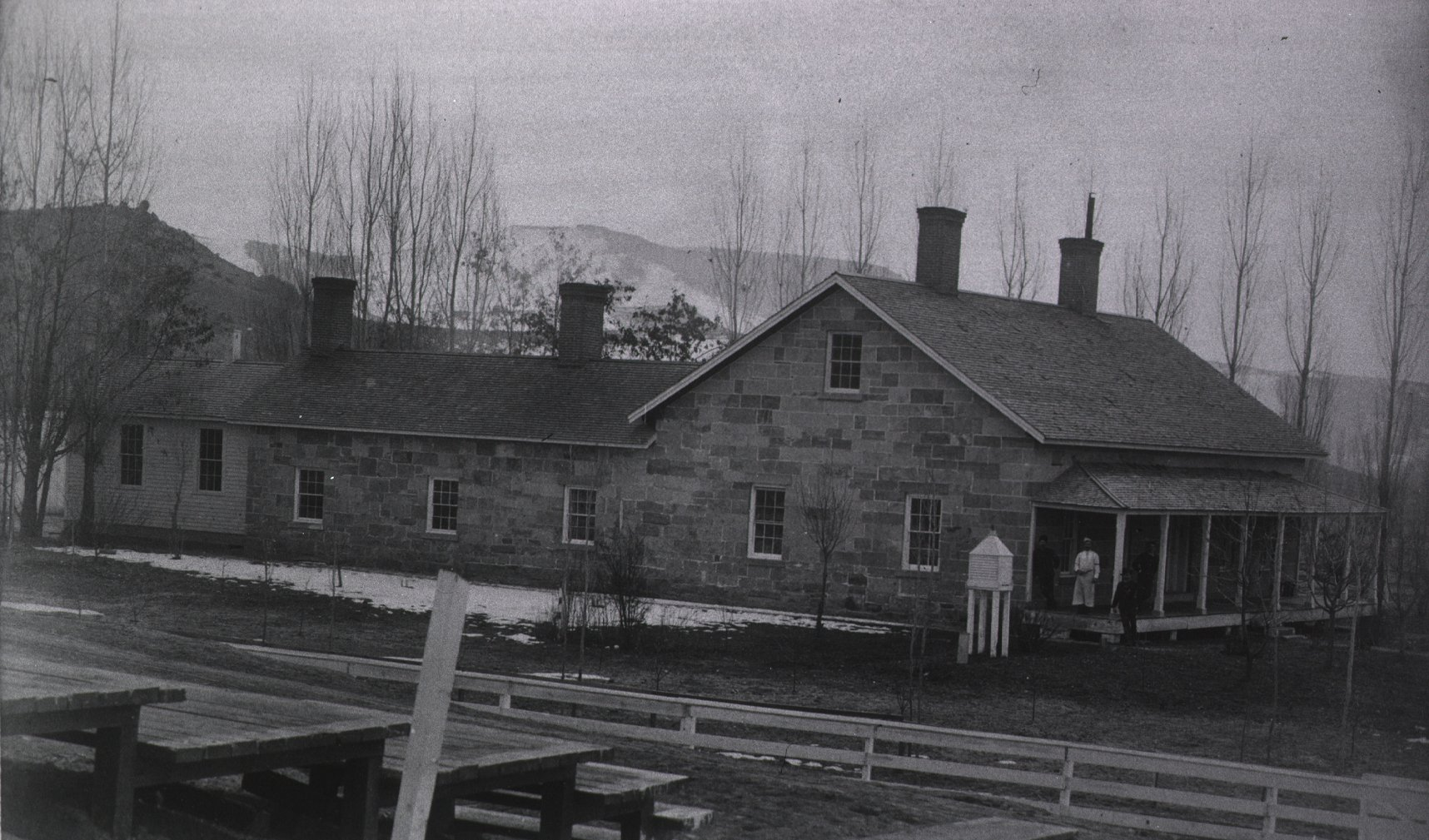
Weather Instruments next to the Post Hospital at Fort Boise circa 1890s.

The first meteorological observations of high and low temperature and daily precipitation began at Fort Boise's Post Hospital on February 1, 1864 about 7 months after the fort was established by Major Pinkney Lugenbeel. Doctor Adam H. Cochrane, born in Paisley, Scotland, was the first post surgeon at the Fort and is believed to have taken the first weather observation. The observations were taken 3 times a day, 7 A.M., 2 P.M., and 7 P.M., at the post hospital built in 1863. Though the thermometers were sheltered, self registering thermometers were not installed until January 1872. Post surgeons and hospital stewards took continuous daily weather observations through November 30, 1898. The post surgeon was required to take weather observations as it was believed there was a possible link between human disease and weather. This prompted the Surgeon General of the U.S. Army, Doctor James Tilton to order U.S. Army senior medical officers on 2 May 1814 to “keep a diary of the weather” at each military station. The Fort was later renamed the Boise Barracks.

=== U.S. Army's Signal Service Office (1877–1890) ===
Former Idaho Territory Governor and former U.S. House of Representative Thomas W. Bennett made an application to the U.S. Army's Signal Service to establish stations at Boise on February 9, 1876. On May 21, 1877, the application was granted and Sergeant Barnet E. Light was order per S. O. No. 62 to establish a station by July 1877. On June 22, 1877, the station was established on the second floor of the Overland Hotel on the northwest corner of 8th and Main Street. Weather observations began at the station on July 1, 1977. The station was moved to a third story addition to the Hotel shortly after Hosea Eastman bought it in 1878. The station was moved twice, next door to the Davis building in September 1880 and the Perrault Building on the southeast corner of Capital and Main Streets in January 1888. The weather instruments were on the roof except for the thermometers which were in a window shelter from 1877 to 1885. The thermometers placed in a Cotton region shelter on December 1, 1885. A lack of funding and Chief Signal Officer Adolphus Greely opening of a new station in Baker City, Oregon lead to the closure of the Boise station on June 30, 1890. Greenly felt the Baker City Station would be more valuable than the Boise station which was not supported by his forecasters in Washington. Barnet Light, James Kenealy, Henry Boynton and William Korts were the only four observers during the stations 13 years in Boise.

=== U.S. Weather Bureau in Downtown Boise (1898–1939) ===
George L. Shoup, the first Governor and Senator of Idaho, began discussing with the Chief of the U.S. Weather Bureau Willis L. Moore on establishing an office in Boise, Idaho in 1897. Both Chief Moore and the Secretary of Agriculture James Wilson supported the establishment of an office in Boise, Idaho which was added to the budget. The office was scheduled to be open in August 1898 but was delayed due to the U.S. Weather Bureau's expansion into the West Indies. On 29 September 1898, the Chief Moore sent the following order:

“Mr. Samuel M. Blandford will proceed from Salt Lake City, Utah to Boise, Idaho, to establish and assume charge of a Weather Bureau station at the latter point.”

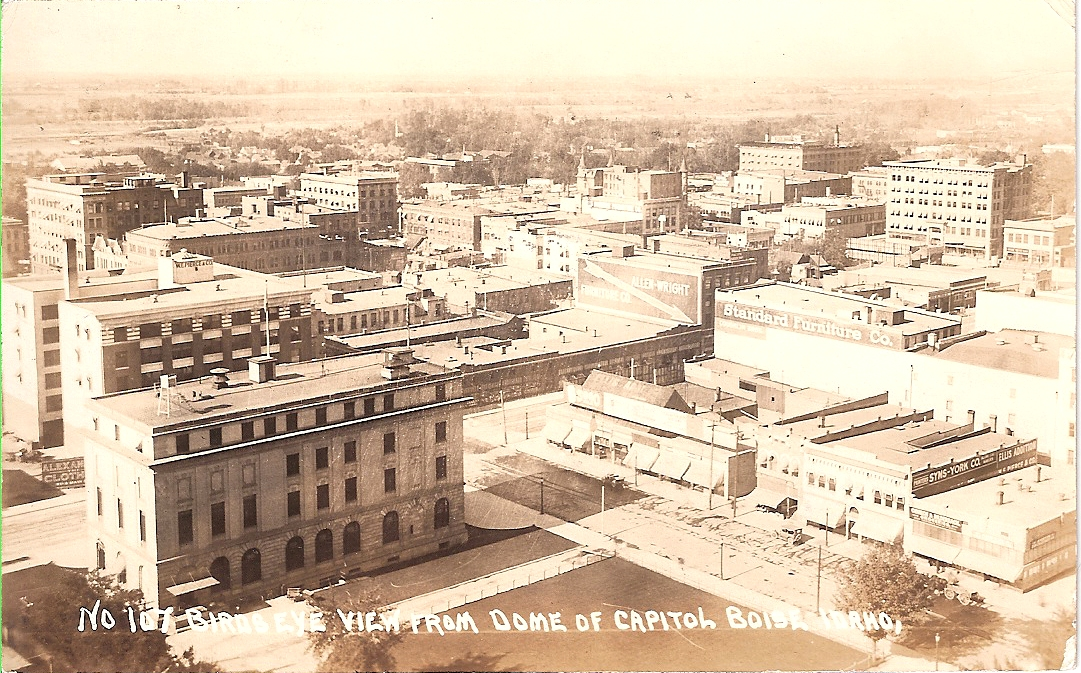
The U.S. Weather Bureau instruments on the U.S. Federal Building roof in downtown Boise.

Samuel Blandford was an experienced meteorologist and lawyer who worked at several Weather Bureau offices across the United States mostly in the west. He began his career with the U.S. Signal Service and worked at the station in New York City during the Great Blizzard of 1888 which he believed eventually gave him tuberculosis. He was the nephew of Dr. Samuel Mudd.

The office was opened on the third floor of the Sonna Building on the corner of 9th and Main Street on December 1, 1898. Blandford had two assistants, John C. Dabney and Charles C. Garrett who help take observation and post the forecasts.

The office moved to the fourth floor of the U.S. Federal Building now known as the U.S. Public Building on March 16, 1905. The building was expanded in the late 1920s and the U.S. Weather Bureau moved to the fourth floor of the new annex on November 13, 1930. In additions to the regular surface observations of temperature, precipitation and wind, the office started taking PIBAL observations from the roof of the building.

A U.S. Weather Bureau Airport Station was established at the downtown Boise Airport, now the campus of Boise State University, on May 11, 1933 which is only about a 1-mile south of the U.S. Federal Building. Weather observations had been taken from the airport by the Bureau of Air Commerce personal since October 18, 1931. From July 1, 1939 to December 18, 1939, while the U.S. Weather Bureau office was moved to the airport at Gowen Field, official weather observations and one PIBAL flight a day were taken at the old airport.

=== U.S. Weather Bureau at the Boise Airport (1939–1969) ===
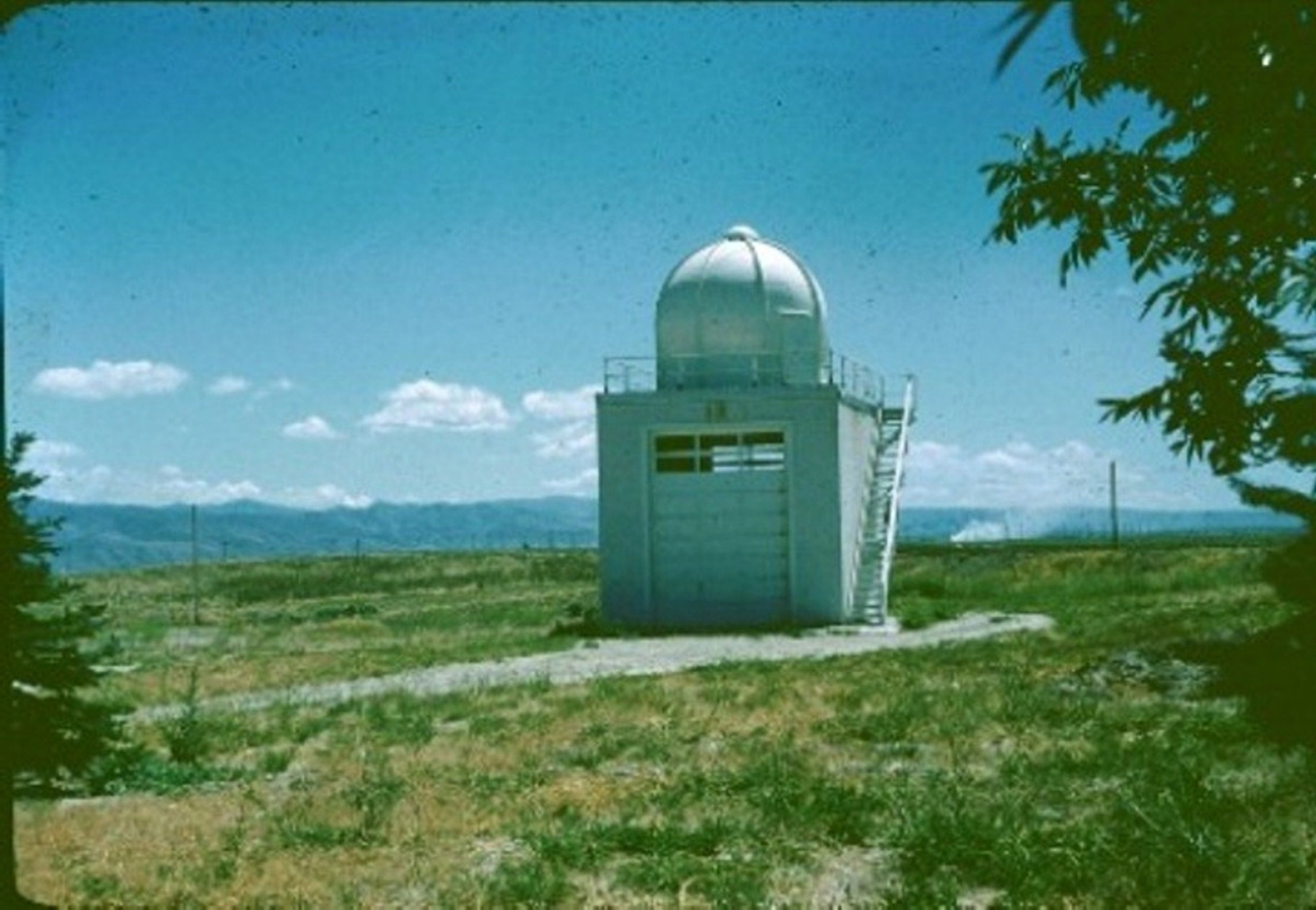
Balloon inflation building at the Boise Airport in 1956.

The U.S. Weather Bureau office was moved to 2nd floor of the original Boise Air Terminal Building at Gowen Field on December 19, 1939. All operations at the U.S. Federal building and the old Boise Airport were transferred to the new office by February 20, 1940. In addition to the surface weather observations of temperature, precipitation and wind, Radiosonde observations which began September 1, 1939 at the downtown airport, were moved to a small building north of the Boise terminal building at Gowen Field in 1940. A new balloon inflation building was built east of the terminal in October 1954 with a dome on top to hold the signal receiving equipment. The building was moved to the NIFC campus in August 1969 where it is still being used today. The temperatures and precipitation were taken near the airport terminal building through 1969 though they were moved periodically to accommodate the growing airport. The wind instrument was moved several times through 1969 from the top of the United Hangar to the top of the terminal building to field northwest of the runway. The office remained on the 2nd floor of the terminal building until June 1969.

=== National Weather Service at the National Interagency Fire Center (1969–Present) ===
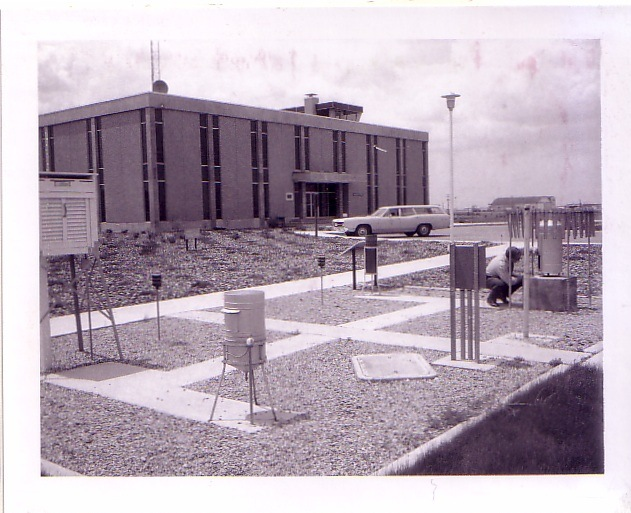
Weather Instruments at the old NIFC Administration Building on June 7, 1972.

The National Interagency Fire Center (NIFC), was created in 1965 as a way for the U.S. Forest Service, Bureau of Land Management (BLM), and the U.S. Weather Bureau to work together, reduce the duplication of services, and coordinate national fire planning and operations. The U.S. Weather Bureau office was moved to the second floor of the old administration building on June 5, 1969. The U.S. Weather Bureau made the Boise office its “hub of fire weather activities” in the west where fire weather specialists are able to make face to face contact with the Forest Service and Bureau of Land Management fire dispatchers. U.S. Congress approved the Environmental Science Services Administration (ESSA) requested for $316,000 in additional funds in the fiscal year 1970 budget in July 1969 for the Boise, Idaho, Indianapolis, Indiana, and Philadelphia, Pennsylvania; and for bringing Oklahoma City, Oklahoma up to full Weather Service Forecast Office (WSFO) status. On June 22, 1970, the Boise Forecast Office began issuing official weather forecasts for Idaho south of the Salmon River. The U.S. Weather Bureau changed their name to the National Weather Service on October 1, 1970.

The Boise office, which was already a forecast office for the state of Idaho, and Pocatello, Idaho were selected for modernization in the state of Idaho in the early 1990s. On May 20, 1992, the National Weather Service broke ground on the first weather service specific building in Idaho. Construction on the building was completed on June 24, 1993 and the office was officially opened on July 21, 1993. As part of the modernization plan, new weather forecast offices were built, computer systems upgraded and weather radars were installed across the country. The first weather radar in Idaho, WSR-88D, was installed in Boise, just south of the airport, on September 23, 1993 and officially commissioned on January 11, 1995. This was the 47th Doppler weather radar installed in a new national network known as "NEXRAD". Idaho has two such radars, one in Boise, Idaho (KCBX) and the other in Pocatello, Idaho (KSFX). The National Weather Service continues to operate from this building today.

== Former Weather Service Stations in the area ==
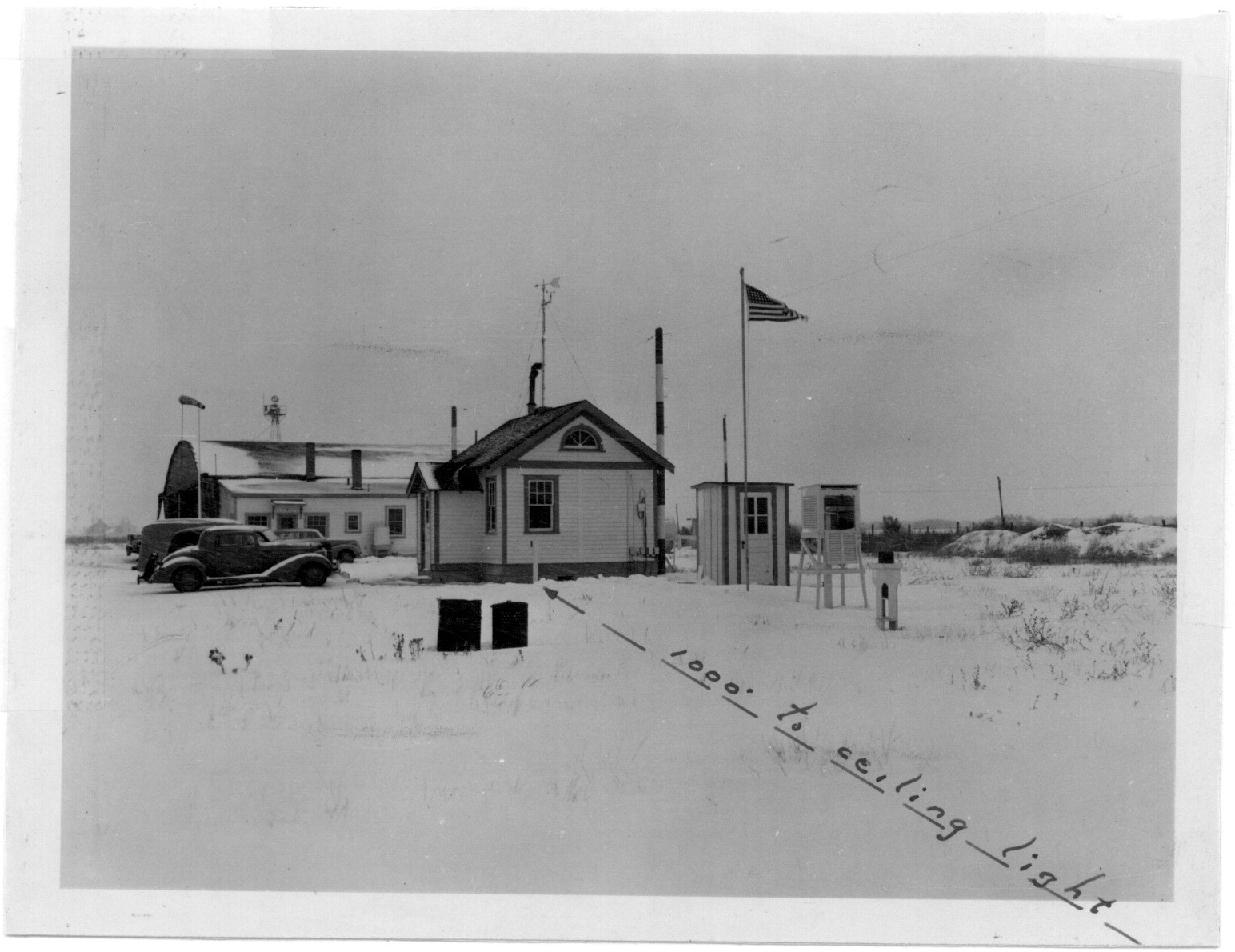
U.S. Weather Bureau Airways Station at the Baker City Airport on March 6, 1944.

The U.S. Weather Bureau operated four airway stations, at Burns, Oregon, Baker City, Oregon, Ontario, Oregon and Weiser, Idaho in the 1930s and 1940s. The Burns station became a U.S. Weather Bureau Airways station on December 13, 1930 and later a U.S. Weather Bureau office on September 1, 1940. Observations continued in the city until February 15, 1980 when the office was moved to the Burns Airport. The office was closed after the Automated Surface Observing Systems (ASOS) was installed on July 1, 1995. The U.S. Signal Service closed the station in Boise, Idaho to establish a station in Baker city, Oregon on July 10, 1889 which remained in operation until May 14, 1953. The U.S. Weather Bureau opened an Airways station at the Baker City Airport north of the city on March 29, 1939 which was closed on February 10, 1949. Observations were continued by the FAA until the ASOS system was installed in October 2001. A U.S. Weather Bureau Airways Station was established at Weiser Airport on July 4, 1932 but was moved to the Ontario Municipal Airport on October 25, 1938. The airways station in Ontario was only in operation until December 4, 1946. Observations were continued at the airport by the airlines until the ASOS system installed in April 1997. U.S Weather Bureau opened an Agricultural Service Office east of Twin Falls, Idaho in Kimberly, Idaho on April 19, 1962. The National Weather Service made it a Cooperative Observer Program (COOP) station for the USDA Agricultural Service on May 1, 1996. An ASOS station was installed at the Magic Valley Regional Airport south of Twin Falls, Idaho on January 28, 1997.

== Operations ==
WFO Boise operates 24 hours a day, 365 days a year and provides weather forecasts, warnings, aviation forecast and local statements for Southeast Oregon and Southwest Idaho. There is one WSR-88D (NEXRAD) radar upgraded to dual polarization on August 30, 2012 improving the accuracy and identification of precipitation types and precipitation estimates. The office is also equipped with an Advanced Weather Interactive Processing System (AWIPS II) that greatly increases monitoring capabilities of weather, satellite, and computer model data by forecasters. The office also maintains eight Automated Surface Observing Systems (ASOS) around the area. NWS Boise employs 18 meteorologist of which two are dedicated Fire Weather Forecasters and Incident Meteorologists and one hydrologist. There are also 7 support staff members that provide technical, administrative and IT support.

=== Area of Responsibility ===
The National Weather Service Boise, Idaho provides weather forecasts, warnings and local statements for 3 counties in Southeast Oregon and 14 counties in Southwest and South central Idaho.

==== Oregon Counties ====
- Baker
- Harney
- Malheur

==== Idaho Counties ====
- Ada
- Adams
- Boise
- Camas
- Canyon
- Elmore
- Gem
- Gooding
- Jerome
- Owyhee
- Payette
- Twin Falls
- Valley
- Washington

=== Aviation Forecasts ===
The Boise Office issues aviation forecasts for the following eight regional airports:

- Boise Airport
- Caldwell Industrial Airport
- Ontario Municipal Airport
- Magic Valley Regional Airport
- Jerome County Airport
- McCall Municipal Airport
- Baker City Municipal Airport
- Burns Municipal Airport.

=== NOAA Weather Radio ===
The Boise Weather Forecast Office maintains five NOAA Weather Radio transmitters across southwest Idaho and southeast Oregon. They transmit routine extended and specialized short-term forecasts, current weather observations, hazardous weather outlooks and historical weather information. Each of the transmitters, through the Emergency Alert System, also disseminate watches, warnings and advisories issued by the NWS office, severe thunderstorm and tornado watches issued by the Storm Prediction Center and other emergency information to the public.

==== Stations ====
City of license	Call sign	Frequency (MHz)	Power (W)
Boise	WXK68	162.55 MHz	300 W
McCall	WWF58	162.475 MHz	100 W
Payette	WXK88	162.40 MHz	100 W
Twin Falls	WXL35	162.40 MHz	300 W
Burns	KHB30	162.475 MHz	300 W

=== Climate Sites ===
The office issues daily climate reports for eight locations.

- Idaho
  - Boise
  - Mountain Home
  - Twin Falls
  - Jerome
  - McCall
- Oregon
  - Burns
  - Baker City
  - Ontario
  - Rome
