= Ontario, Oregon =

- City
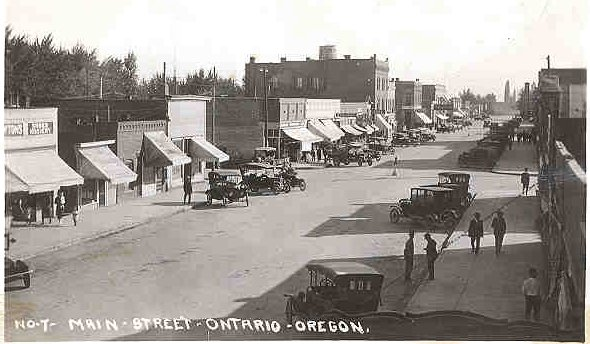
- Main Street (now Oregon Street) looking south, early 1920s

- Logo
- Motto: Where Oregon Begins
- Location in Oregon
- Coordinates: 44°1′37″N 116°58′7″W
- Country: United States
- State: Oregon
- County: Malheur
- Incorporated: 1899
- Named for: Ontario, Canada

Government
  - Mayor: Deborah Folden

Area
  - Total: 5.17 sq mi (13.38 km^{2})
  - Land: 5.17 sq mi (13.38 km^{2})
  - Water: 0 sq mi (0.00 km^{2})
- Elevation: 2,149 ft (655 m)

Population (2020)
  - Total: 11,645
  - Density: 2,254.4/sq mi (870.42/km^{2})
- Time zone: UTC−7 (Mountain)
  - Summer (DST): UTC−6 (Mountain)
- ZIP Code: 97914
- Area code: 541
- FIPS code: 41-54900
- GNIS feature ID: 1125001
- Website: www.ontariooregon.org

Ontario is the largest city in Malheur County, Oregon, United States. It lies along the Snake River at the Idaho border. The population was 11,645 at the 2020 census. The city is the largest community in the region of far eastern Oregon, also known as the Western Treasure Valley.

Ontario is the principal city of the Ontario, OR-ID Micropolitan Statistical Area, which includes Malheur County in Oregon and Payette County in Idaho.

Ontario is approximately halfway between Portland and Salt Lake City. It is the closest city to the Idaho border along Interstate 84. The city's slogan is "Where Oregon Begins".

== History ==
Ontario was founded on June 11, 1883, by developers William Morfitt, Mary Richardson, Daniel Smith, and James Virtue. In March 1884, Richard Welch started a post office for the quarter of Ontario, so named by James Virtue after Ontario, Canada. Two months later Joseph Morton applied for a Morton post office at an island about one mile south of town, with Oscar Scott as postmaster. Unfortunately for Morton and Scott, merchants Morfitt and Richardson of Malheur City, gold miner Virtue, and lumberman Smith of Baker City acquired more land and were better financed. More importantly, Morfitt had negotiated a train depot for Ontario. All the settlers and speculators knew the railroad was coming and how important that would be to Ontario's future so Scott closed his Morton post office and built a hotel at present-day Ontario. By December 1884, Scott was Ontario's postmaster.

The town continued to grow with the arrival of the Oregon Short Line Railroad in later 1884, and freight and passenger service were added to the town's offerings. Soon after, stock began arriving from Eastern Oregon's cattle ranches to Ontario's stockyard for transshipment to markets throughout the Pacific Northwest. Ontario became one of the largest stockyards in the West. In addition, the construction of the Nevada Ditch and other canals aided the burgeoning agricultural industry, adding those products to Ontario's exports.

Ontario was incorporated by the Oregon Legislative Assembly on February 11, 1899.

A city by the time of World War II, Ontario Mayor Elmo Smith allowed Japanese Americans to settle at a time when much of the West Coast supported their exclusion. Smith told the Associated Press "If the Japs, both alien and nationals, are a menace to the Pacific Coast safety unless they are moved inland, it appears downright cowardly to take any other stand than to put out the call, 'Send them along; we'll cooperate to the fullest possible extent in taking care of them.'" A population of about 134 in the city and surrounding county before the war ballooned to 1,000 as the county recruited farm workers during the war.

=== Cannabis legalization ===
Since 2019, cannabis dispensaries have been an important part of Ontario's economy and a notable example of the border effect.

In November 2018, voters overturned a ban on recreational marijuana dispensaries in the town, several years after Oregon legalized recreational marijuana use. As Ontario borders Idaho (where marijuana remains illegal for all purposes), local news outlets reported that by November 2019 the city's dispensaries were generating a significant amount of revenue from Idaho residents driving across the state line. Total cannabis sales from Ontario dispensaries topped $100 million in December 2020.

== Geography ==
Ontario is in northeastern Malheur County, bordered to the east by the Snake River, which forms the state line with Idaho. The city is located at an elevation of 2,150 feet (660 m) above sea level. Via Interstate 84 it is 30 miles (48 km) northwest of Caldwell, Idaho, and 56 miles (90 km) northwest of Boise, as well as 73 miles (117 km) southeast of Baker City, Oregon.

According to the U.S. Census Bureau, the city of Ontario has a total area of 5.99 square miles (15.51 km^{2}), of which 0.001 square miles (0.003 km^{2}), or 0.02%, are water.

=== Climate ===
Ontario has a borderline cool semi-arid (Köppen BSk)/continental Mediterranean (Dsa) climate. As is common with the high deserts of Oregon, winters are freezing and dry, while summers are hot, dry and sunny. The record high temperature of 113 °F (45.0 °C) was observed on August 4, 1961, and July 12, 1967, while the record low of −25 °F (−31.7 °C) was observed on January 27, 1957, and January 22, 1962. On average, Ontario experiences 60.8 afternoons with high temperatures of at least 90 °F (32.2 °C), 10.5 afternoons with high temperatures of at least 100 °F (37.8 °C), 128.4 morningd with low temperatures at or below 32 °F (0 °C), and 2.1 mornings with low temperatures at or below 0 °F (−17.8 °C).

The hottest month has been July 2021 with a mean of 85.0 °F or 29.4 °C – although the hottest mean maximum was in July 1960 at 102.7 °F or 39.3 °C – and the coldest January 1949 at 7.0 °F or −13.9 °C. The wettest "rain year" was from July 1968 to June 1969 with 16.05 inches or 407.7 millimeters, and the driest from July 1948 to June 1949 with 5.36 inches or 136.1 millimeters. The most precipitation in one month has been 4.39 inches or 111.5 millimeters, which occurred in January 1970 and in May 1998, while the most in 24 hours is 1.59 inches (40.4 millimeters) on September 14, 1959. Snowfall is light despite the chilly winters due to dryness: the snowiest season was from July 1951 to June 1952 with 36.5 inches or 0.93 meters, and the snowiest month December 1983 with 30.3 inches or 0.77 meters. Contrariwise, a mere 1.0 inch or 0.025 meters of snow fell between July 1965 and June 1966.

Climate data for Ontario Municipal Airport, Ontario, Oregon (1991–2020 normals, extremes 1945–present)
Month	Jan	Feb	Mar	Apr	May	Jun	Jul	Aug	Sep	Oct	Nov	Dec	Year
Record high °F (°C)	64 (18)	69 (21)	85 (29)	94 (34)	103 (39)	109 (43)	113 (45)	113 (45)	104 (40)	93 (34)	74 (23)	66 (19)	113 (45)
Mean maximum °F (°C)	49.1 (9.5)	58.5 (14.7)	71.0 (21.7)	80.1 (26.7)	91.0 (32.8)	98.1 (36.7)	104.2 (40.1)	102.1 (38.9)	94.7 (34.8)	81.5 (27.5)	63.2 (17.3)	52.4 (11.3)	104.7 (40.4)
Mean daily maximum °F (°C)	38.3 (3.5)	46.9 (8.3)	58.4 (14.7)	66.0 (18.9)	76.4 (24.7)	84.7 (29.3)	95.1 (35.1)	93.4 (34.1)	82.7 (28.2)	66.9 (19.4)	49.8 (9.9)	38.9 (3.8)	66.5 (19.2)
Daily mean °F (°C)	31.3 (−0.4)	37.5 (3.1)	46.1 (7.8)	52.7 (11.5)	62.1 (16.7)	69.8 (21.0)	78.3 (25.7)	76.2 (24.6)	66.0 (18.9)	52.8 (11.6)	39.7 (4.3)	31.6 (−0.2)	53.7 (12.1)
Mean daily minimum °F (°C)	24.3 (−4.3)	28.0 (−2.2)	33.9 (1.1)	39.4 (4.1)	47.9 (8.8)	54.9 (12.7)	61.5 (16.4)	58.9 (14.9)	49.2 (9.6)	38.7 (3.7)	29.5 (−1.4)	24.4 (−4.2)	40.9 (4.9)
Mean minimum °F (°C)	6.1 (−14.4)	13.4 (−10.3)	20.5 (−6.4)	24.7 (−4.1)	32.5 (0.3)	41.1 (5.1)	49.5 (9.7)	45.4 (7.4)	35.1 (1.7)	23.7 (−4.6)	14.4 (−9.8)	7.8 (−13.4)	0.8 (−17.3)
Record low °F (°C)	−25 (−32)	−24 (−31)	9 (−13)	17 (−8)	25 (−4)	31 (−1)	34 (1)	33 (1)	24 (−4)	9 (−13)	−6 (−21)	−23 (−31)	−25 (−32)
Average precipitation inches (mm)	1.38 (35)	0.89 (23)	0.97 (25)	0.77 (20)	1.17 (30)	0.72 (18)	0.26 (6.6)	0.12 (3.0)	0.29 (7.4)	0.64 (16)	0.88 (22)	1.39 (35)	9.48 (241)
Average snowfall inches (cm)	3.4 (8.6)	1.2 (3.0)	0.3 (0.76)	0.0 (0.0)	0.0 (0.0)	0.0 (0.0)	0.0 (0.0)	0.0 (0.0)	0.0 (0.0)	0.0 (0.0)	0.3 (0.76)	5.0 (13)	10.2 (26.12)
Average precipitation days (≥ 0.01 in)	9.5	8.3	9.5	7.2	8.1	5.7	1.5	1.8	3.4	5.4	8.3	11.1	79.8
Average snowy days (≥ 0.1 in)	1.8	1.5	0.2	0.0	0.0	0.0	0.0	0.0	0.0	0.0	0.8	2.4	6.7
Source 1: NOAA (snow/snow days 1981–2010)
Source 2: National Weather Service

== Demographics ==
Historical population
Census	Pop.	Note	%±
1890	200		—
1900	445		122.5%
1910	1,248		180.4%
1920	2,039		63.4%
1930	1,941		−4.8%
1940	3,551		82.9%
1950	4,465		25.7%
1960	5,101		14.2%
1970	6,523		27.9%
1980	8,814		35.1%
1990	9,392		6.6%
2000	10,985		17.0%
2010	11,366		3.5%
2020	11,645		2.5%
Sources: U.S. Decennial Census

=== 2020 census ===
Note: the US Census treats Hispanic/Latino as an ethnic category, meaning Hispanics/Latinos can be of any race.

As of the 2020 census, there were 11,645 people, 4,404 households, and 2,491 families residing in the city.

The median age was 34.8 years. 27.2% of residents were under the age of 18 and 17.9% of residents were 65 years of age or older. For every 100 females there were 94.3 males, and for every 100 females age 18 and over there were 90.6 males age 18 and over.

Of the 4,404 households, 32.9% had children under the age of 18 living in them. Of all households, 37.5% were married-couple households, 20.3% were households with a male householder and no spouse or partner present, and 32.9% were households with a female householder and no spouse or partner present. About 31.1% of all households were made up of individuals and 15.3% had someone living alone who was 65 years of age or older.

There were 4,682 housing units, of which 5.9% were vacant. Among occupied housing units, 51.7% were owner-occupied and 48.3% were renter-occupied. The homeowner vacancy rate was 1.3% and the rental vacancy rate was 5.1%.

99.9% of residents lived in urban areas, while 0.1% lived in rural areas.

Racial composition as of the 2020 census
Race	Number	Percent
White	7,010	60.2%
Black or African American	133	1.1%
American Indian and Alaska Native	275	2.4%
Asian	199	1.7%
Native Hawaiian and Other Pacific Islander	18	0.2%
Some other race	2,499	21.5%
Two or more races	1,511	13.0%
Hispanic or Latino (of any race)	5,049	43.4%

=== 2010 census ===
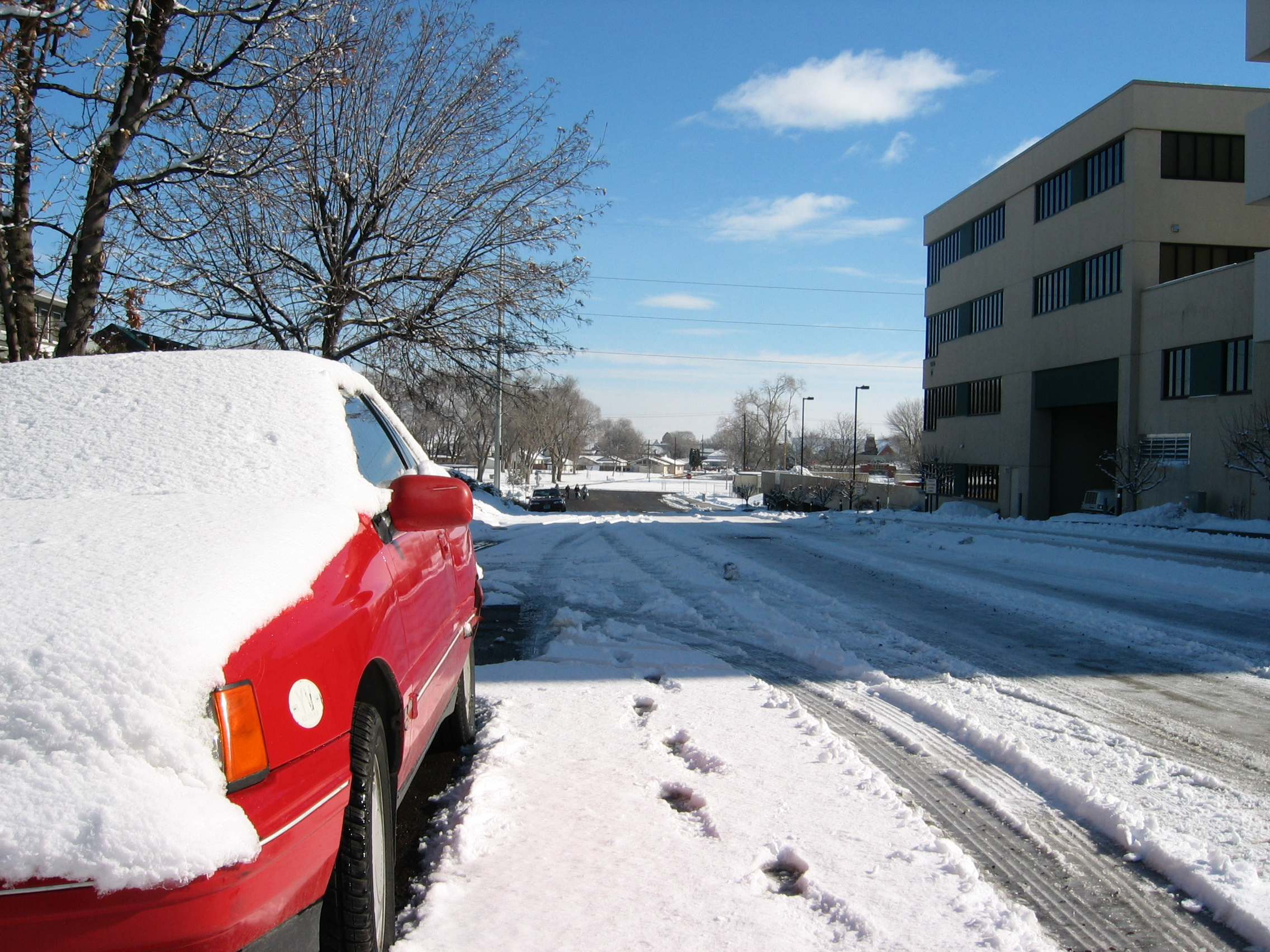
Snow in Ontario

As of the census of 2010, there were 11,366 people, 4,275 households, and 2,678 families living in the city. The population density was 2,198.5 inhabitants per square mile (848.8/km^{2}). There were 4,620 housing units at an average density of 893.6 per square mile (345.0/km^{2}). The racial makeup of the city was 69.5% White, 0.7% African American, 1.3% Native American, 2.2% Asian, 0.1% Pacific Islander, 22.6% from other races, and 3.5% from two or more races. Hispanic or Latino of any race were 41.3% of the population.

There were 4,275 households, of which 35.4% had children under age 18 living with them, 41.3% were married couples living together, 16.0% had a female householder with no husband present, 5.3% had a male householder with no wife present, and 37.4% were non-families. 30.9% of all households were made up of individuals, and 15.3% had someone living alone who was 65 years of age or older. The average household size was 2.60 and the average family size was 3.28 .

The median age in the city was 32.1 years. 28.9% of residents were under age 18; 12.3% were between the ages of 18 and 24; 23% were from 25 to 44; 21% were from 45 to 64; and 14.9% were 65 years of age or older. The gender makeup of the city was 47.3% male and 52.7% female.

=== 2000 census ===
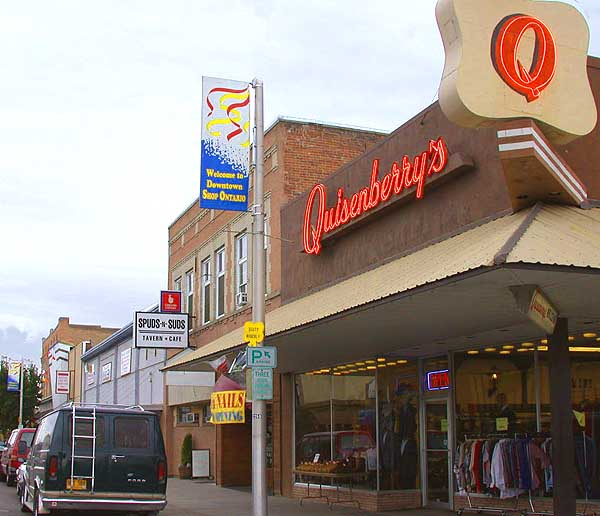
Downtown Ontario

As of the census of 2000, there were 10,985 people, 4,084 households, and 2,634 families living in the city. The population density was 2,459.3 people per square mile (948.8/km^{2}). There were 4,436 housing units at an average density of 993.1 per square mile (383.2/km^{2}). The racial makeup of the city was 69.27% White, 0.55% African American, 2.69% Asian, 0.88% Native American, 0.15% Pacific Islander, 23.09% from other races, and 3.39% from two or more races. Hispanic or Latino of any race were 32.05% of the population.

There were 4,084 households, out of which 35.6% had children under the age of 18 living with them, 47.4% were married couples living together, 13.1% had a female householder with no husband present, and 35.5% were non-families. 30.4% of all households were made up of individuals, and 15.4% had someone living alone who was 65 years of age or older. The average household size was 2.63 and the average family size was 3.30 .

In the city, the population was spread out, with 30.5% under age 18, 11.5% from 18 to 24, 24.0% from 25 to 44, 18.6% from 45 to 64, and 15.4% who were 65 years of age or older. The median age was 31 years. For every 100 females, there were 89.7 males. For every 100 females age 18 and over, there were 85.2 males.

The median income for a household in the city was $29,173, and the median income for a family was $35,625. Males had a median income of $29,775 versus $21,967 for females. The per capita income for the city was $14,683. About 16.4% of families and 20.8% of the population were below the poverty line, including 29.0% of those under age 18 and 14.3% of those age 65 or over.

== Economy ==
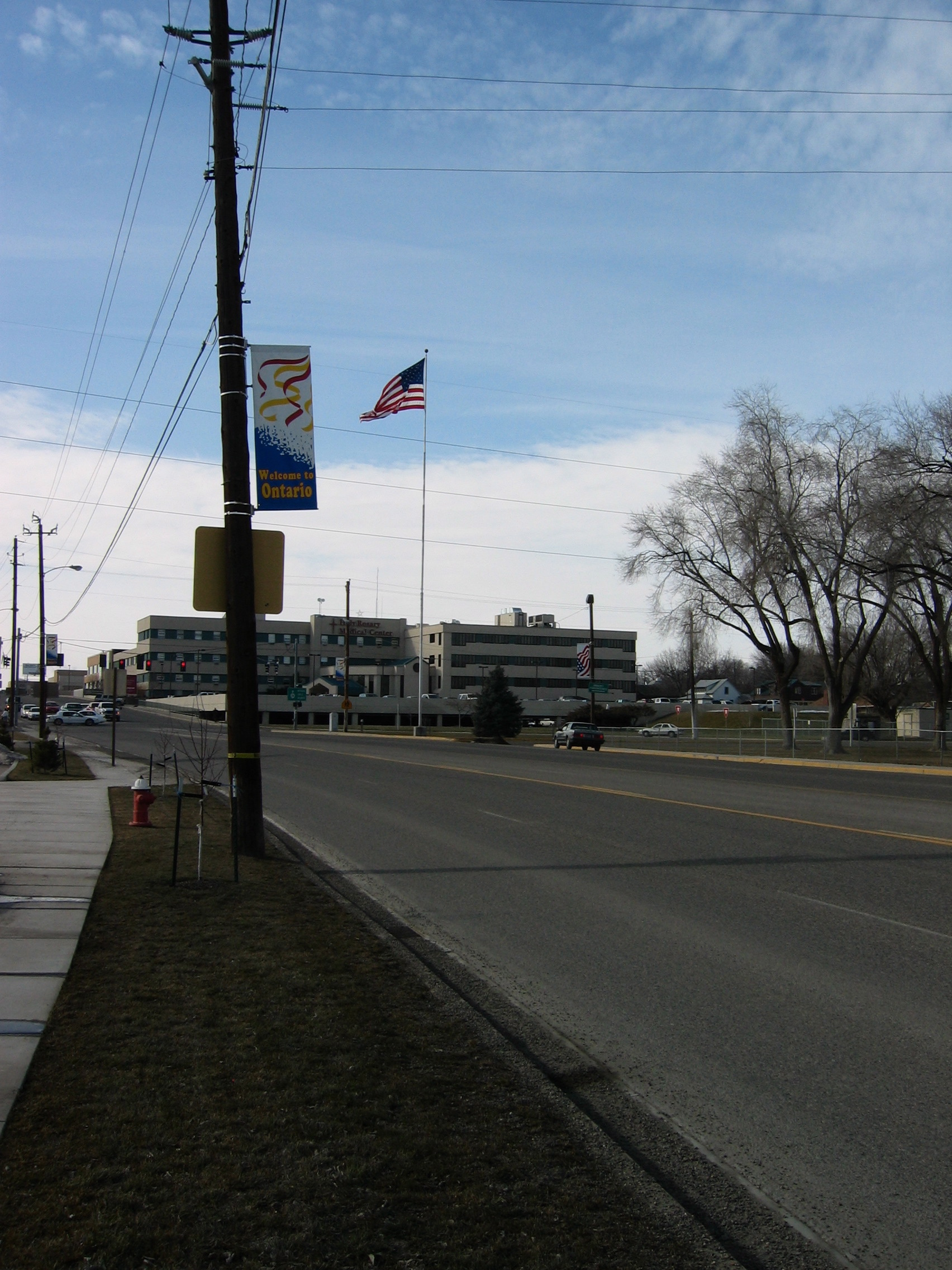
Southwest 4th Avenue overlooking Holy Rosary Medical Center

The Heinz Frozen Food Company (formerly Ore-Ida), a subsidiary of H. J. Heinz Company, processes locally grown potatoes, and annually produces over 600,000,000 pounds (270,000,000 kg) of 75 different potato products, while employing approximately 1,000. Tater tots were first created and manufactured here in 1953 (commercial distribution began in 1956).

About five miles (8 km) northwest of central Ontario is the Snake River Correctional Institution, a 3,000-bed medium security facility. Opened in 1991 and expanded in 1998, the prison has approximately 900 employees.

== Education ==
=== Tertiary education ===
- Treasure Valley Community College

=== K-12 education ===
Ontario is served by the Ontario School District (8C) public schools. Schools include:

- Ontario High School 9-12
- Ontario Middle School 7-8
- Aiken Elementary K-5
- Alameda Elementary K-6
- Cairo Elementary K-5
- May Roberts Elementary K-6
- Pioneer Elementary K-5

There is also a charter school:

- Four Rivers Community School (4RCC) - K-12 - It began operations in 2003.

The Annex School has an Ontario postal address but is away from Ontario, in the community of Annex.

Private schools

- Treasure Valley Christian School Pre K-12
- St. Peter's Catholic School (Roman Catholic Diocese of Baker) K-8

Ontario Community Library of the Ontario Library District is in Ontario.

== Media ==
Ontario's daily paper is the Argus Observer.

== Infrastructure ==
=== Transportation ===
Bus

- Snake River Transit provides public transportation between points in Ontario and nearby Fruitland and Payette.
- Ontario is a stop on the Eastern POINT intercity bus line between Bend and Ontario. It makes one stop per day in each direction.
- Greyhound Lines offers service east and west on I-84 from Ontario.

Air

- Ontario Municipal Airport

Highway

- Interstate 84 - Portland - Boise - Ogden

=== Hospital ===
St. Alphonsus Medical Center is a 49-bed, acute-care hospital, serving Ontario and the surrounding communities in Eastern Oregon and southwestern Idaho; it is part of the hospital system of Saint Alphonsus Regional Medical Center in Boise, Idaho.

== Notable people ==
- Cliff Bentz, congressman (2nd district) and former state senator (District 30)
- Jorge Cervantes, horticulturist, writer, and expert in medical cannabis
- Madeline DeFrees, poet
- Tom Edens, MLB pitcher
- A. J. Feeley, NFL quarterback
- Erik Fisher, World Cup alpine ski racer
- Sally Flynn, also known as Sally Hart, singer on The Lawrence Welk Show
- Charles C. Gossett, governor of Idaho and U.S. senator
- Joel Hardin, Border Patrol agent and mantracker
- Denny Jones, Oregon state representative and rancher
- Randall B. Kester, Oregon judge
- Phyllis McGinley, children's author
- Elmo Smith, newspaper editor, mayor of Ontario and governor of Oregon
- Leland Evan Thomas, WWII pilot killed in action at Guadalcanal
- Dave Wilcox, NFL linebacker

== Sister cities ==
Ontario has one sister city, as designated by Sister Cities International:

- Ōsakasayama, Osaka, Japan

== See also ==
- Oregon Short Line Railroad Depot
