= Jorge Cervantes =

American horticulturist, publisher and writer

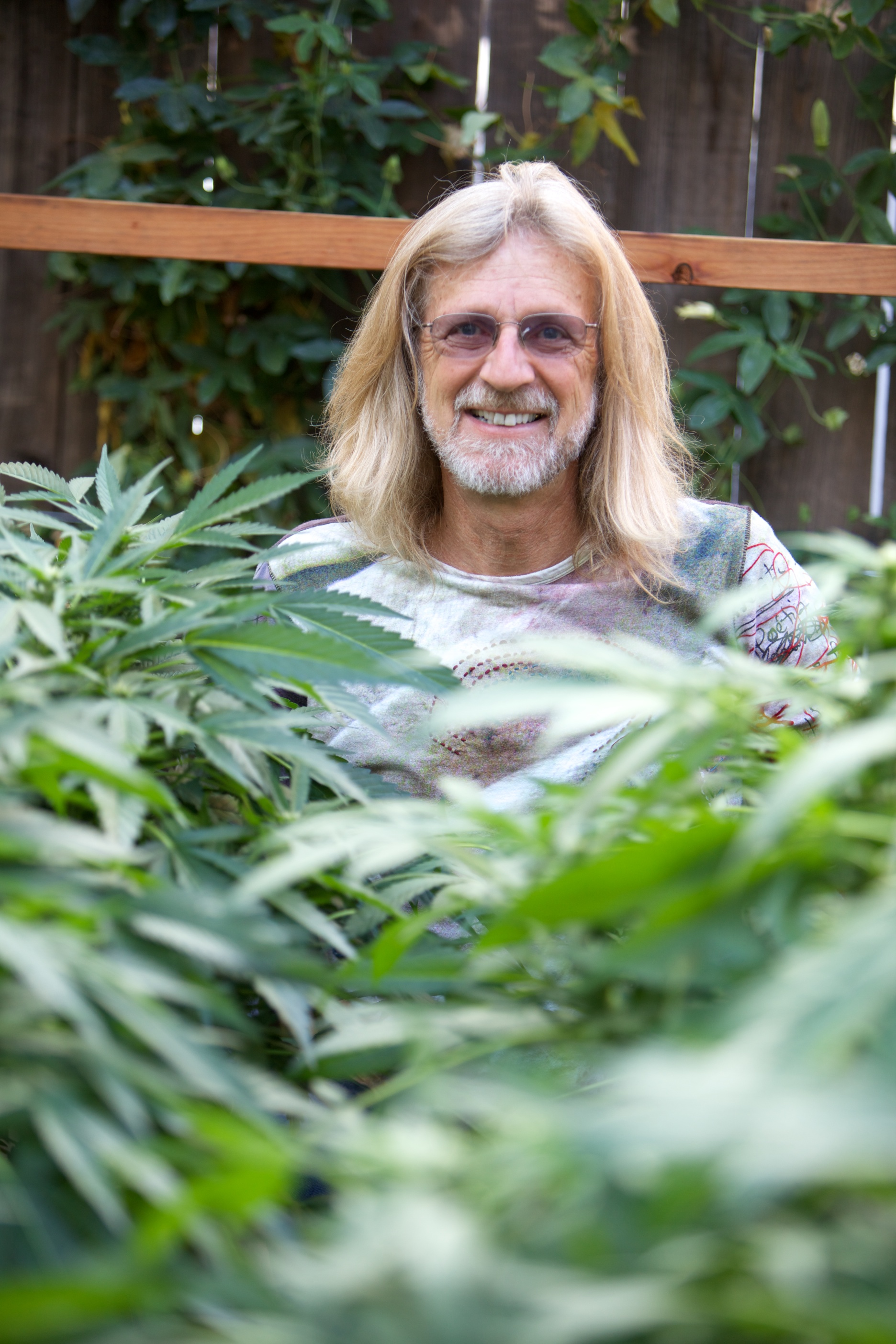

Jorge Cervantes is the pen name of George Van Patten, an American horticulturist, publisher and writer specializing in indoor, outdoor, and greenhouse cultivation of medical cannabis.

His books, articles, photographs and instructional DVDs demonstrate techniques for high-yield closet, basement, backyard, and guerrilla gardens. Cannabis Universities in the USA use his book, Marijuana Horticulture, as the main textbook and his videos as instructional aids. Cervantes wrote a Q & A column (Jorge's Rx) for 10 years and continues to write feature articles in High Times magazine.

== Biography ==
George Van Patten was born in 1953 to Dr. Cecil Robert and Ester Van Patten. He was raised in Ontario, Oregon. As a young boy he delivered the local newspaper. Later he worked in the press room and soon became the photographer for the local newspaper, The Argus Observer, from 1969 - 1973. Van Patten learned about printing, photography, news and publicity at the newspaper.

Van Patten was able to save money from his job at the newspaper to pay for his university studies abroad and in the U.S., first at the University of Valencia in Valencia, Spain, and later at the University of the Américas in Puebla, Mexico. As a university student in Mexico, he developed his lifelong passion for the cannabis plant. In 1976 Van Patten moved to Portland, Oregon, to be close to his parents after his father fell ill. He graduated from Portland State University in 1977.

After graduation, Van Patten moved to Santa Barbara, California where he and a Chilean partner started a landscape garden business. There he grew "sin semilla" (Spanish for 'seedless') marijuana illegally in Los Padres National Forest near Santa Barbara. Sin semilla was the "new" high-quality cannabis that Mexicans reserved for domestic consumption at the time. In 1979 Van Patten and his partner sold the landscape garden business and embarked on a year-long travel excursion with their girlfriends through the heart of Mexico, Central America, and South America.

In 1981, Van Patten married Estella Cervantes in Portland, Oregon. They had no children. He established a landscape garden business in Portland and cultivated cannabis indoors. A lack of credible information about indoor cannabis cultivation led him to analyze, research, and author Indoor Marijuana Horticulture in 1983. The book became a best-seller, and successful indoor growers dubbed it the "Indoor Grower's Bible" which became the book's subtitle. Van Patten developed his own High Intensity Discharge Light Systems for marijuana growing and sold them via retail and mail order through his then Jorge Cervantes' Indoor Garden Store.

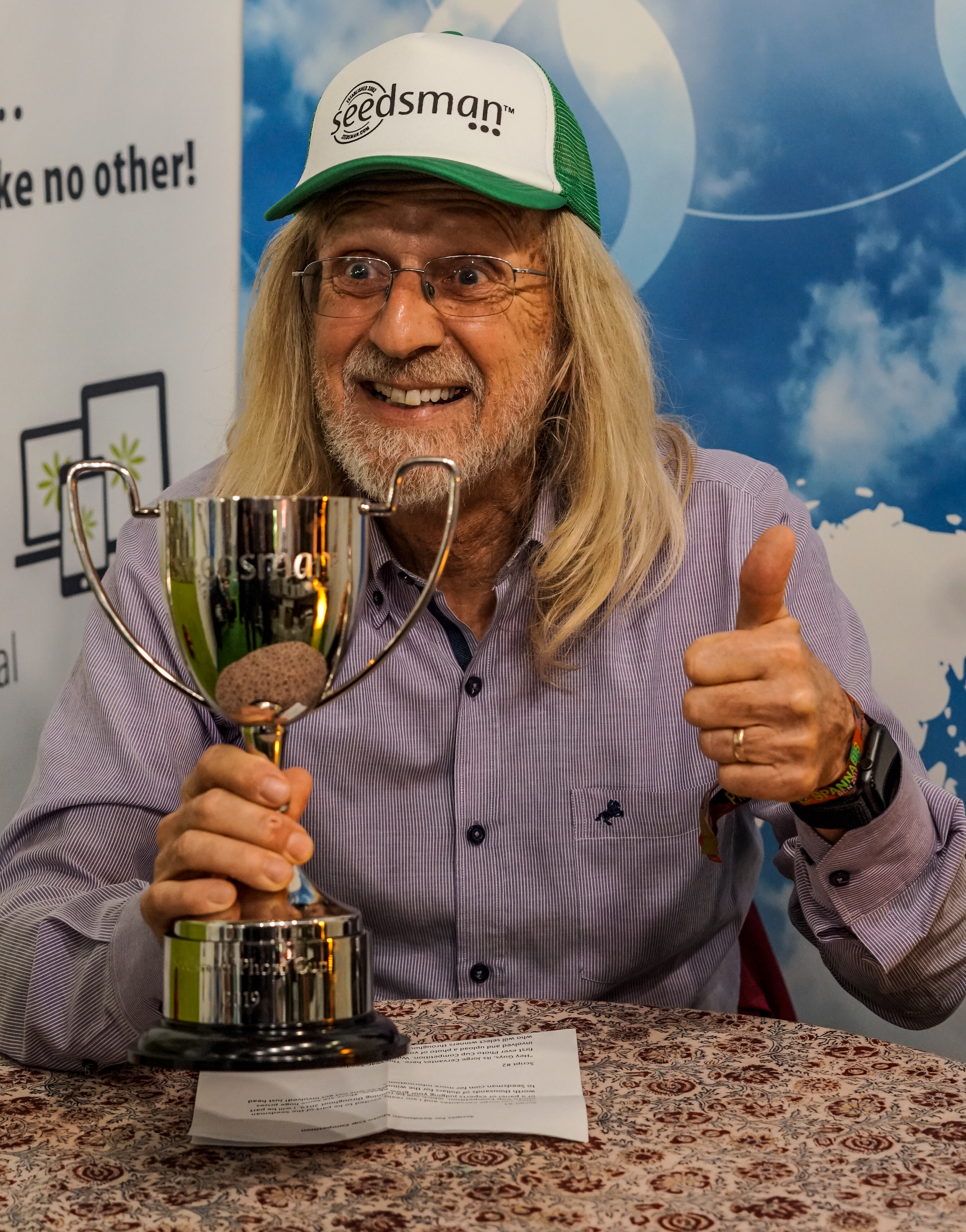
Jorge at Spannabis hosting a Seedsman Seeds competition.

The DEA's Operation Green Merchant (1989) closed down his store and more than 40 others in the U.S.A. After the nationwide investigation, Van Patten reworked Indoor Marijuana Horticulture and republished it as Gardening Indoors with Soil & Hydroponics in 1995 to skirt legal issues.

== Professional career ==
Van Patten founded both Interport USA in 1983 and then Van Patten Publishing in 1998 to self-publish his books. Van Patten printed the first edition of Indoor Marijuana Horticulture (1983) at a local print shop. At night, he rented the lithograph press from the print shop to print the 96-page book. By the fifth edition in 2006 the book had been translated into Dutch, French, German, Italian, Spanish, and Russian editions, and the book took on the subtitle, Marijuana Horticulture: The Indoor/Outdoor Medical Grower's Bible. Today, Cannabis Universities in the USA use it as their main textbook.

== Awards ==
- Benjamin Franklin Gold Award, Independent Book Publishes's Association, April 2016
- Lester Grinspoon Lifetime Achievement Award, High Times, November 2013

== Publications ==
- The Cannabis Encyclopedia: The Definitive Guide to Cultivation & Consumption of Medical Marijuana, ISBN 9781878823342
- Marijuana Horticulture: The Indoor/Outdoor Medical Grower's Bible, ISBN 9781878823236
- Marihuana: horticultura de cannabis - la biblia del cultivador MEDICO de interior y exterior (Spanish), ISBN 9781878823243
- Marijuana Horticulture_Russian Language, ISBN 9781878823359
- Marihuana Drinnen: Alles über den Anbau im Haus (German), ISBN 978-3907080924
- Marihuana Anbaugrundlagen: Der praktische Leitfaden für Cannabisfreunde (German), ISBN 9783037881972
- Marijuana Grow Basics: the Easy Guide for Cannabis Aficionados, ISBN 9781878823373
- Marijuana Indoors: Five Easy Gardens, ISBN 9781878823274
- Marijuana Outdoors:Guerrilla Growing, ISBN 9781878823281
- Marijuana: Jorge's RX, ISBN 9781878823304
- Gardening Indoors with Soil & Hydroponics, 5th Edition, ISBN 9781878823328
- Hydroponic Basics, ISBN 9781878823250
- Gardening Indoors With Rockwool, ISBN 9781878823229
- Gardening Indoors with CO2, ISBN 9781878823199
- Gardening Indoors with Cuttings 9781878823205
- Gardening Indoors with HID Lights, ISBN 9781878823212
