= National Historic Oregon Trail Interpretive Center =

Interpretive center for Oregon Trail history in Oregon

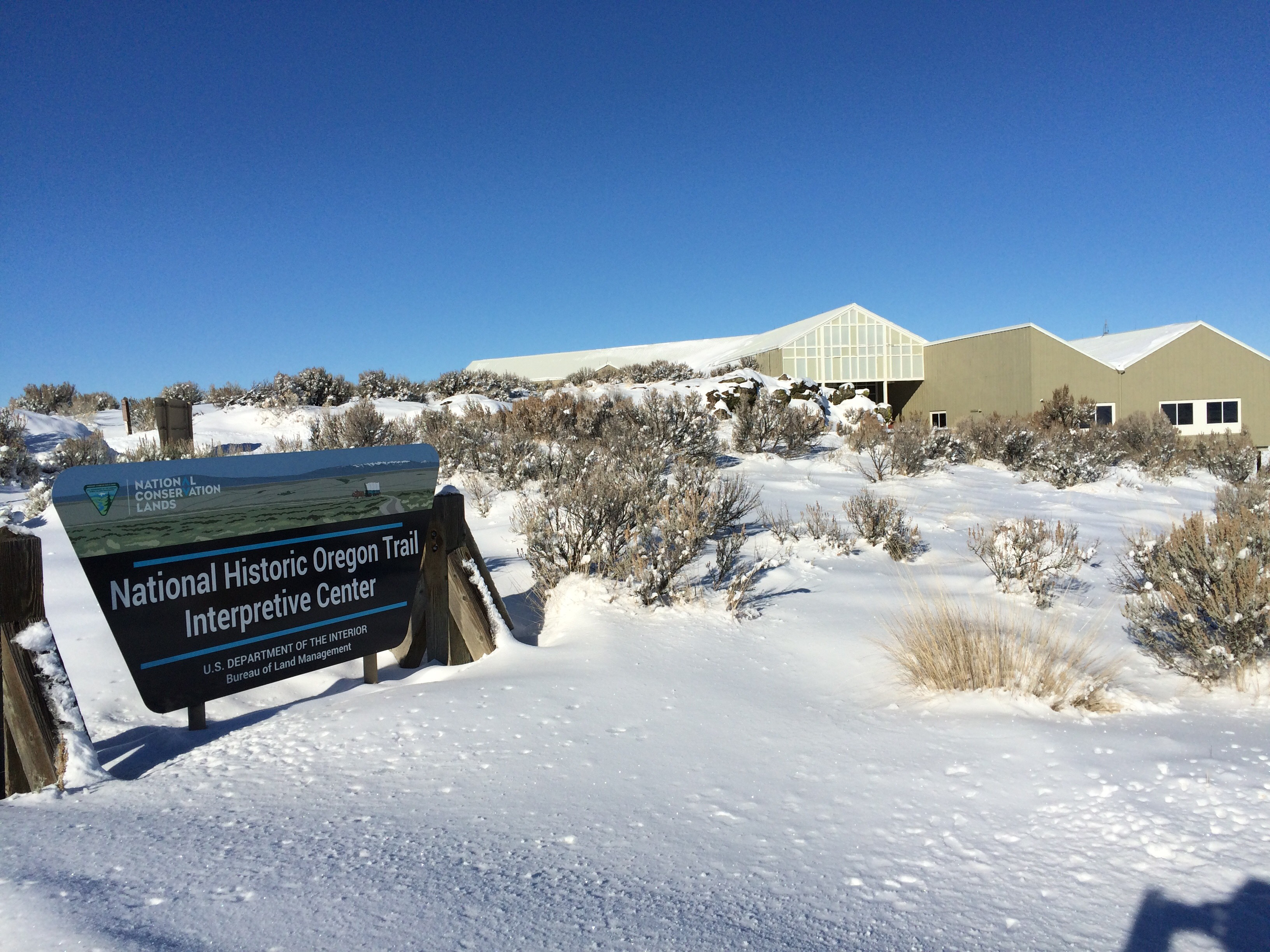
- Established: 1992
- Location: Baker City, Oregon, United States
- Coordinates: 44.814608°N 117.72884°W

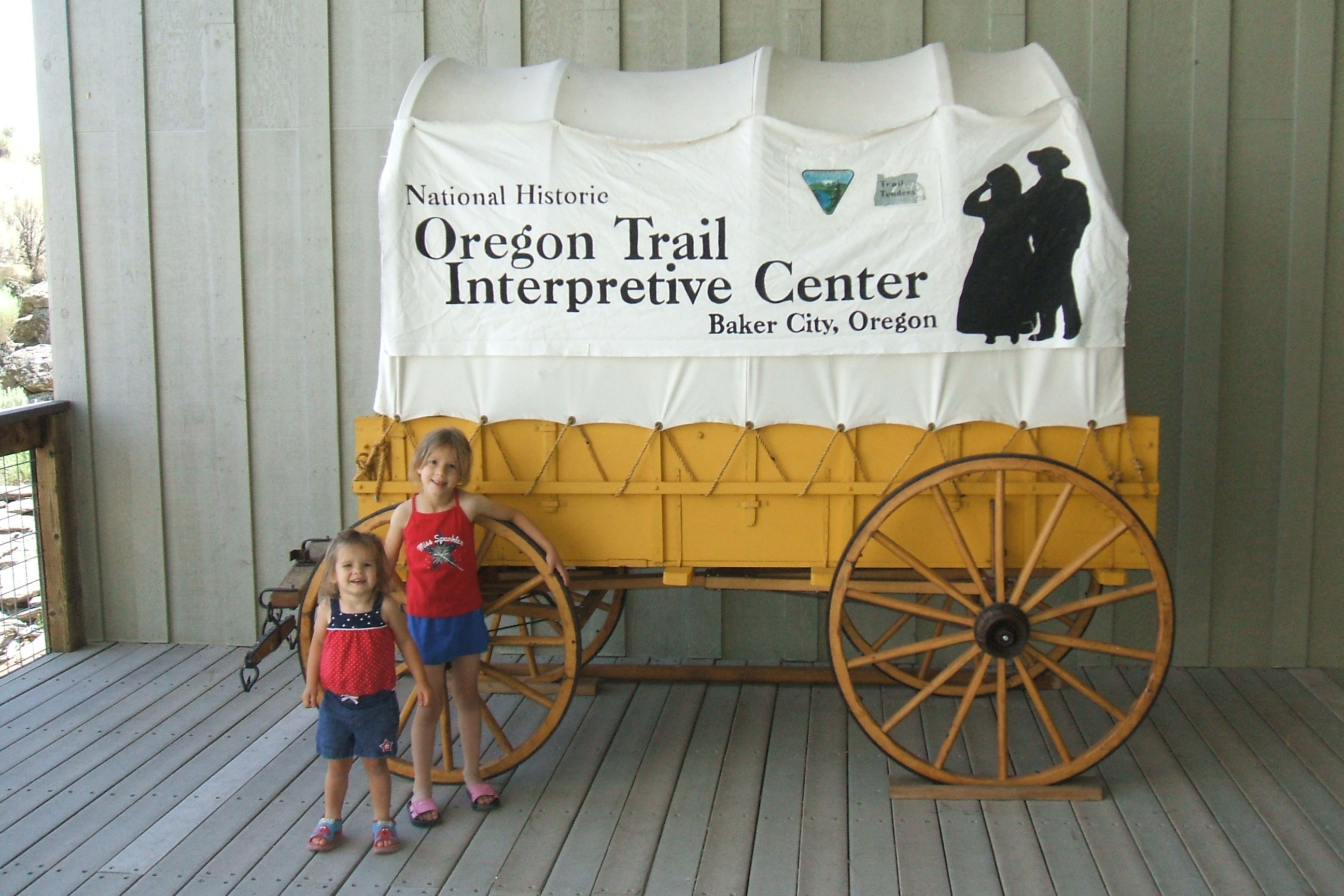
Entrance to the center

The National Historic Oregon Trail Interpretive Center is a 23,000-square-foot (2,100 m^{2}) interpretive center about the Oregon Trail located 6 miles (9.7 km) northeast of Baker City, Oregon on Oregon Route 86 atop Flagstaff Hill. It is operated by the Bureau of Land Management in partnership with Trail Tenders and the Oregon Trail Preservation Trust, and offers living history demonstrations, interpretive programs, exhibits, multi-media presentations, special events, and more than four miles (6 km) of interpretive trails.

Exhibit themes include area natural history, pre-emigrant travelers and explorers, Native Americans, pioneer life, the United States General Land Office and Bureau of Land Management, and the mining and settlement of Northeast Oregon.

== History ==
The book Trail of a Dream by Dorthy Wooters chronicles that dream from the early planning stage in 1987 through funding and construction and, ultimately, opening day in 1992.

=== Key dates ===
- March 1, 2001—The center re-opens to full-time operation after major structural retrofit.
- May, 1992—National Historic Oregon Trail Interpretive Center opens

== See also ==
- National Historic Trails Interpretive Center
