= Leo Adler =

American businessman (1895–1993)

- Born: 1895; Baker City, Oregon
- Died: 1993 (aged 97–98)
- Occupation: Entrepreneur

Leo Adler (1895–1993) was an American entrepreneur and philanthropist. He became well known for running a magazine reshipping business and for giving a lot back to his community.

== Early life and career ==
Leo was born in Baker City, Oregon. From an early age, he began working as he sold magazines using only one paper bag. Alongside with his dog, Prince, he enlarged his business to provide mail order services of magazines and sell more titles.

He established his first office in his father's jewelry and music shop. After high High School, he dropped attending college because his father advised him to pay more attention to his business. At the age of 20, Leo owned a bigger magazine reshaping business with 30 employees. His company continued developing and eventually turned into a seven-state business operating 2,000 outlets that sold more than 3 million magazines annually.

He shared his fortune with the needy people and various local institutions. In 1939, he showed appreciation to the city by purchasing a fire truck for the Fire Department. Furthermore, he donated generously each year to St. Elizabeth Hospital. Baker City Department got several ambulances from him.

Leo was a true baseball fan who attended more than 20 World Series consecutively. He sponsored construction of the baseball field in Baker City. This field was later renamed after him by Governor Mark Hatfield. Moreover, he assisted with development of local sports. He financed various high school, Little League, and Babe Ruth teams. He sponsored installation of the floodlights for sports fields and local rodeo grounds.

Following his death, his fortune was used for creating a scholarship fund that would help students and community fund that would assist local charities and projects
