= National Historic Trails Interpretive Center =

Coordinates: 42.866457°N 106.337413°W

- Established: 2002
- Location: 1501 North Poplar Street; Casper, Wyoming, United States
- Type: Interpretive Center
- Website: Official website

The National Historic Trails Interpretive Center (NHTIC) is an 11,000-square-foot (1,000 m^{2}) interpretive center about several of the National Historic Trails and is located northwest of Casper, Wyoming on Interstate 25. It is operated through a partnership between the Bureau of Land Management, the City of Casper, and the National Historic Trails Center Foundation. The center offers interpretive programs, exhibits, multi-media presentations, and special events. Admission is free. Public Law 119-117, enacted on Sept. 25, 2026, redesignated the center as the "Barbara L. Cubin National Historic Trails Interpretive Center."

== History ==
The idea for an interpretive center in Casper began with the creation of a small trails committee; eventually this committee became the non-profit, National Historic Trails Center Foundation (NHTCF). In 1992 the Bureau of Land Management (BLM) joined with the NHTCF to work on the project, committing to pay half of the $10 million estimated cost. The city of Casper donated 10 acres of land for the center's site.

In 1994, voters in Casper passed the Optional One Cent Tax, which helped fund construction of the center's exhibits. The Wyoming State Legislature also passed a bill to help fund the center that same year. By 1997 plans for the center were complete, and a bill to support construction and operating costs was signed into law by President Bill Clinton.

The groundbreaking for construction took place on June 21, 1999, and the center officially opened August 9, 2002.

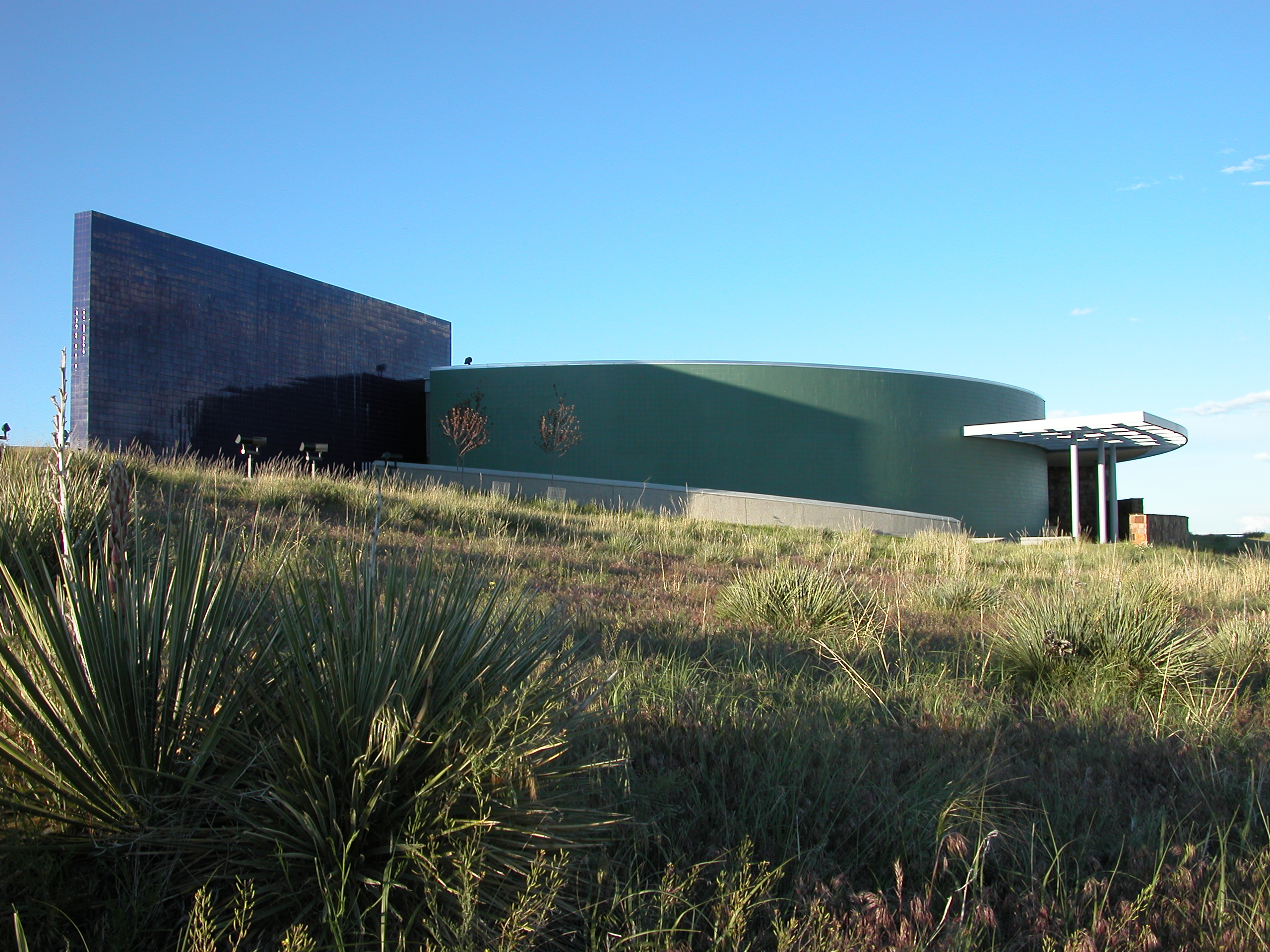
The National Historic Trails Interpretive Center designed by Line and Space Architects sits high above Wyoming's North Platte River, commanding views of major historic trails.

== Exhibits ==
The center contains several permanent exhibits and hosts temporary, traveling, exhibits as well.

Permanent exhibits are on the four trails that run together through Wyoming:

- The Oregon Trail
- The Mormon Pioneer Trail
- The California Trail
- The Pony Express Trail

Entrance to the center is free.

== See also ==
- Mormon Trail Center at Winter Quarters
- National Historic Oregon Trail Interpretive Center
- Oregon-California Trails Association
- List of Registered Historic Places in Wyoming
