= Treasure Valley Christian School =

School in Oregon, US

Location
- 386 North Verde Drive; Ontario, Oregon 97914; United States
- Coordinates: 44°1′53″N 116°59′4″W

Information
- Type: Private Christian
- Motto: Knowledge is an eternal reward
- Established: 1976
- Principal: Fran Renk
- Grades: Pre-K thru 12
- Enrollment: 44 (2009-2010)
- Nickname: Warriors
- Website: TVCS Online

Treasure Valley Christian School (TVCS) is a private pre-K-12 Christian school in Ontario, Oregon, United States. Although it is non-denominational, it is located on the campus of and sponsored by Treasure Valley Baptist Church. TVCS is a member of the Association of Christian Schools International and teaches using A Beka curriculum. On May 31, 2014, TVCS graduated its first graduating class of 2 seniors.

== Demographics ==
The student population at TVCS as of 2009-2010 was approximately 90% white, 7% Hispanic and 2% Asian.
