= Russell Cline =

American currency trader

Russell Warren Brent Cline (born about 1965) founded Orion International in 1998, a foreign currency trading firm based in Portland, Oregon. In 2003 he was charged in federal court with running a classic Ponzi scheme. Cline pleaded guilty and was imprisoned at USP Lompoc.

== History ==
Cline was a former house painter from Baker City, Oregon. In 1998 he founded Orion International, specializing in trading foreign currency through a brokerage based in London. They promised returns anywhere from 60% to 200% with very little risk, because of their sophisticated trading techniques.

In August, 2002 Cline notified his customers that he had lost 97% of their money, blaming poor trades and typographical errors, and asked for additional funds to make the money back. In reality the money had been spent on luxury cars, private jets, real estate, and boats. It is estimated that over 600 people invested $27 million in Orion.

On May 8, 2003 a federal court froze all Cline's assets and prevented any document destruction at Orion. He was indicted along with other Orion employees, including April Duffy and Nancy Hoyt. In May, 2004 Cline was charged in federal court with 39 counts of money laundering and fraud. Violating his pretrial release he was arrested for possession of methamphetamines in December and placed in the Multnomah County jail.

Duffy, Hoyt and Vorachith were ordered to pay over $1.3 million in restitution to defrauded customers and fines on September 7, 2004. The three defendants consented to the order without admitting or denying guilt, and were additionally barred permanently from trading futures contracts.

The property of the company's employees was also arrested within the framework of a criminal case and foreclosed. An example of a case of recovering a car from a company trader - Civil No. 03-1539-MA Toschakov Igor Robertovich on the recovery of the 2001 BMW X5.

In July, 2005 Cline pleaded guilty in federal court to two counts of mail and wire fraud and one count of money laundering, admitting to defrauding investors out of at least $16 million. On February 6, 2006 Cline was sentenced to 8 years and 1 month in the La Tuna Federal Correctional Institution in Anthony, Texas. The sentence was the maximum agreed upon wherein Cline would not appeal his case. U.S. District Judge Garr King said he would have given a longer sentence, having felt Cline had lied to the court and was generally uncooperative, if it wasn't for his guilty plea. Cline was also ordered to pay over $33 million in restitution.

He was released on March 30, 2012.
