= Baker City Municipal Airport =

Airport in Oregon, United States

- IATA: BKE; ICAO: KBKE; FAA LID: BKE

Summary
- Airport type: Public
- Owner: Baker City
- Serves: Baker City, Oregon
- Elevation AMSL: 3,373 ft (1,028 m)
- Coordinates: 44°50′14″N 117°48′33″W
- Website: www.BakerCity.com/...

Map
- Location within Oregon

Runways
Direction	Length		Surface
Direction	ft	m	Surface
13/31	5,085	1,550	Asphalt
17/35	4,359	1,329	Asphalt
8/26	3,670	1,119	Asphalt

Statistics (2019)
- Aircraft operations (year ending 9/15/2019): 16,200
- Based aircraft: 43
- Source: Federal Aviation Administration

Baker City Municipal Airport (IATA: BKE, ICAO: KBKE, FAA LID: BKE) is three miles north of Baker City, in Baker County, Oregon, United States. The National Plan of Integrated Airport Systems for 2011–2015 categorized it as a general aviation facility.

The first airline flights were Empire Airlines Boeing 247Ds in late 1946; successors West Coast, Air West and Hughes Airwest served Baker until 1973.

== Facilities ==
The airport covers 398 acres (161 ha) at an elevation of 3,373 feet (1,028 m). It has three asphalt runways: 13/31 is 5,085 by 100 feet (1,550 x 30 m); 17/35 is 4,359 by 75 feet (1,329 x 23 m); 8/26 is 3,670 by 140 feet (1,119 x 43 m).

In the year ending September 15, 2019, the airport had 16,200 aircraft operations, average 44 per day: 78% general aviation, 22% air taxi, and <1% military. 43 aircraft were then based at the airport: 34 single-engine, 3 multi-engine, 1 jet, and 5 helicopter.
