= Joel Hardin =

American man tracker

- Born: c. 1940
- Occupations: Tracker, author
- Employer(s): Idaho Air National Guard, United States Border Patrol
- Known for: Human tracking expert
- Website: Hardin

Joel Hardin (c. 1940) is an American expert man tracker and author. He has worked for the Idaho Air National Guard and the United States Border Patrol before launching his own tracking company.

== Early life ==
Hardin was born in 1939 or 1940. He became a border patrol officer in 1965 and was stationed in El Cajon, California.

== Career ==
Hardin, after joining the United States Border Patrol, started working at the U.S.-Mexico and U.S.-Canadian borders. During his time on the U.S.-Mexico border, he learned tracking from fellow agents. He began tracking illegal immigrants who cross into the United States on foot. In 1972, he was sent to Bellingham, Washington where he worked in an office.

In 1974, he began to develop an advanced-tracking training program. He retired from the border patrol in 1990 and started a company providing training services based on the work he had been doing while employer.

During his career, Hardin tracked serial killer Gary Ridgway and the escaped Soviet spy prisoner Christopher Boyce. In 1982, while he was still a border patrol agent, the United States Forest Service reached out to Hardin asking him to examine alleged Bigfoot tracks found near the Mill Creek Municipal Watershed in Walla Walla, Washington. Hardin determined that an animal did not make the tracks. In 1989, he was part of the search team in Whatcom County, Washington assisting with the search for missing teen Mandy Stavik.

Law enforcement officials occasionally hire Hardin to track suspects. In 1998, he helped police in Washington track a criminal who had broken into 75 buildings. He determined the criminal's favorite trails and police installed sensors accordingly, which led to the capture of a suspect.

Since his retirement from the Border Patrol, Hardin is the owner & operator of Oregon Company Universal Tracking Services. The company undertakes and trains clients in human tracking. He is referred to as an expert tracker and he travels through the United States training other trackers.

== Books ==
- Tracker: Case Files & Adventures of a Professional Mantracker by Joel Hardin with Matt Condon, 2004, ISBN 0-9753460-0-8
