= Burns Municipal Airport =

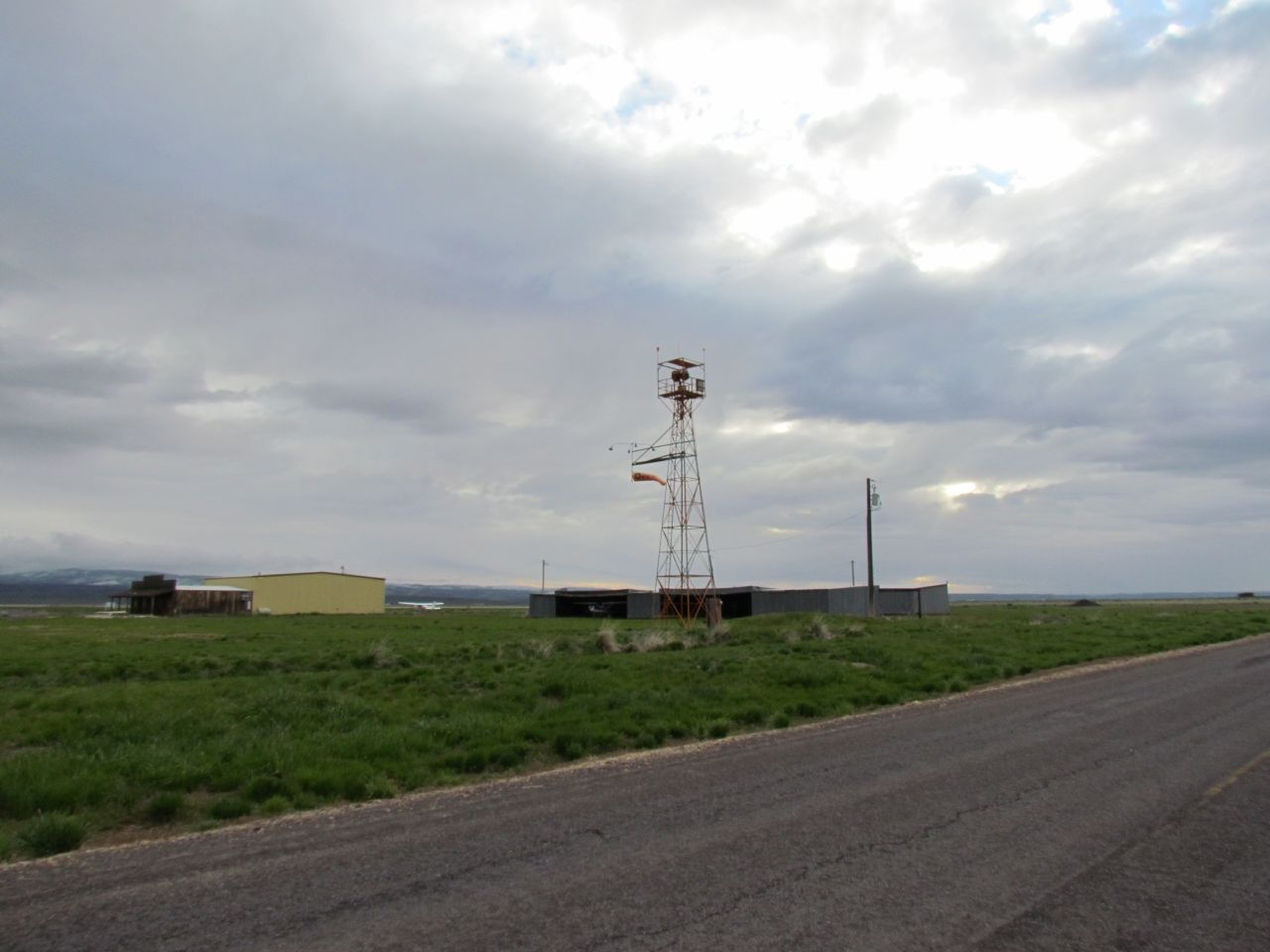
- IATA: BNO; ICAO: KBNO; FAA LID: BNO

Summary
- Airport type: Public
- Owner: City of Burns
- Serves: Burns, Oregon
- Elevation AMSL: 4,148 ft (1,264 m)
- Coordinates: 43°35′31″N 118°57′20″W
- Website: www.bno.aero

Map
- Location within Oregon

Runways
Direction	Length		Surface
Direction	ft	m	Surface
12/30	5,101	1,555	Concrete
3/21	4,600	1,402	Concrete

Statistics (2018)
- Aircraft operations (year ending 9/10/2018): 8,000
- Based aircraft: 13
- Source: Federal Aviation Administration

Burns Municipal Airport (IATA: BNO, ICAO: KBNO, FAA LID: BNO) is 6 miles (9.7 km) east of Burns, in Harney County, Oregon. The National Plan of Integrated Airport Systems for 2011–2015 categorized it as a general aviation facility.

== History ==
By 1929 an airport had been established at Burns. In 1934, the Civil Works Administration awarded $5,000 to build a new airport. In 1942, the City of Burns purchased 680 acres (280 ha) for a new airport. The new airport was built by the Civil Aeronautics Administration at a cost of $570,000, which had two runways of 5,200 feet (1,600 m). During World War II, a squadron of P-38 Lightning were stationed at the Burns Airport.

West Coast DC-3s landed at Burns from 1959 until early 1967.

== Accidents and incidents ==
- On January 7, 1981, three Bonneville Power Administration employees died when their airplane crashed as it approached the airport.

== Facilities ==
Burns Municipal Airport covers 825 acres (334 ha) at an elevation of 4,148 feet (1,264 m). It has two runways: 12/30 is 5,101 by 75 feet (1,555 x 23 m) concrete; 3/21 is 4,600 by 60 feet (1,402 x 18 m) concrete. The United States Bureau of Land Management operates a SEAT Base from the airport for fighting wildfires.

In the year ending September 10, 2018, the airport had 8,000 aircraft operations, average 22 per day: 84% general aviation, 15% air taxi, and 1% military. 13 aircraft were then based at the airport: all single-engine.

The airport is home to the Burns Interagency Fire Zone (BIFZ), fire aviation base, supporting initial attack helicopters and single engine air tankers (SEATS).
