= Ontario Municipal Airport =

Airport in Ontario, Oregon, US

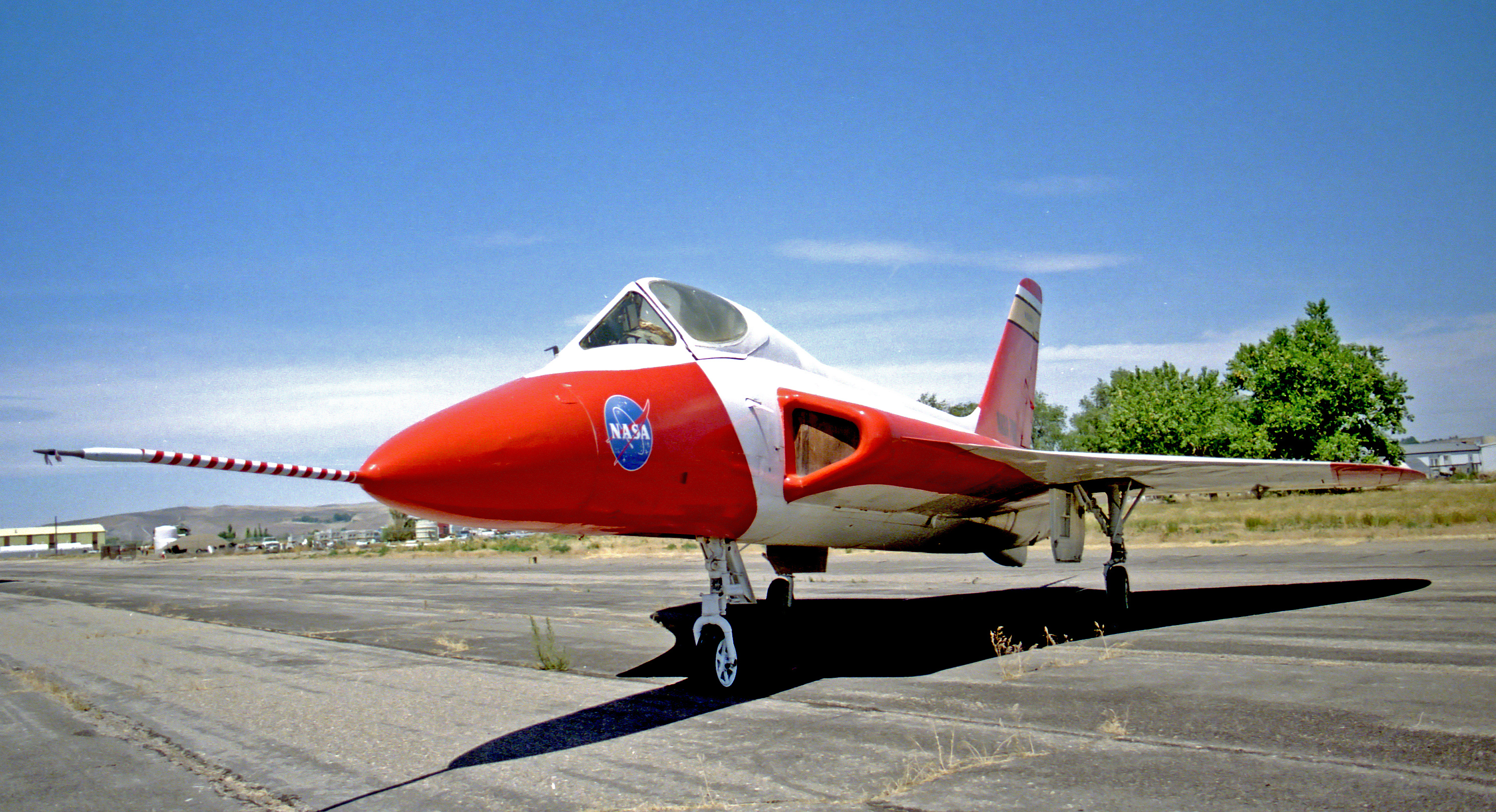
- Douglas F5D Skylancer at the airport
- IATA: ONO; ICAO: KONO; FAA LID: ONO

Summary
- Airport type: Public
- Owner: City of Ontario
- Serves: Ontario, Oregon
- Elevation AMSL: 2,193 ft / 668 m
- Coordinates: 44°01′10″N 117°00′47″W

Map

Runways
Direction	Length		Surface
Direction	ft	m	Surface
15/33	5,006	1,526	Asphalt

Statistics (2019)
- Aircraft operations (year ending 9/18/2019): 12,930
- Based aircraft: 61
- Source: Federal Aviation Administration

Ontario Municipal Airport (IATA: ONO, ICAO: KONO, FAA LID: ONO) is three miles west of Ontario, in Malheur County, Oregon. The National Plan of Integrated Airport Systems for 2011–2015 categorized it as a general aviation facility.

The first airline flights were Empire Airlines Boeing 247Ds in late 1946; successors West Coast, Air West and Hughes Airwest served Ontario until 1973.

== Facilities ==
The airport covers 480 acres (194 ha) at an elevation of 2,193 feet (668 m). Its one runway, 15/33, is 5,006 by 100 feet (1,526 x 30 m) asphalt.

In the year ending September 18, 2019, the airport had 12,930 general aviation aircraft operations, average 35 per day. 61 aircraft were then based at the airport: 55 single-engine, 2 jet, 1 helicopter, and 3 glider.
