= Baker City, Oregon =

City in Oregon, U.S.

- City
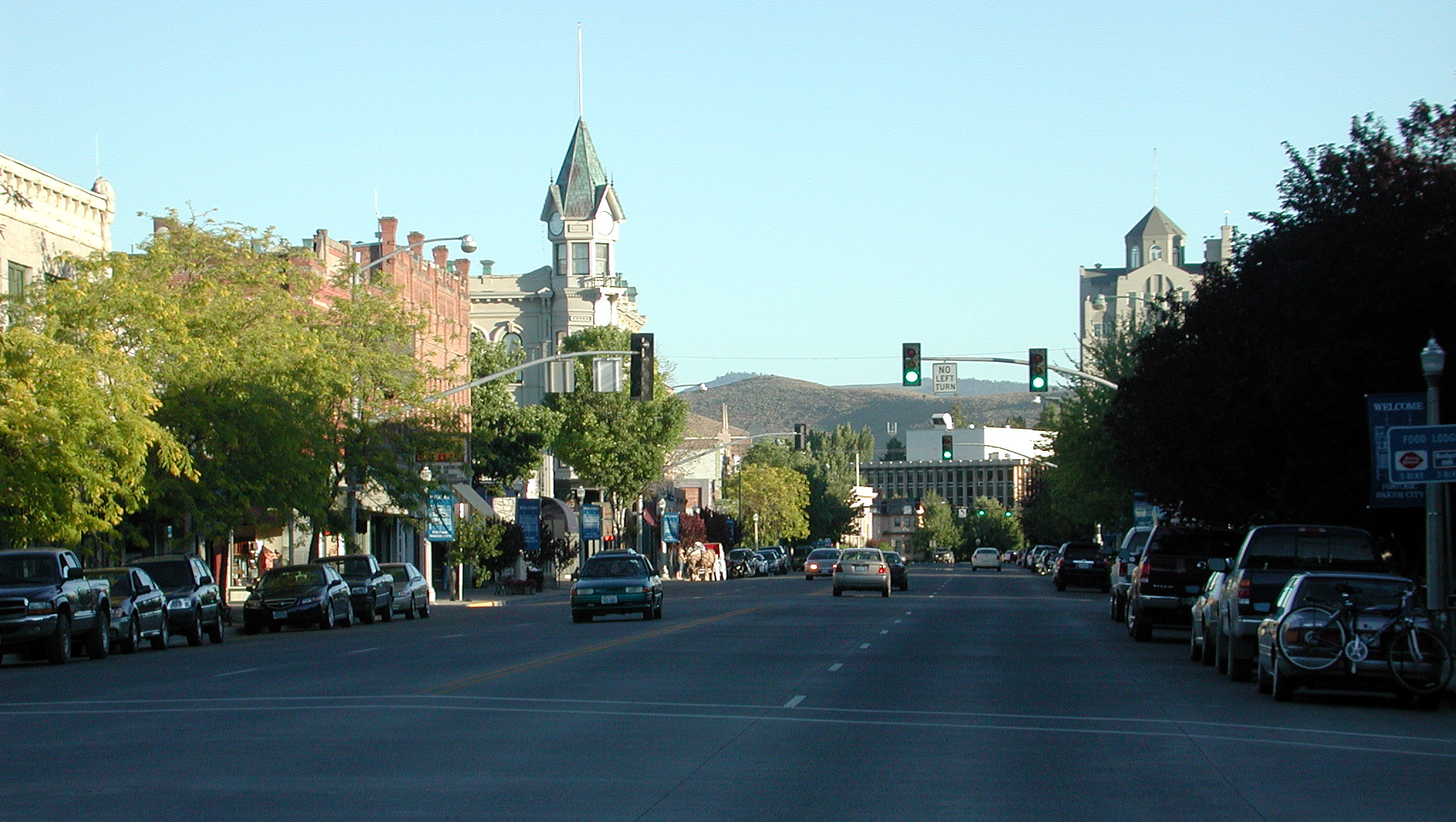
- Main Street

- Seal
- Motto: "On the Historic Oregon Trail."
- Location in Oregon

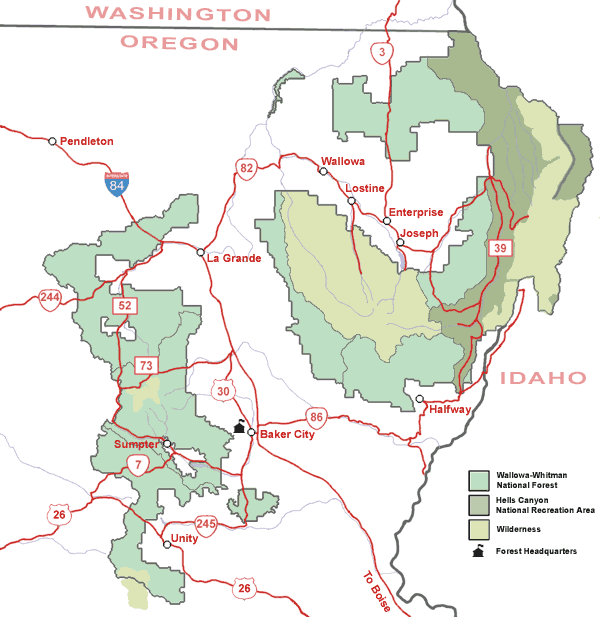
- Baker City along I-84 in Oregon, surrounded by sections of Wallowa–Whitman National Forest

- Location in Oregon Baker City (the United States) Baker City (North America)
- Coordinates: 44°46′30″N 117°49′55″W
- Country: United States
- State: Oregon
- County: Baker
- Platted: 1865
- Incorporated: 1874

Government
  - Mayor: Randy Daugherty

Area
  - Total: 7.16 sq mi (18.55 km^{2})
  - Land: 7.16 sq mi (18.55 km^{2})
  - Water: 0 sq mi (0.00 km^{2})
- Elevation: 3,451 ft (1,052 m)

Population (2020)
  - Total: 10,099
  - Density: 1,410/sq mi (544.4/km^{2})
- Time zone: UTC−08:00 (Pacific)
  - Summer (DST): UTC−07:00 (Pacific)
- ZIP Code: 97814
- Area code: 541
- FIPS code: 41-03650
- GNIS feature ID: 2409773
- Website: www.bakercity.com

Baker City is a city in and the county seat of Baker County, Oregon, United States. It was named after Edward Dickinson Baker, the only U.S. Senator ever killed in military combat. The population was 10,099 at the time of the 2020 census.

== History ==
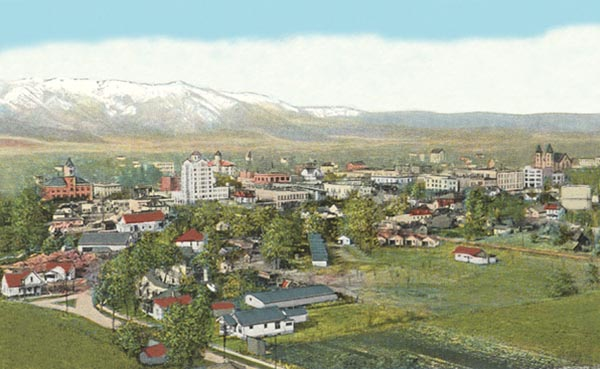
Aerial view c. 1929

Platted in 1865, Baker City grew slowly in the beginning. A post office was established on March 27, 1866, but Baker City was not incorporated until 1874. Even so, it supplanted Auburn as the county seat in 1868. The city and county were named in honor of U.S. Senator Edward D. Baker, the only sitting senator to be killed in a military engagement. He died in 1861 while leading a failed charge of 1,700 Union Army soldiers up a ridge at Ball's Bluff, Virginia, during the American Civil War.

The Oregon Short Line Railroad came to Baker City in 1884, prompting growth; by 1900 it was the largest city between Salt Lake City and Portland and a trading center for a broad region. In 1910, Baker City residents voted to shorten the name of the city to simply Baker, the name change becoming official in 1911; another vote in 1989 restored the name to Baker City.

The establishment of the Oregon Lumber Company by Charles W. Nibley, the creation of a lumber mill by David Eccles on the North Powder River, and the purchase of sugar beet farms led to the migration of Latter-day Saint families to the Baker area. The first branch in Oregon was created in Baker City on July 23, 1893.

The Roman Catholic Diocese of Baker was established on June 19, 1903, after which the Saint Francis de Sales Cathedral was built in Baker City. In 1918, Baker was the subject of national interest when the 1918 solar eclipse took place and the U.S. Naval Observatory based its observations there. The path of totality of the solar eclipse of August 21, 2017, included Baker City as well.

One of its former councilors, Adam Nilsson, who also served for the Baker City Public Arts Commission, was charged with criminal mischief for graffiti on August 1, 2017, while holding office. A police officer made connections through the tag "Provolotus", which has been found in other graffiti complaints as well as on Nilsson's Instagram profile. The graffiti was on a Baker County-owned property when Nilsson and his friend Ashley E. Schroder were cited. Nilsson, who has pled guilty to spray painting graffiti at the Lime plant, contends his constitutional rights were violated and has filed a $1.3 million lawsuit against Baker County and the county sheriff in August 2019. In this lawsuit, Nilsson wrote that he was negotiating with the artist, whose moniker is "Thrashbird" to obtain art as "public art" for Baker City. By September 27, 2023, all claims by Nilsson were dismissed.

In spring 2023, the city council voted to remove mayor Beverly Calder as a result of an op-ed piece she had written in the Baker City Herald. She retained her seat on the city council but mayoralship was given to Matt Diaz. Diaz resigned in July, following a controversial anti-LGBTQ+ meme, claiming he was moving out of town. The city council reinstated Calder as the city's mayor.

Beginning in August additional city councilors began resigning their posts, culminating in the entire city council, including Calder, resigning leaving all positions vacant. Before resigning, the three remaining city councilors in September made an attempt to appoint new people to fill the vacancies but they were not able to satisfy quorum requirements, after which they resigned in an attempt to force a special election but Oregon state law requires the vacancies to be filled by the county commissioners.

== Government ==
Baker City's city council consists of seven councilors who are elected by the residents of the city. The councilors select one of their members to serve as mayor for a two-year term.

== Geography ==
According to the United States Census Bureau, the city has a total land area of 7.16 square miles (18.54 km^{2}).

The city is situated in a valley between the Wallowa Mountains to the east and the Elkhorn Mountains, part of the Blue Mountains to the west, with the Powder River running through the center of downtown on its way to the Snake River.

== Climate ==
Baker City has a cool semi-arid climate (Köppen BSk), with a large diurnal temperature variation most of the year, peaking at 39.3 °F (21.8 °C) in August. July is generally the warmest month, with a normal mean temperature of 65.1 °F (18.4 °C). The highest recorded temperature, 109 °F (43 °C), occurred on August 10, 2018, and August 2, 2024. December is the coldest month, with a normal mean temperature of 28.6 °F (−1.9 °C). On December 23, 1983, the temperature fell to −34 °F (−36.7 °C), the lowest recorded in the city. May is typically the month of highest precipitation, averaging 1.46 inches (37 mm). Snowfall averages about 27.3 inches (69 cm) a year.

Climate data for Baker City Municipal Airport, Oregon (1991–2020 normals, (Note: Mean monthly maxima and minima (i.e. the expected highest and lowest temperature readings at any point during the year or given month) calculated based on data at said location from 1991 to 2020.) extremes 1928–present (Note: Snowfall measurements have been discontinued at Baker City Airport since September 2001.))
Month	Jan	Feb	Mar	Apr	May	Jun	Jul	Aug	Sep	Oct	Nov	Dec	Year
Record high °F (°C)	61 (16)	66 (19)	78 (26)	89 (32)	94 (34)	103 (39)	105 (41)	109 (43)	102 (39)	90 (32)	72 (22)	60 (16)	109 (43)
Mean maximum °F (°C)	47.2 (8.4)	54.0 (12.2)	66.9 (19.4)	76.5 (24.7)	85.1 (29.5)	91.4 (33.0)	98.5 (36.9)	98.2 (36.8)	92.4 (33.6)	79.6 (26.4)	61.6 (16.4)	49.7 (9.8)	99.9 (37.7)
Mean daily maximum °F (°C)	37.6 (3.1)	43.9 (6.6)	53.8 (12.1)	60.7 (15.9)	69.6 (20.9)	76.8 (24.9)	88.2 (31.2)	88.2 (31.2)	78.8 (26.0)	63.7 (17.6)	47.6 (8.7)	37.4 (3.0)	62.2 (16.8)
Daily mean °F (°C)	28.8 (−1.8)	33.5 (0.8)	40.8 (4.9)	45.9 (7.7)	54.2 (12.3)	60.6 (15.9)	68.5 (20.3)	67.7 (19.8)	59.1 (15.1)	47.1 (8.4)	36.2 (2.3)	28.6 (−1.9)	47.6 (8.7)
Mean daily minimum °F (°C)	20.0 (−6.7)	23.2 (−4.9)	27.8 (−2.3)	31.0 (−0.6)	38.8 (3.8)	44.3 (6.8)	48.9 (9.4)	47.3 (8.5)	39.3 (4.1)	30.4 (−0.9)	24.8 (−4.0)	19.7 (−6.8)	33.0 (0.5)
Mean minimum °F (°C)	−1.4 (−18.6)	5.4 (−14.8)	14.5 (−9.7)	17.8 (−7.9)	23.0 (−5.0)	32.0 (0.0)	37.4 (3.0)	35.5 (1.9)	25.7 (−3.5)	15.0 (−9.4)	6.4 (−14.2)	−1.3 (−18.5)	−7.9 (−22.2)
Record low °F (°C)	−30 (−34)	−28 (−33)	−5 (−21)	7 (−14)	15 (−9)	26 (−3)	30 (−1)	27 (−3)	17 (−8)	2 (−17)	−16 (−27)	−34 (−37)	−34 (−37)
Average precipitation inches (mm)	0.70 (18)	0.59 (15)	0.77 (20)	0.82 (21)	1.46 (37)	1.10 (28)	0.55 (14)	0.43 (11)	0.44 (11)	0.62 (16)	0.73 (19)	0.85 (22)	9.06 (232)
Average snowfall inches (cm)	7.3 (19)	4.8 (12)	2.7 (6.9)	1.0 (2.5)	0.1 (0.25)	0.0 (0.0)	0.0 (0.0)	0.0 (0.0)	0.0 (0.0)	0.1 (0.25)	4.0 (10)	7.3 (19)	27.3 (69.9)
Average precipitation days (≥ 0.01 in)	10.5	8.5	10.2	9.7	10.3	8.1	3.6	3.1	3.6	6.4	9.1	10.6	93.7
Average snowy days (≥ 0.1 in)	7.8	5.7	3.5	2.3	0.3	0.0	0.0	0.0	0.0	0.4	5.0	8.4	33.4
Source 1: NOAA (snow/snow days 1981–2010)
Source 2: National Weather Service

== Demographics ==
Historical population
Census	Pop.	Note	%±
1870	312		—
1880	1,258		303.2%
1890	2,604		107.0%
1900	6,663		155.9%
1910	6,742		1.2%
1920	7,729		14.6%
1930	7,858		1.7%
1940	9,342		18.9%
1950	9,471		1.4%
1960	9,986		5.4%
1970	9,354		−6.3%
1980	9,471		1.3%
1990	9,140		−3.5%
2000	9,860		7.9%
2010	9,828		−0.3%
2020	10,099		2.8%
Sources: U.S. Decennial Census

=== 2020 census ===
As of the 2020 census, Baker City had a population of 10,099. The median age was 43.6 years. 20.2% of residents were under the age of 18 and 23.4% of residents were 65 years of age or older. For every 100 females there were 103.0 males, and for every 100 females age 18 and over there were 101.7 males age 18 and over.

96.5% of residents lived in urban areas, while 3.5% lived in rural areas.

There were 4,321 households in Baker City, of which 24.7% had children under the age of 18 living in them. Of all households, 42.1% were married-couple households, 20.2% were households with a male householder and no spouse or partner present, and 29.5% were households with a female householder and no spouse or partner present. About 35.1% of all households were made up of individuals and 19.0% had someone living alone who was 65 years of age or older.

There were 4,656 housing units, of which 7.2% were vacant. Among occupied housing units, 64.2% were owner-occupied and 35.8% were renter-occupied. The homeowner vacancy rate was 1.5% and the rental vacancy rate was 6.2%.

Racial composition as of the 2020 census
Race	Number	Percent
White	8,971	88.8%
Black or African American	66	0.7%
American Indian and Alaska Native	116	1.1%
Asian	61	0.6%
Native Hawaiian and Other Pacific Islander	13	0.1%
Some other race	239	2.4%
Two or more races	633	6.3%
Hispanic or Latino (of any race)	531	5.3%

=== 2010 census ===
As of the census of 2010, there were 9,828 people, 4,212 households, and 2,529 families residing in the city. The population density was 1,372.1 inhabitants per square mile (529.8/km^{2}). There were 4,653 housing units at an average density of 674.3 units per square mile (260.3 units/km^{2}). The racial makeup of the city was 94.57% White, 1.12% Native American, 0.53% Asian, 0.44% African American, 0.01% Pacific Islander, 0.97% from other races, and 2.35% from two or more races. Hispanic or Latino of any race were 3.52% of the population.

There were 4,212 households, of which 24.5% had children under the age of 18 living with them, 45.1.2% were married couples living together, 10.5% had a female householder with no husband present, and 40.0% were non-families. 33.8% of all households were made up of individuals, and 16.8% had someone living alone who was 65 years of age or older. The average household size was 2.25 and the average family size was 2.85. In the city, the population was 23.7% under the age of 19, 5.0% from 20 to 24, 23.0% from 25 to 44, 27.8% from 45 to 64, and 20.5% who were 65 years of age or older. The median age was 44 years. For every 100 females, there were 98.9 males. For every 100 females age 18 and over, there were 98.6 males. In 2005, the median income for a household in the city was $29,020, and the median income for a family was $34,790. Males had a median income of $26,638 versus $20,313 for females. The per capita income for the city was $14,179. About 10.7% of families and 16.5% of the population were below the poverty line, including 19.1% of those under age 18 and 14.9% of those age 65 or over.

== Arts and culture ==
=== Annual events ===
Baker City hosts many annual festivals, including the Miners' Jubilee on the third weekend of July, which celebrates the mining history of the area and the filming of the 1969 Lee Marvin and Clint Eastwood musical comedy Paint Your Wagon in the city. The Miners' Jubilee was originally launched in 1934 as the Baker Mining Jubilee, but lapsed after 1941 because of World War II and a declining interest in mining. The event was revived by Richard and Marge Haynes in 1975. The couple organized the celebration for two years before handing it over to the Baker County Chamber of Commerce.

=== Museums and other points of interest ===
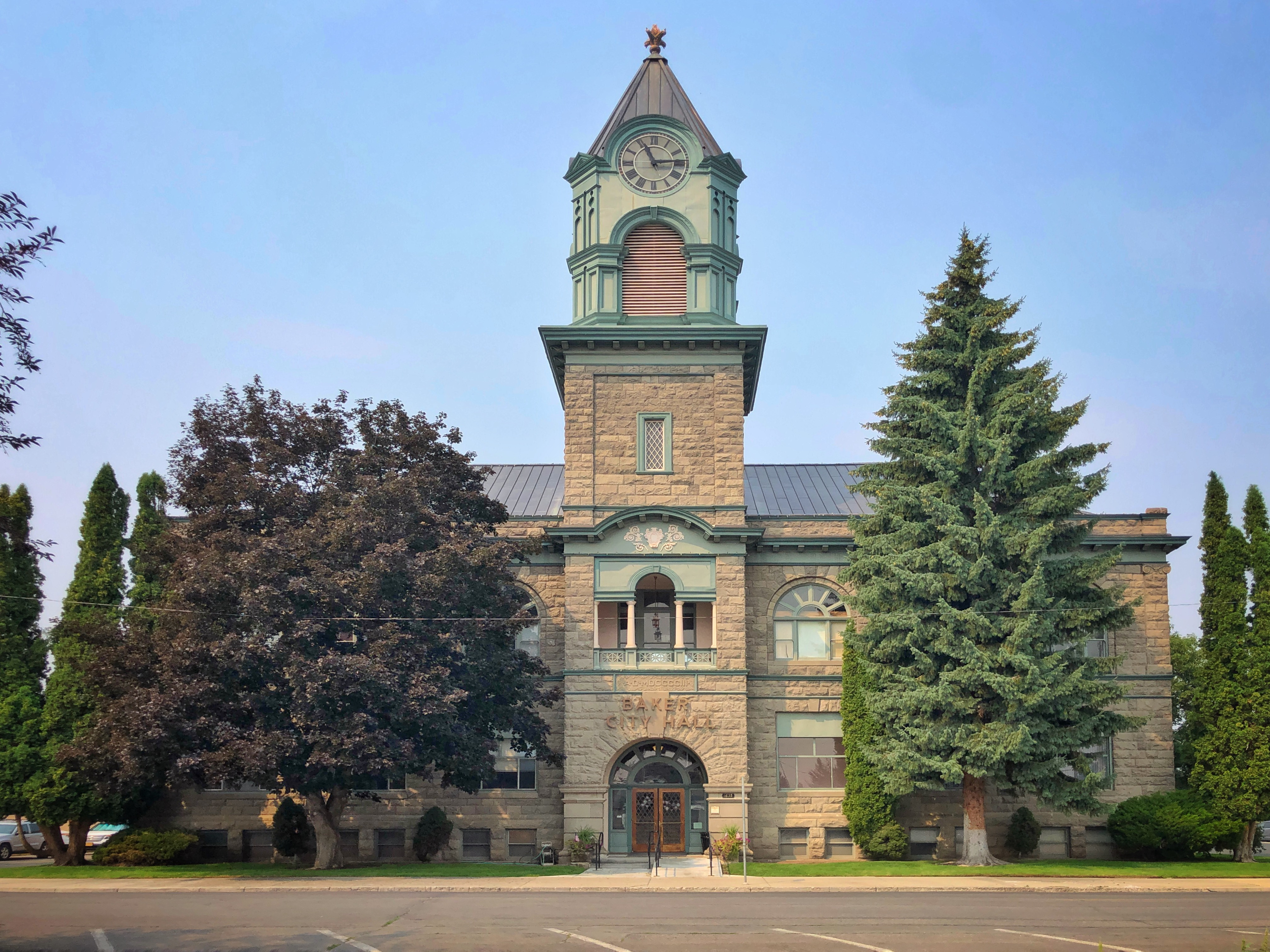
Baker City Hall

The Baker Historic District, on the National Register of Historic Places, is located on about 42 acres (17 ha) centered on Main Street in downtown Baker City. Within its boundaries are more than 130 properties, about half of which include structures built between the late 1880s and about 1915. Many of these as well as others built as early as 1870 are two-story masonry commercial buildings. The city hall, county courthouse, the former post office, former library, former social clubs, a Roman Catholic cathedral, and an Episcopal Church are among notable buildings within the district.

Baker City Tower, a nine-story structure in the historic district, is the tallest building east of the Cascade Range in Oregon. Opening in 1929 as the Baker Community Hotel, it was converted to other uses in 1970. The concrete Art Deco structure features terracotta eagles at each ground-floor entrance and is topped by an octagonal observation center with an eight-sided hip roof and a flagpole.

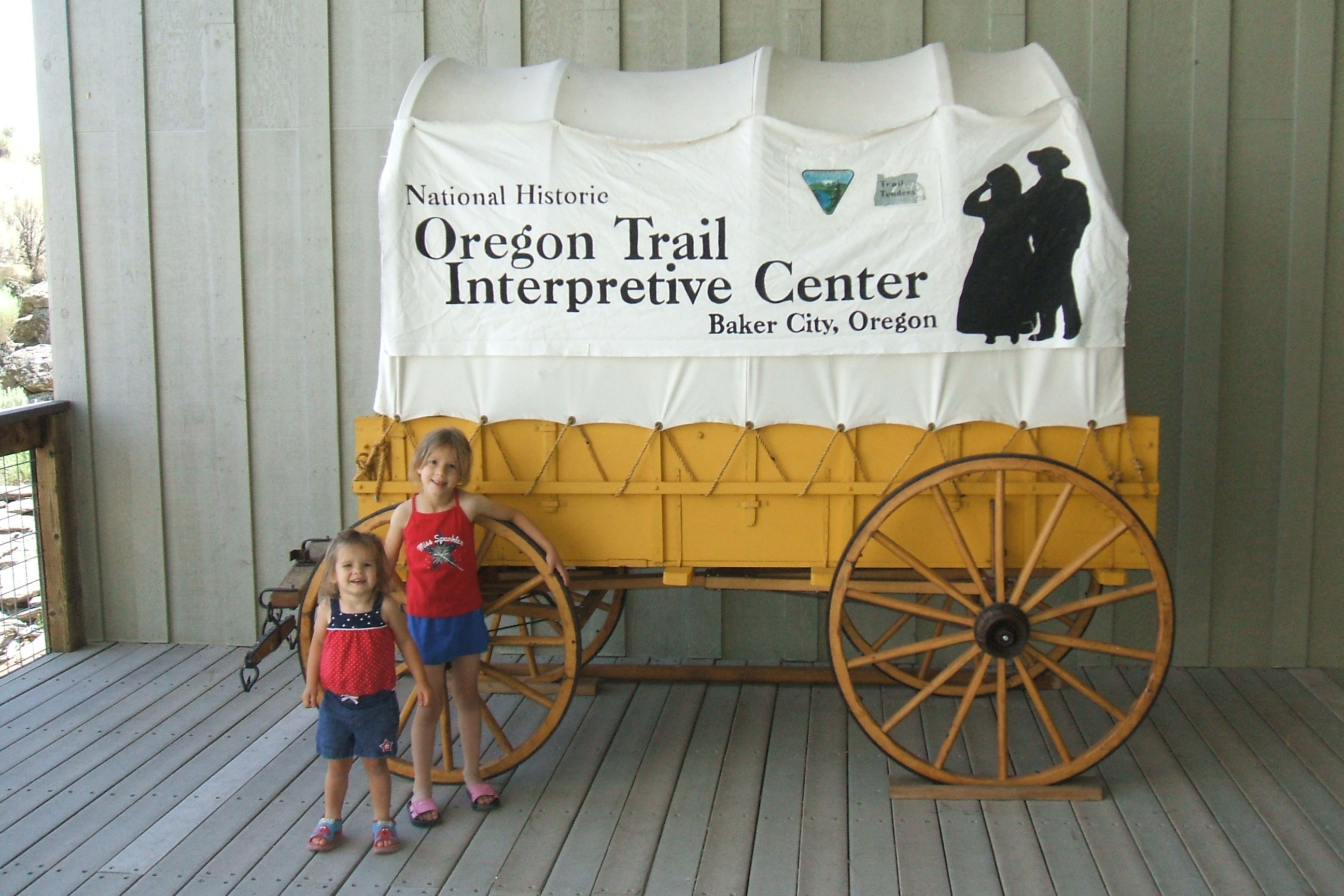
Baker City is home to the National Historic Oregon Trail Interpretive Center.

Also in the historic district is the Geiser Grand Hotel, a three-story, stucco-clad, brick structure that at the time of its opening in 1889 had plate glass windows, electric lights, baths, an elevator, and a dining room that seated 200. Originally called the Washauer Hotel, it became the Geiser Grand in about 1895 after its purchase by the John Geiser family, which had large mining investments in Baker County and elsewhere.

Baker Heritage Museum, previously the Oregon Trail Regional Museum, is housed in the Natatorium built in 1920 on Grove street across from the city park. The exhibits interpret the history of the region including mining, ranching, timber, early Baker City life, Chinese culture, and wildlife. The Adler House Museum, the former home of Leo Adler is now the Baker Heritage Museum's largest artifact. Learn the story of Leo Adler, Baker City philanthropist who donated millions to the people of Baker County in his will. The Adler house has been restored to his original splendor with original furnishings and interiors.

The National Historic Oregon Trail Interpretive Center, about 5 miles (8.0 km) east of the city, offers exhibits, theater performances, workshops, and other events and activities related to the Oregon Trail, the ruts of which pass through the center's 500-acre (200 ha) site. Established in 1992, the site is managed by the federal Bureau of Land Management and Trail Tenders, a group of volunteers.

Other points of interest in Baker City include the Crossroads Art Center, in a former Carnegie library; the downtown U.S. Bank, featuring a gold display that includes the Armstrong Nugget, weighing 80.4 ounces (2.28 kg); the Eltrym, Baker City's only movie theater, housed in a single-story structure built in the late 1940s.

== Sports and recreation ==
The Baker City Cycling Classic is a set of bicycle races held in Baker City and the surrounding region. Similar bicycle races, the Elkhorn Classic, were based in Baker City through 2011. The city hosts the Oregon School Activities Association Class 1A girls and boys basketball tournaments at Baker High School in March. The Oregon East−West Shrine Game (high school football) is held here in July. The Hell's Canyon Motorcycle Rally is also held in Baker City, in July.

Sections of the Wallowa–Whitman National Forest are to the west and to the northeast of Baker City, which serves as the forest headquarters. Possible forest activities include hiking, biking, winter sports, fishing, hunting, mineral prospecting, camping, wildlife viewing, and other forms of recreation.

== Transportation ==
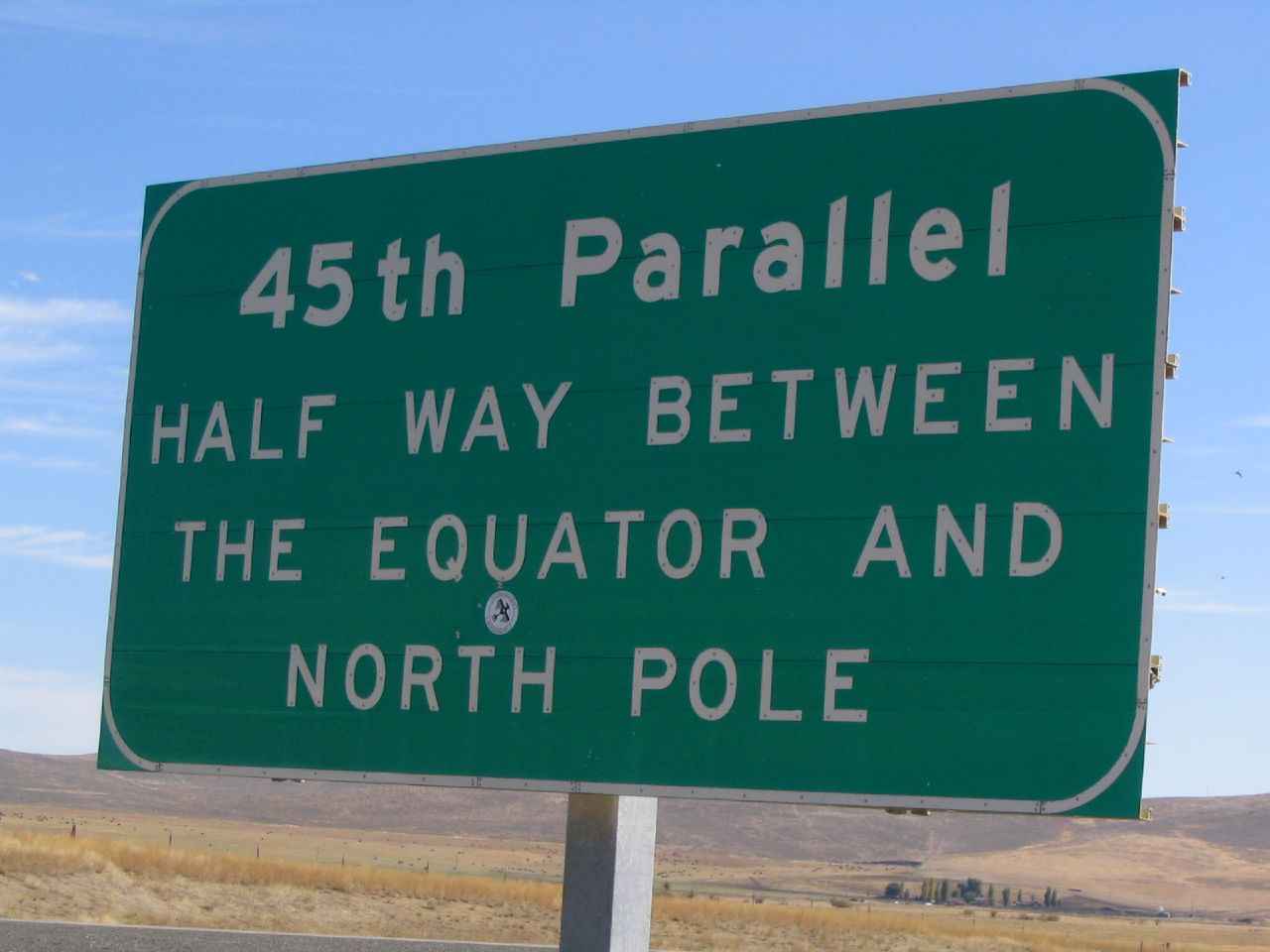
The 45th Parallel sign near Baker City, on Interstate 84

Interstate 84 (I-84) runs along the eastern edge of Baker City, while U.S. Route 30 passes through its downtown. Oregon Route 7 runs between I-84 in Baker City and Sumpter and Austin to the west. Oregon Route 86 heads north and east past the National Historic Oregon Trail Interpretive Center and on to the cities of Richland and Halfway.

The city owns and operates the 398-acre (161 ha) Baker City Municipal Airport, located about 3 miles (5 km) north of downtown in rural Baker County. Northeast Oregon Public Transit provides hourly trolley service around Baker City, as well as twice daily bus service to La Grande, on weekdays.

Baker City is served by the Union Pacific Railroad (UP), originally the Oregon Railway and Navigation Company (OR&N). In 1887, the UP acquired a long-term lease on the OR&N, which connected to existing UP track and the Oregon Short Line at Huntington. The UP provides freight service but not passenger service to Baker City. Between 1977 and 1997 the city was a regular stop along the former route of Amtrak's Pioneer between Chicago, Salt Lake City, Boise, Portland, and Seattle.

A bus service connecting between Boise, Idaho and Portland, Oregon with a stop in Baker City was discontinued by Greyhound Lines in January 2025, however the daily bus service with the same stops was restored with a Federal Transit Administration grant in December 2025 through another private contractor.

== Schools and libraries ==
Baker City is served by Baker School District 5J. It includes Baker High School, Eagle Cap Innovative Jr/Sr High School Baker Middle School, Brooklyn Primary, and South Baker Intermediate as well as Keating Elementary and Haines Elementary in rural Baker County. Serving about 1,800 students, 5J is the largest of three school districts in Baker County.

Baker Middle School was designed by Ellis F. Lawrence and completed in 1917. It is constructed from local tuff in a stripped classical style. As of 2011 the building was unoccupied and was on the Most Endangered Places in Oregon list of the Historic Preservation League of Oregon.

The main branch of the Baker County Library system is in downtown Baker City. The other branches are in Haines, Huntington, Halfway, Richland, and Sumpter.

== Media ==
Baker City has one newspaper: the Baker City Herald, published on Monday, Wednesday and Friday. It has five radio stations: KBKR (1490 AM); KBKR-FM (95.3 FM); KWRL (102.3 FM); KCMB (104.7 FM); and KANL (90.7 FM).

== Television ==
KATU ABC Portland, Oregon

- K44AJ Channel 44 Baker City

KOIN CBS Portland, Oregon

- K42AI Channel 42 Baker City

KTVB NBC Boise, Idaho

- K46AM Channel 46 Baker City

KTVB NBC Boise, Idaho

- K18KI Channel 18 Baker Valley

KGW NBC Portland, Oregon

- K36NP-D Channel 36 Baker Valley

KPTV FOX Portland, Oregon

- K40AJ-D Channel 40 Baker City

KTVR PBS Lagrande, Oregon

- K20IV Channel 20 Baker City

== Sister city ==
In 1996, Baker City established a sister city relationship with Zeya, Russia. In that same year, Baker School District 5J agreed to support development of a student exchange program between the two communities.

== Notable people ==
- Leo Adler (1895–1993), businessman
- Montgomery Atwater, writer
- Lee Bollinger (born 1946), attorney and educator
- Wally Byam (1896–1962), inventor
- Charles Howard Carter (1927–1990), historian and academic
- Earle A. Chiles (1904–1982), president of Fred Meyer
- Russell Cline, currency trader
- Elden Francis Curtiss, prelate of the Roman Catholic Church
- Myron Ebell, climate change skeptic
- Caroline Duby Glassman, judge
- Elmer E. Hall, U.S. Marine Corps general
- William Hanna (1910–2001), animator and co-founder of Hanna-Barbera
- Martin Mason Hazeltine, photographer
- John Noble Holcomb (1946–1968), U.S. Army soldier
- Charles A. Johns, judge
- Judy Kennedy (1944–2018), politician and businesswoman
- Ann Kiessling, reproductive biologist
- Louis Macloon (1893–1979), theatrical producer
- Chuck Mawhinney (1949–2024), U.S. Marine
- Lewis Linn McArthur, judge
- Claude C. McColloch, judge
- Bobb McKittrick (1935–2000), American football player and coach
- Kerry McQuisten, politician and businesswoman
- Jenny Mowe (born 1978), basketball player
- William Packwood (1832–1917), politician and U.S. Army veteran
- Mark Payne, make-up artist, filmmaker, and writer
- John L. Rand (1861–1942), politician and jurist
- Jennifer Diane Reitz (born 1959), writer and game designer
- Edward V. Robertson (1881–1963), politician
- Joe Rudi (born 1946), baseball player
- William Smith, politician
- William Stack (1882–1949), actor
- Sally Stanford (1903–1982), madam, businesswoman, and politician
- Howard J. Stoddard (1901–1971), banker
- William H. Strayer, attorney and politician
- William Tebeau (1925–2013), engineer and first African-American man to graduate from Oregon State University
- Herbert Titus (1937–2021), attorney, writer, and politician
- Al Ullman (1914–1986), politician
- Voris, sculptor
