= Oregon Route 414 =

State highway in Baker County, Oregon, US

Oregon Route 414
- Route 414 highlighted in red

Route information
- Maintained by ODOT
- Length: 0.91 mi (1,460 m)
- Existed: 2003–present

Major junctions
- West end: OR 86S / OR 413 in Halfway
- East end: OR 86 near Halfway

Location
- Country: United States
- State: Oregon
- County: Baker

Highway system
- Oregon Highways; Interstate; US; State; Named; Scenic
← OR 413	→ OR 422

Oregon Route 414 (OR 414) is an Oregon state highway running from OR 86S and OR 413 in Halfway to OR 86 near Halfway. OR 414 is known as the Pine Creek Highway No. 414 (see Oregon highways and routes). It is 0.91 miles (1.46 km) long and runs east–west, entirely within Baker County.

OR 414 was established in 2003 as part of Oregon's project to assign route numbers to highways that previously were not assigned, and, as of July 2017, was unsigned.

== Route description ==
OR 414 begins at an intersection with OR 86S and OR 413 in Halfway heads east to an intersection with OR 86 approximately 3/4 mile east of the city limits, where it ends.

== History ==
OR 414 was assigned to the Pine Creek Highway in 2003.

== Major intersections ==
The entire route is in Baker County.

Location	mi	km	Destinations	Notes
Halfway	0.00	0.00	OR 86S south / OR 413 north – Baker City, Richland, Carson, Cornucopia	
	0.91	1.46	OR 86 – Oxbow, Hells Canyon, Richland, Baker City	
1.000 mi = 1.609 km; 1.000 km = 0.621 mi
