= Oregon Route 413 =

State highway in Baker County, Oregon, US

Oregon Route 413
- Route 413 highlighted in red

Route information
- Maintained by ODOT
- Length: 11.45 mi (18.43 km)
- Existed: 2003–present

Major junctions
- South end: OR 414 and OR 86 Spur in Halfway
- North end: Cornucopia Trail in Cornucopia

Location
- Country: United States
- State: Oregon
- County: Baker

Highway system
- Oregon Highways; Interstate; US; State; Named; Scenic
← OR 410	→ OR 414

Oregon Route 413 (OR 413) is an Oregon state highway running from Cornucopia to Halfway. OR 413 is known as the Halfway-Cornucopia Highway No. 413 (see Oregon highways and routes). It is 11.45 miles (18.43 km) long and runs northwest to southeast, entirely within Baker County.

OR 413 was established in 2003 as part of Oregon's project to assign route numbers to highways that previously were not assigned, and, as of July 2017, was unsigned.

== Route description ==
OR 413 begins at Elk Creek in Cornucopia and heads southeast through Carson and Jimtown to Halfway, where it ends at an intersection with OR 414 and OR 86 Spur. Its northernmost 6 miles (9.7 km) are unpaved and narrow, and is closed by snow in the winter.

== History ==
The Halfway-Cornucopia Highway was established in 1935 with the division of the old Baker-Cornucopia Highway into the Baker-Halfway Highway No. 12 and the Halfway-Cornucopia Highway. OR 413 was assigned to the Halfway-Cornucopia Highway in 2003.

== Major intersections ==
The entire route is in Baker County.

Location	mi	km	Destinations	Notes
Cornucopia	0.00	0.00		
Halfway	11.45	18.43	OR 414 / OR 86S – Richland, Baker City, Oxbow, Hells Canyon Dam	
1.000 mi = 1.609 km; 1.000 km = 0.621 mi
