= Kopelman =

Kopelman is a Jewish surname. Notable people with the surname include:

- Arie L. Kopelman (1938–2024), American businessman
- Aviya Kopelman (born 1978), Israeli composer and pianist
- Dan Kopelman, American actor
- Irene Kopelman (born 1974), Argentine-Dutch artist
- Josh Kopelman, American entrepreneur and venture capitalist
- Leon Kopelman (1924–2021), Warsaw Ghetto Uprising fighter and survivor
- Michael Kopelman (born 1950), British researcher
- Mikhail Kopelman (born 1947), Russian-American violinist
- Peter Kopelman (1951–2021), British academic
- Raoul Kopelman (1933–2023), Austrian-born American scientist
- Richard Kopelman, American academic
- Solomon Kopelman (1880–1944), Russian publisher

== See also ==
- Koppelman
