= Cornucopia (disambiguation) =

A cornucopia is a horn or horn-shaped basket and symbol of abundance. It may also refer to:

== Places ==
- Cornucopia (Middletown, Delaware), listed on the National Register of Historic Places in New Castle County, Delaware
- Cornucopia, Oregon
- Cornucopia Peak, a mountain in Oregon
- Cornucopia, Wisconsin
- Cornucopia, fictional country in The Ickabog by JK Rowling

== Arts, entertainment, and media ==
=== Music ===
- Cornucopia (album), a 1970 album by jazz trumpeter Dizzy Gillespie
- "Cornucopia" (song), song by Black Sabbath from their 1972 album Black Sabbath Vol. 4
- "Cornucopia", the second single from the album Harakiri by Serj Tankian
- Cornucopia (concert tour), a 2019 Björk concert tour
- Cornucopia (film), 2025 film from concert tour by Björk

=== Other arts, entertainment, and media ===
- Cornucopia (magazine), a magazine about Turkish culture
- Cornucopia, the fourth add-on to the card game Dominion
- CORNucopia, Historic Hudson Valley's annual autumn corn harvest festival, held at Philipsburg Manor in Sleepy Hollow, New York

== Other uses ==
- Cornucopia Institute, a non-profit organization in Cornucopia, Wisconsin focused on small-scale farming
- Teatro da Cornucópia, theatre company in Lisbon

== See also ==
- Cornucopian, an optimistic futurist
