= First Round Capital =

Venture capital firm

- Industry: Venture Capital
- Founded: 2004; 22 years ago
- Founder: Josh Kopelman; Howard L. Morgan
- Headquarters: San Francisco
- Website: www.firstround.com

First Round Capital is an American venture capital firm that specializes in providing seed-stage funding to technology companies. Founded in 2004 by Josh Kopelman and Howard Morgan it is considered to be one of the leading and most active early stage investing firms. First Round has invested in over 500 startups since its founding, including Roblox, Square, Notion, Looker, Verkada, Clay, Fal.ai, Together AI, K2 Space, Parallel, Omni, Pomelo, Reducto, and Rillet. It has offices in San Francisco, New York, and Philadelphia.

== Founding and partnership ==
First Round Capital was founded in 2004 by Josh Kopelman and Howard Morgan. Kopelman had previously founded Half.com, which was acquired by eBay in 2000. Morgan helped found Idealab and served as Founding President of Renaissance Technologies.

The firm was established to focus exclusively on seed-stage investing at a time when most venture capital firms concentrated on later-stage deals. By 2009, Bloomberg reported that First Round had become the country’s most active seed-stage investor.

Morgan retired in 2017, while Kopelman remained as Managing Partner of the firm. He has been named to the Forbes Midas List of top technology investors multiple times, including a ranking of 4th in 2015, after leading First Round’s investments in Notion, Clover, AppNexus, and Flatiron Health.

In addition to Kopelman, First Round’s partners include Bill Trenchard, who joined in 2012 and has made the Midas List five times after leading investments in Looker, Verkada, and Flexport, Brett Berson, who started at First Round in 2008 as a college intern before being named a partner in 2016, Todd Jackson, who spent his career in product management at some of the biggest companies in tech, including Google, Facebook, Twitter, Dropbox, and Liz Wessel, who joined in 2023 and was named to the Forbes Midas Brink List in 2025.

== Investments ==
First Round was described by The Wall Street Journal as one of the most active US venture firms and maintains a generalist focus on investing across sectors including AI, consumer, enterprise software, fintech, hardware, and healthcare.

First Round was the first institutional investor in Uber, leading the company’s seed funding round in 2010 when the company was known as UberCab. According to The Wall Street Journal, First Round invested approximately $1.6 million in Uber’s first two funding rounds, which was worth about $2.5 billion at the time of the company’s 2019 IPO. That same fund contained the firm’s investments in Roblox and Square. The firm invested in Roblox in July 2009 holding approximately 6.8% of the company at the time of its 2021 direct listing.

First Round was also one of the earliest outside backers for Looker and led its $2 million seed round in April 2013. The data analytics company was acquired by Google for $2.6 billion in 2020. In 2013, First Round also invested in Notion, writing the biggest check in the productivity startup’s $2 million seed round in 2013.

=== Healthcare ===
The firm was also an early investor in Flatiron Health, which was acquired by Roche for $1.9 billion in 2018. First Round led the 2021 seed round for Pomelo Care, a virtual maternal health company, which reached a $1.7 billion valuation in January 2026. First Round also co-led the 2017 seed round for Stedi, a healthcare clearinghouse, which raised a total of $142 million in venture capital funding.

=== Hardware and deep tech ===
First Round invested in the 2017 $3.9M seed round of Verkada, a cloud-based enterprise security camera company that was recently valued at $5.8 billion in December 2025. The firm was also a pre-seed investor in K2 Space, a satellite manufacturing company founded by former SpaceX engineers that reached a $3 billion valuation in December 2025.

=== Artificial Intelligence ===
First Round has made multiple investments in AI companies. The firm was an investor in the 2017 seed round of Clay, an AI-powered sales automation platform valued at $3.1 billion in August 2025. In 2022, the firm also invested in fal, a generative media infrastructure platform valued at $4.5 billion after a December 2025 funding round. The firm also invested in the seed round of Parallel, an AI web infrastructure company founded by former Twitter CEO Parag Agrawal, which reached a $740 million valuation in November 2025. Additional AI investments include the seed rounds of Together AI (which builds open-source generative AI models), Reducto (AI document parsing & extraction software), and Rillet (an AI-native ERP).

Year	Companies
2020s	Together AI, Fal, Parallel, K2 Space, Pomelo Care, Omni, Reducto, Rillet, Prepared
2010s	Notion, Clay, Looker, Flatiron Health, Verkada, Upstart, EvolutionIQ, Ring, Clover Health, SingleStore, Warby Parker
2000s	Uber, Roblox, Square, AppNexus, Mint

== Programs ==
With one of the largest seed-focused teams in venture, First Round operates several programs for founders and startup leaders.

In 2012, First Round Capital created the Dorm Room Fund, a fund focused on investments in student-run startups.In 2012 First Round Capital created the Dorm Room Fund, a $10 million fund focused on investments in student-run startups. In 2019, the firm launched the Graduate Fund, a pre-seed fund for recent graduates of undergraduate or master's programs. The firm is operated by full-time undergraduate and graduate students.

In 2013, the firm launched First Round Review, an online publication featuring interviews and tactical advice for startup founders with widely read articles on topics such as finding product-market fit and “co-founder dating”.

In 2016, Business Insider reported on the firm’s Pitch Assist program, which helps founders improve their investor presentations.

First Round also runs Angel Track, a program launched in 2018 for training startup executives in angel investing. As of 2023, the program has over 400 alumni.

In 2024, First Round launched PMF Method, an intensive program with a tactical framework designed to help founders find product-market fit.
