= Josh Kopelman =

American entrepreneur and venture capitalist

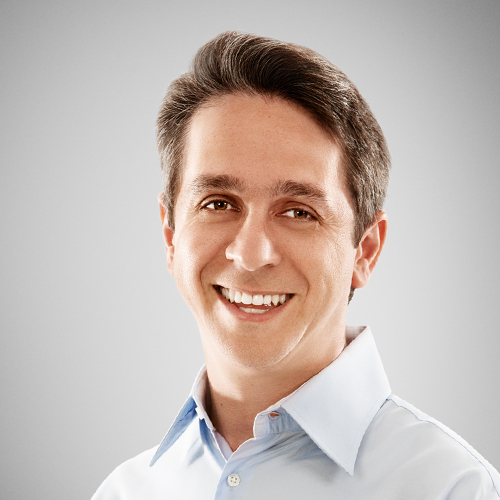
- Born: 1970 or 1971 (age 55–56)
- Education: University of Pennsylvania (B.S.)
- Alma mater: Wharton School at the University of Pennsylvania
- Occupations: Entrepreneur; Venture capitalist; Philanthropist
- Known for: Founder of Half.com, Infonautics, TurnTide, First Round Capital
- Spouse: Rena Cohen (m. 1995)
- Children: 2
- Parent(s): Carol and Dr. Richard Kopelman

Joshua Kopelman (born 1970 or 1971) is an American entrepreneur, venture capitalist, and philanthropist. Kopelman has consistently been ranked as one of the world's top 20 venture capitalists. He was the founder of First Round Capital, and before that, a founder of Half.com, which he sold to eBay in 2000. He also founded Infonautics and TurnTide. Kopelman was chairman of the board of The Philadelphia Inquirer from 2015 to 2024, when he was elected chair emeritus.

== Early life and education ==
Kopelman grew up in Great Neck, New York on Long Island, the son of Carol and Dr. Richard Kopelman. His father was a professor at Baruch College and his mother a real estate broker.

He attended the Wharton School at the University of Pennsylvania, graduating in 1993 with a BS in Entrepreneurial Management and Marketing. In 1992, during his sophomore year at the Wharton School, Kopelman co-founded Infonautics, based in Wayne, Pennsylvania.

== Career ==
=== Infonautics and Half.com ===
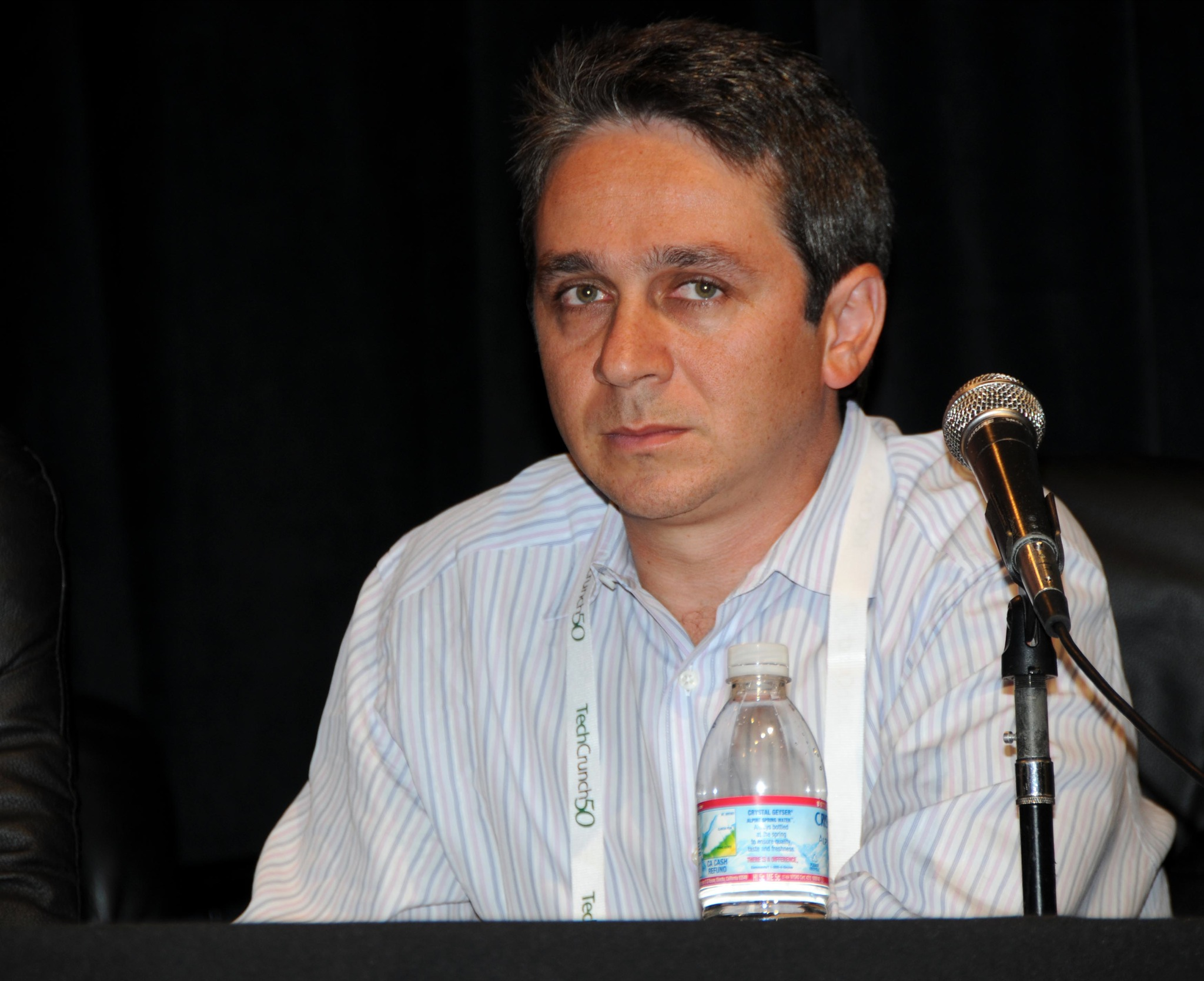
Kopelman in 2008

In 1996, his startup Infonautics went public on the Nasdaq stock exchange. Three years later, in 1999, Kopelman left Infonautics to found Half.com, a fixed price marketplace platform for used books, music and videos. He sold Half.com to eBay in 2000 for $300 million.

After selling Half.com to eBay in 2000, Kopelman remained with eBay for three years.

=== Turntide ===
In 2004, Kopelman co-founded TurnTide, an anti-spam technology company that was acquired by Symantec within six months of its founding.

=== First Round ===
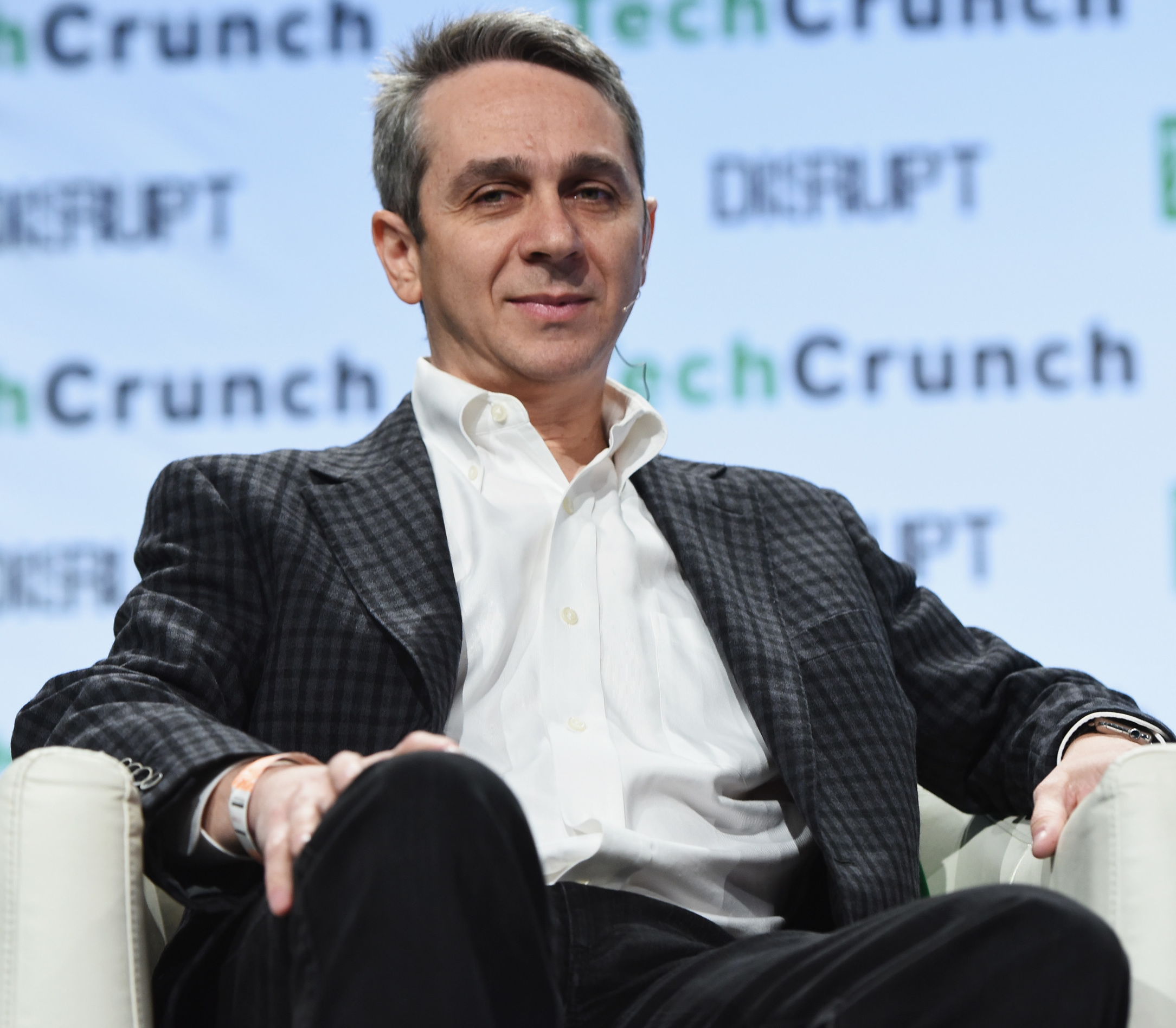
Kopelman in 2016

In 2004 Kopelman was the co-founder of First Round Capital, a seed-stage venture fund. In 2007, Kopelman helped to coin the phrase the "implicit web" to describe the Semantic Web. Kopelman in 2013 was managing director of First Round Capital, and an investor, director, and advisor to OnDeck Capital, Flatiron Health, Aster Data Systems, Knewton, Gigya, AltSchool, The Black Tux, Five Below, Massdrop, Like.com, IronPort, Mint.com, Monetate, LinkedIn, ModCloth, AppNexus, BankSimple, Swipely, True & Co., Wanelo, Warby Parker, Ring.com, Numerai, OpenX, LiveOps, Boxed.com, Clover Health, Upstart and Discourse. As of 2014, Kopelman was an inventor on 16 U.S. patents for his work in internet technology. First Round by 2014 had invested in 300 technology startups. In 2016, he remained with First Capital as a managing director. After First Round Capital invested in "Uber-Cab" in 2010 for $510,000, the firm profited significantly in 2019 when Uber had its initial public offering. In March 2020, he took part in a $4.2 million funding round for Coursedog.

== Boards ==
He joined the board of the Philadelphia Media Network, later The Philadelphia Inquirer, in 2015. In 2016, he was elected chairman of the board of directors of The Philadelphia Inquirer, a position he continued to retain as of 2020. He finished his term in June 2024 after reaching his term limit. Kopelman was elected by the board to a three-year term as chair emeritus.

== Recognition ==
In 2008, Kopelman ranked 3rd on the New York Times list of Top Venture Capitalists and has ranked in the top 20 of the Forbes Midas List of the top 100 tech investors, including 18th in 2011, 6th in 2012, 12th in 2013, 11th in 2014, 4th in 2015, 6th in 2016, 35th in 2017, 19th in 2018, 39th in 2019, and 79th in 2020.

In 2007, Kopelman was named one of "Tech's New Kingmakers" by Business 2.0 magazine, as a "Rising VC Star" by Fortune magazine in 2008, and as one of the top ten angel investors in the United States by Newsweek in 2014.

== Personal life ==
In 1995, Kopelman married Rena Cohen, an attorney, in Great Neck, New York. Kopelman and his wife as of 2021 lived in a suburb of Philadelphia with their two children. In 2001, he and his wife created the Kopelman Foundation, a non-profit philanthropic organization to provide start-up grants to social entrepreneurs. In 2002, the Kopelman Foundation funded a project to digitize and host the complete text of the Jewish Encyclopedia online.
