= Oregon Route 86 =

State highway in Baker County, Oregon, US

Oregon Route 86
- Route 86 highlighted in red

Route information
- Maintained by ODOT
- Length: 67.82 mi (109.15 km)
- Existed: 1932–present

Major junctions
- West end: I-84 / US 30 in Baker City
- OR 86S in Halfway; OR 414 in Halfway
- East end: Near Hells Canyon, ID

Location
- Country: United States
- State: Oregon
- County: Baker

Highway system
- Oregon Highways; Interstate; US; State; Named; Scenic
← I-84	→ US 95

Oregon Route 86 is an Oregon state highway running from Interstate 84 at Baker City to the Idaho state line at Oxbow (near the former site of Copperfield). OR 86 comprises most of the Baker-Copperfield Highway No. 12 (see Oregon highways and routes). It is 67.82 miles (109.15 km) long and runs east–west. OR 86 has an unsigned spur near Halfway, which runs for 1.15 miles (1.85 km). Most of OR 86 is part of the Hells Canyon Scenic Byway.

== Route description ==
OR 86 begins at an intersection with I-84 near Baker City. It heads east through Richland and turns north toward Halfway, to which the spur connects. Shortly after the spur departs, OR 86 intersects OR 414, which also heads to Halfway. OR 86 then turns northeast and continues to the Idaho state line on the Snake River at Oxbow. Just before the state line, a county road turns off to the south, following the river to the Brownlee Dam and Idaho State Highway 71.

The spur begins at an intersection near Halfway and heads northeast into Halfway, where it ends at an intersection with OR 413 and OR 414.

== History ==
Highway 12 was established in 1917 as the Baker-Cornucopia Highway, running from Baker (now Baker City) to Cornucopia. It was designated OR 86 when the Oregon route numbering system was initiated in 1932.

In 1935, Highway 12 was divided at Halfway into the Baker-Homestead Highway and the Halfway-Cornucopia Highway No. 413. The OR 86 designation was removed from the Halfway-Cornucopia highway.

In 1959, Highway 12 was rebuilt between Richland and Halfway, and the portion of the Pine Creek Highway No. 414 from Halfway to Copperfield was reassigned to Highway 12. Highway 12 was then renamed the Baker-Copperfield Highway and the OR 86 designation extended along its full length.

In 1976, with the construction of what was then Interstate 80N and is now Interstate 84, the Baker-Copperfield Highway was realigned onto the freeway and the OR 86 designation removed from the freeway section and the section west of the freeway. The section west of I-84 was added to OR 7.

== Major intersections ==
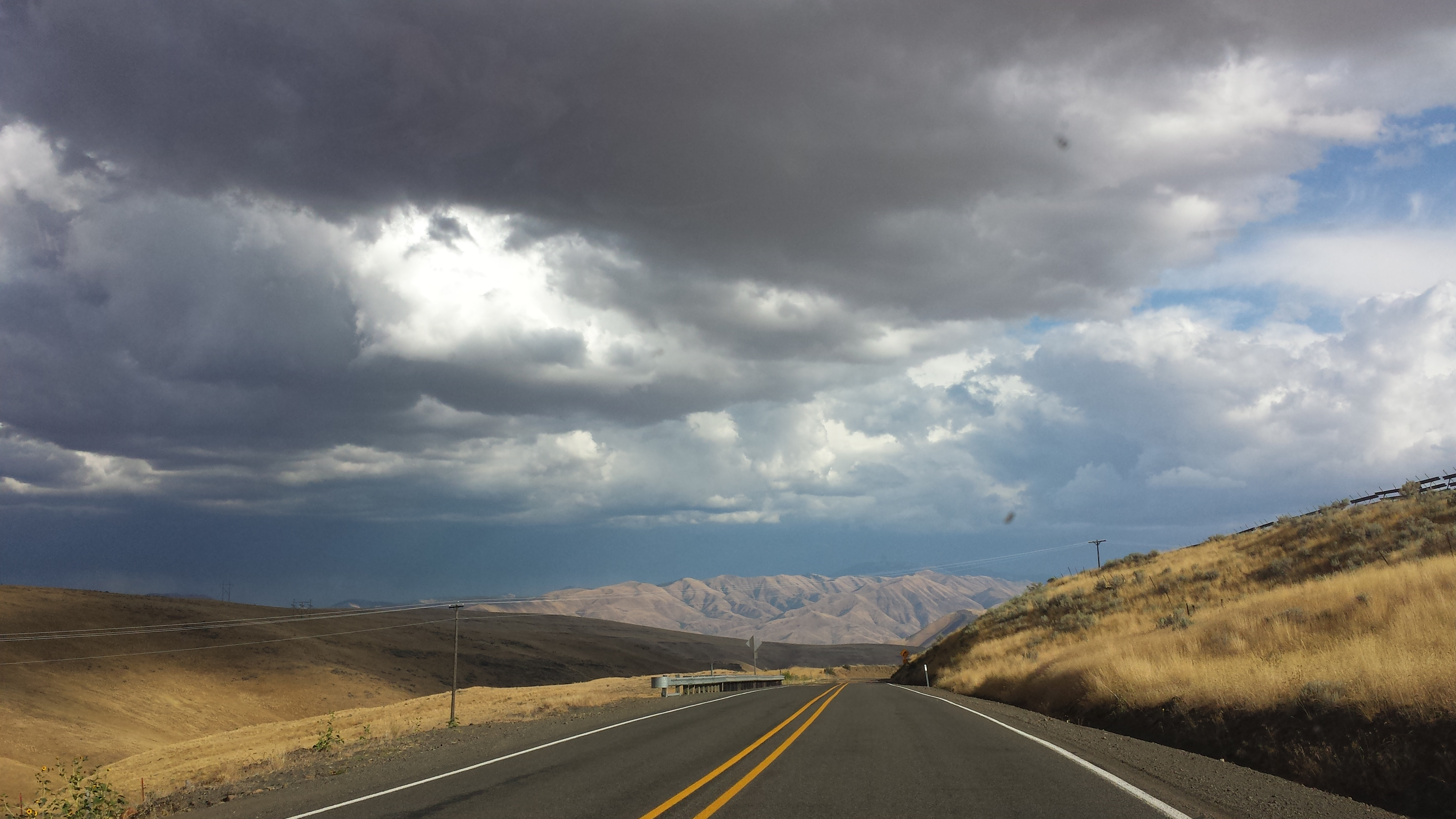
Highway 86, from Halfway to Richland.

The entire route is in Baker County.

Location	mi	km	Destinations	Notes
	2.43	3.91	I-84 – La Grande, Baker City, Ontario	I-84 exit 302
	53.55	86.18	OR 86S – Halfway, Cornucopia	
	54.39	87.53	OR 414 – Halfway, Cornucopia	
	63.50	102.19	Hells Canyon Overlook, Imnaha, Joseph	
	70.48	113.43	Oxbow Dam, Brownlee Dam, Cambridge	
	70.56	113.56	Oxbow, Homestead, Hells Canyon Trail	
	70.80	113.94	Idaho state line	
1.000 mi = 1.609 km; 1.000 km = 0.621 mi

=== Spur ===
The entire route is in Baker County.

Location	mi	km	Destinations	Notes
	53.55	86.18	OR 86 – Baker City, Oxbow	
Halfway	54.70	88.03	To OR 86 (OR 413 / OR 414) – Carson, Cornucopia, Oxbow, Hells Canyon Dam	
1.000 mi = 1.609 km; 1.000 km = 0.621 mi
