= Knewton =

American educational technology company

Knewton, Inc.
- Type: Private
- Industry: Education Technology
- Founded: 2008
- Headquarters: New York, NY
- Key people: Brian Kibby (CEO); Ryan Prichard (CTO President); Jennifer Grunebaum (CFO) Jose Ferreira (Founder)
- Services: Infrastructure platform for adaptive learning
- Number of employees: 150
- Website: knewton.com

Knewton is an adaptive learning company that has developed a platform to personalize educational content as well as has developed courseware for higher education concentrated in the fields of science, technology, engineering, and mathematics. The company was founded in 2008 by Jose Ferreira, a former executive at Kaplan, Inc. The Knewton platform allows schools, publishers, and developers to provide adaptive learning for any student. In 2011, Knewton announced a partnership with Pearson Education to enhance the company's digital content, including the MyLab and Mastering series. Additional partners announced include Houghton Mifflin Harcourt, Macmillan Education, Triumph Learning, and others.

Knewton's headquarters are at 440 Park Avenue South in Manhattan, New York City. The company also has an office in Tech City, London.

The company's assets were acquired by Wiley in May 2019.

== Description ==
Knewton is an adaptive learning technology provider that makes it possible for others to build adaptive learning applications. In 2016, the company also began developing courseware for higher education classes using content from educational companies and open educational resources. Knewton technology enables the company to perform "sophisticated, real-time analysis of reams of student performance data." Knewton uses adaptive learning technology to identify each student's particular strengths and weaknesses. Concepts are tagged at very specific levels, which allows the platform to make custom recommendations based on students’ proficiency and needs. The company first launched with a GMAT preparation course, which has now been discontinued.

In 1995, researchers now working for Knewton proved that the small question pool available to the Graduate Record Examination (GRE) computer-adaptive test made it vulnerable to cheating.

In January 2011, Arizona State University began running developmental math and blended learning courses using Knewton's adaptive technology. "The portion of students withdrawing from the courses fell from 13% to 6%, and pass rates rose from 66% to 75%".

== Funding and asset sale ==
In its first round of funding, Knewton raised $2.5 million in investment capital from Accel Partners, Reid Hoffman, Ron Conway, and Josh Kopelman at First Round Capital. In April 2009 Knewton closed a $6 million round of funding led by Bessemer Venture Partners with returning investors, and in April 2010 Knewton closed a $12.5 million round of funding led by FirstMark Capital with returning investors. In October 2011 the company closed a $33 million series D round of funding led by the Founders Fund. In December 2013 the company closed a $51 million series E round of funding led by Atomico, joined by GSV Capital and returning investors. In February 2016, Knewton closed a series F $52 million round, its largest to date, led by Sofina and Atomico.

In May 2019, Wiley acquired the assets of Knewton. Financial terms of the deal were not initially disclosed, but a quarterly earnings report indicated that Knewton was acquired for less than $17 million.
