= Koppelman =

Koppelman is a surname. It may refer to:

- Andrew Koppelman (born 1957), professor of law and political science
- Ben Koppelman (born 1980), politician
- Brian Koppelman (born 1966), American filmmaker
- Chaim Koppelman (1920–2009), artist
- Charles Koppelman (1940–2022), American musician and businessman
- Elaine Koppelman (1937–2019), American mathematician
- Kim Koppelman (born 1956), politician
- Lee Koppelman (born 1928), urban planner

== See also ==
- Kopelman
