= Encyclopedia.com =

Online encyclopedia

- Screenshot Homepage in October 2024
- Website type: Online encyclopedia
- Available in: English
- Owner: Gale
- Creator: Infonautics
- Revenue: Display advertising
- Website: www.encyclopedia.com
- Commercial: Yes
- Registration: No
- Launched: March 1998; 28 years ago
- Current status: Online
- Content license: Copyrighted
- OCLC number: 405663034

Encyclopedia.com is an online encyclopedia. It aggregates information, images, and videos from other published dictionaries, encyclopedias, and reference works.

== History ==
The website was launched by Infonautics in March 1998. Infonautics was acquired by Tucows in August 2001.

In August 2002, Patrick Spain bought Encyclopedia.com and its sister website eLibrary from Tucows and incorporated them into a new company called Alacritude, LLC (a combination of Alacrity and Attitude). The business became known as HighBeam Research and was eventually sold to Gale. For a time the website was operated by Chicago-based company Highbeam Research, a subsidiary of reference publisher Gale, which itself is a subsidiary of Cengage.

Enycyclopedia.com saw its traffic decline by more than three quarters from approximately 4 million visits monthly in 2022, to under 1 million in 2025.

== Content ==
Encyclopedia.com allows users to access information on a subject that is derived from multiple encyclopedias and dictionary sources, and it has nearly 200,000 entries and 50,000 topic summaries. It provides a collection of online encyclopedias and entries from various sources, including Oxford University Press, Columbia Encyclopedia, and Gale, its parent company.
