= Argumentation and Advocacy =

- Discipline: Argumentation theory
- Language: English
- Edited by: Katie Langford

Publication details
- Former name(s): Journal of the American Forensic Association
- History: 1964–present
- Publisher: Taylor & Francis (United States)
- Frequency: Quarterly

Standard abbreviations
- ISO 4: Argum. Advocacy

Indexing
- ISSN: 0002-8533 (print); 1051-1431 (web)
- LCCN: 90643823
- OCLC no.: 18603907

Links
- Journal homepage; Online access; Online archive

Argumentation and Advocacy is a quarterly peer-reviewed academic journal published by Taylor & Francis, edited by Beth Innocenti of University of Kansas. The journal was previously edited by Katherine Langford, Harry Weger, Catherine H. Palczewski, and John Fritch.

== Aims and scope ==
The journal's focus is on moving the study of argumentation forward, including articles which are theoretical and critical in the broad subject areas of argumentation theory, public argument, critical and cultural perspectives, and forensics and pedagogy. The journal includes reviews of pertinent books. It includes the arts and sciences of civil debate, dialogue, conversation, and persuasion. It covers studies of rules of inference, logic, and procedural rules in both artificial and real world settings. This includes debate and negotiation, which are concerned with reaching mutually acceptable conclusions.

== Abstracting and indexing ==
The journal is abstracted and indexed in:

- ProQuest International Academic Research Library, Humanities
- Infonautics Information Services
- Communication and Mass Media Complete, EBSCO Information Services
- UnCover Information Services
- Online Index of Forensic Research, The Minnesota State University-Mankato
