= Cornucopia Peak =

Mountain peak in Oregon, United States

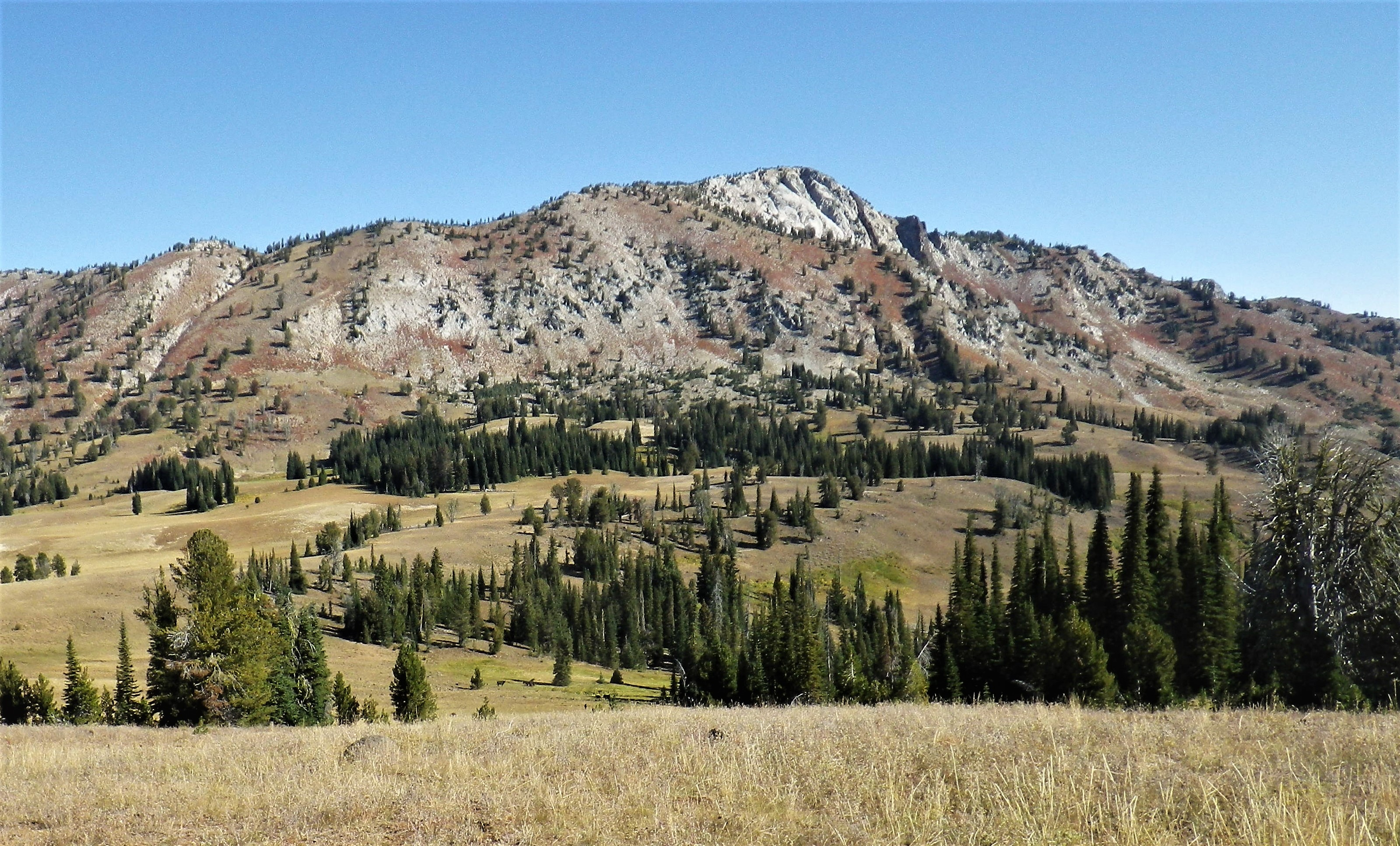
- South aspect

Highest point
- Elevation: 8,643 ft (2,634 m)
- Prominence: 430 ft (131 m)
- Isolation: 1.18 mi (1.90 km)
- Coordinates: 45°01′13″N 117°14′19″W

Naming
- Etymology: Cornucopia

Geography
- Location within Oregon Location within the United States
- Location: Eagle Cap Wilderness
- Country: United States of America
- State: Oregon
- County: Baker
- Parent range: Wallowa Mountains
- Topo map: USGS Cornucopia

Geology
- Rock type: granitic Cordierite Trondhjemite

Climbing
- Easiest route: scrambling

Cornucopia Peak is a mountain summit located in Baker County, Oregon, US.

== Description ==
Cornucopia Peak is located in the southern Wallowa Mountains and is set along the boundary of the Eagle Cap Wilderness on land managed by Wallowa–Whitman National Forest. The 8,643-foot elevation (2,634 m) peak ranks as the 87th-highest mountain in Oregon. The peak is situated immediately west-northwest of ghost town Cornucopia and 14 miles northwest of Halfway, Oregon. Precipitation runoff from the mountain drains to the Snake River via Pine Creek. Topographic relief is significant as the summit rises nearly 4,000 feet (1,200 meters) above the ghost town in two miles.

== History ==
This landform's toponym has been officially adopted by the United States Board on Geographic Names. The peak is named in association with the gold mining boomtown of Cornucopia which became active in the late 1800s. The Cornucopia mines on the peak's east slope were ranked number one of lode mines in Oregon. A fire lookout was built on the summit in 1924, but no longer exists having been removed long ago. Cornucopia Peak is an attractive backcountry ski destination in winter, but in 2014 a guided tour of eight skiers was caught in an avalanche resulting in two fatalities and two others severely injured.

== Climate ==
Based on the Köppen climate classification, Cornucopia Peak is located in a subarctic climate zone characterized by long, usually very cold winters, and mild summers. Winter temperatures can drop below −10 °F with wind chill factors below −20 °F. Most precipitation in the area is caused by orographic lift. Thunderstorms are common in the summer.

== See also ==
- List of mountain peaks of Oregon

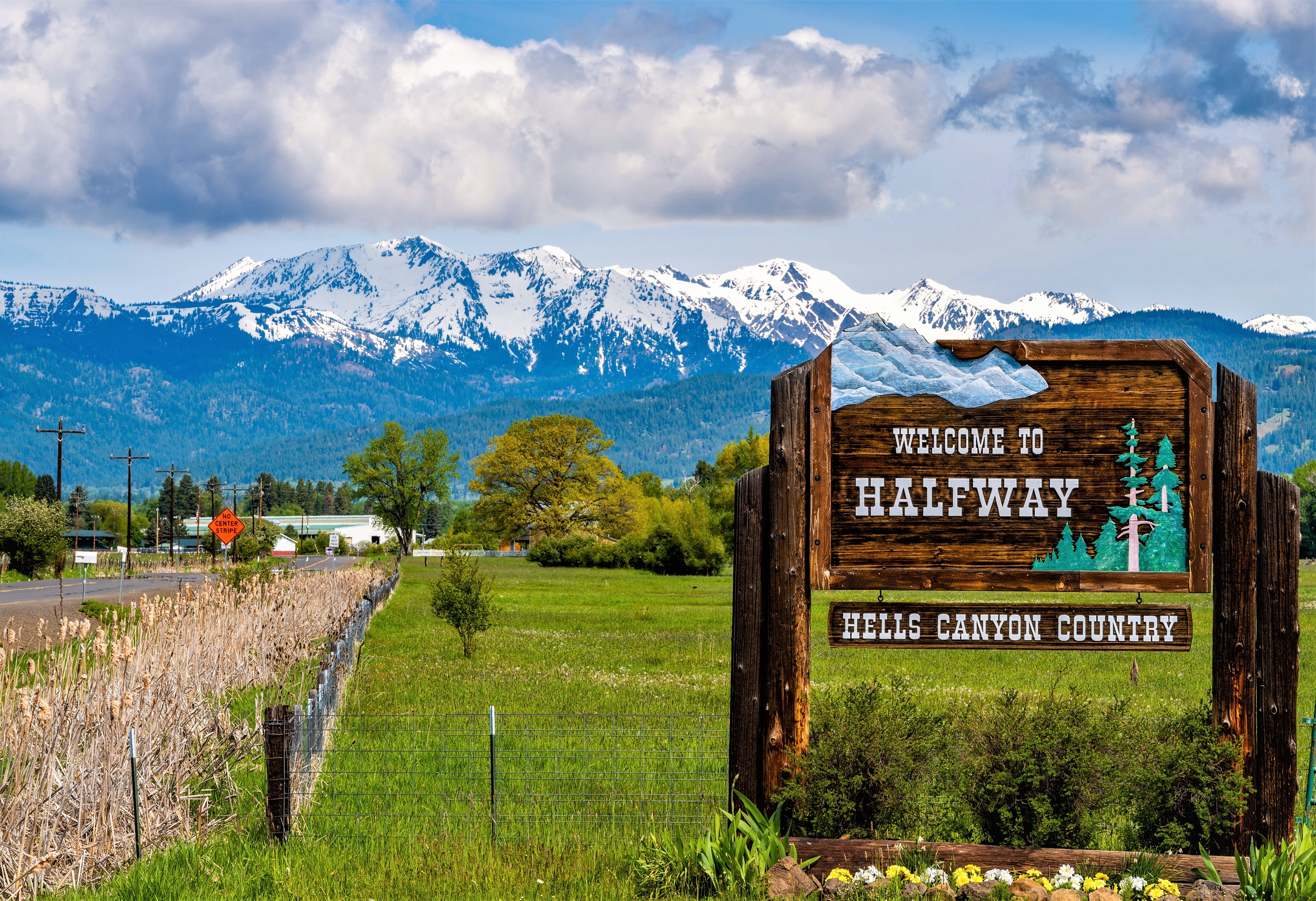
Cornucopia Peak from Halfway, Oregon
