= East Fork Falls (Baker County, Oregon) =

Waterfall in Oregon, United States

- Interactive map of East Fork Falls
- Location: Near Baker City, Oregon
- Coordinates: 45.04278°N 117.17611°W
- Elevation: 6,173 feet (1,882 m)
- Total height: 10 ft (3 m)

East Fork Falls is a waterfall along East Fork Pine Creek in the U.S. state of Oregon just east of Baker City in the south stretch of the Wallowa–Whitman National Forest.

East Fork Falls are a short distance north of the ghost town of Cornucopia along the Oregon-Idaho border. Access to East Fork in the Southern Wallowa Mountains starting at the Cornucopia trailhead up trail East Fork #1865.

== See also ==
- List of waterfalls in Oregon
