= Upserve =

Restaurant management platform

Upserve, Inc.
- Type: Subsidiary
- Industry: Point of sale
- Founded: 2009
- Headquarters: Providence, Rhode Island
- Key people: Angus Davis, Josh Kopelman, and Reid Hoffman
- Products: Restaurant point of sale
- Website: upserve.com

Upserve, originally Swipely, provides a restaurant management platform which allows independent full-service restaurants to run and manage their entire business. The Platform is made up of restaurant-specific point of sale (POS) software, payments, and analytics, online ordering, loyalty, and marketing tools designed specifically for restaurants. At the center of the Upserve Platform is the cloud-based Upserve POS, a point of sale system that Upserve acquired from Groupon in 2016.

In 2013, Forbes magazine included Swipely in its list of the top 100 “America’s Most Promising Companies.” In 2017, Upserve received a nine-figure investment from Vista Equity Partners.

== History ==
Upserve, formerly Swipely, was founded in 2009 by Angus Davis, the co-founder of Tellme Networks, which was acquired by Microsoft in 2007. Swipely was formerly a social network in which members shared their purchases with friends.

In February 2011, Swipely evolved into a loyalty platform for local merchants to reward repeat customers. In 2016, Swipely acquired Breadcrumb POS from Groupon and rebranded to Upserve in order to reflect its offering of a comprehensive management system for the restaurant industry.

In 2017, Upserve expanded its Restaurant Management Platform by offering integrated online ordering through a partnership with Grubhub, as well as its own online ordering solution. In 2018, Upserve partnered with Resy to produce an industry-first POS integration to streamline reservations and table management. Additionally, it introduced Upserve Marketplace, which is a hub of integrated restaurant technology for its customers to tie together disparate systems.

In 2020, Upserve was acquired by Lightspeed for $430 million. Six years later, Lightspeed sold Upserve in April 2026 to Skyview Equity.

== Financials and expansion ==
The Providence start-up was the first Rhode Island–based software company to raise $7.5 million in Series A venture capital. In 2013, Upserve secured a $12 million Series B investment led by Shasta Ventures and raised a $20 million Series C led by the Pritzker Group bringing the total funds raised to $40.5 million.

In July 2017, Upserve received an investment of more than $100 million from Vista Equity Partners.

In 2018, Upserve opened an office in Denver adding to its existing office locations in San Francisco and New York, along with headquarters in Providence, RI.

In July 2018, Upserve announced the acquisition of Israel-based inventory management platform SimpleOrder.

== Recognition ==
Swipely was named one of Forbes magazine's “America’s Most Promising Companies” in 2013. The company is the first Rhode Island–based firm on this Forbes list.

Upserve has been featured in New York Times, Forbes, CBS This Morning, Wall Street Journal, Inc., Entrepreneur, Boston Globe, Thrillist, BostInno, Quartz, and RestaurantInsider.
