= Medifé =

Argentine prepaid medicine company

- Company type: Private
- Industry: Healthcare; Retail
- Headquarters: Argentina
- Area served: Argentina
- Services: Medical insurance
- Website: www.medife.com.ar

Medifé is an Argentine prepaid medicine company. The company's services are available nationwide.

== Awards and sponsorships ==
The company has a foundation, Fundación Medifè, which sponsors the prestigious Filba de Novela Award for novelists; past winners include Irene Kopelman and Diego Muzzio. In 2016, it sponsored the Copa Patagonia Argentine basketball tournament, and it sponsors the Argentine National Basketball League's tournament.

According to their website, they also sponsor various rugby and hockey teams and Gimnasia y Tiro sports clubs.
