= Monetate =

American software company

Monetate, Inc.
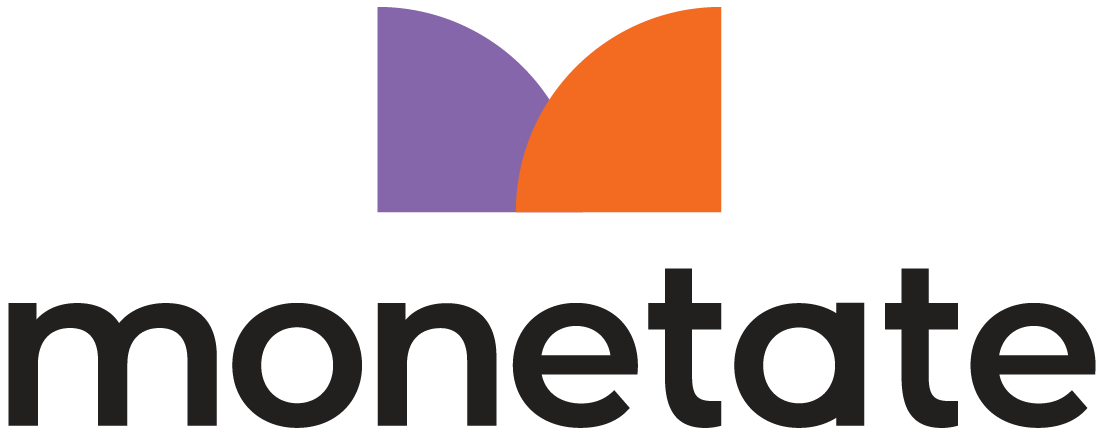
- Type: Private
- Industry: Software, Website Optimization
- Founded: 2008
- Founder: David Brussin, David Bookspan
- Fate: Acquired
- Successor: Kibo, Centre Lane Partners
- Headquarters: Conshohocken, Pennsylvania
- Area served: Worldwide
- Key people: Brian Wilson, CEO; Eric Rosado, CPO; Austin Rochford, CTO; K.C. Attaya, CFO; Andrew Koperwas, CMO; Adrian Moss, General Manager, EMEA & APAJ; Jessica McDouall, CCO
- Production output: Monetate Personalization Platform; Monetate Personalization Engine; Monetate A/B/n Testing; Monetate Product Recommendations; Monetate Product Finder; Monetate Social Proof; Monetate Automated Personalization
- Website: http://www.monetate.com

Monetate is an American software company founded in 2008 that provides A/B/n testing, multivariant testing and personalization software for online retailers, airlines, insurance companies, food & beverage companies, and more.

== History ==
Headquartered in Conshohocken, Pennsylvania with offices in Palo Alto and London, England, Monetate was founded in 2008 by David Brussin and David Bookspan.

In July 2014, Monetate had about 230 employees.

In October 2019, Monetate was acquired by Kibo, a cloud commerce provider wholly owned by Vista Equity Partners for an undisclosed sum. As of 2021, the Monetate brand has been discontinued by Kibo.

In October 2022, Kibo spun out personalization business under the relaunched Monetate brand, including the products of Monetate and Certona. The newly relaunched brand was sold to Centre Lane Partners, a private investment firm.
