= Omni (company) =

American storage and rental company

- Omni logo
- Type: Private
- Industry: Storage, Rental
- Founded: 2014
- Founders: Tom McLeod, Aaron Wiener, Adam Dexter
- Defunct: December 2019
- Headquarters: San Francisco, California, US
- Number of employees: 57 (2018)
- Website: https://beomni.com

Omni was an American tech-based on-demand storage and rental company based in San Francisco, California. Founded in 2014 by Aaron Wiener, Adam Dexter, and CEO Tom McLeod, Omni debuted its service in Fall 2015. Initially, the company focused on storage and space-management: customers would have their items picked up by Omni, which would categorize and photograph them. When the client wanted their item back, they would request to have it dropped off by Omni, possibly at an additional fee. Omni then expanded into offering other services such as the option to lend items to friends and the ability to rent out items for profit. As of July 2018, Omni was only available in the San Francisco Bay area, but had announced plans to expand into Portland, Oregon. Omni had raised around $39 million in investment, with nearly $15 million coming from traditional sources such as venture capital firms and approximately $25 million coming in the form of Ripple.

Omni ceased operation at the end of 2019.

== Services ==
Omni's base service was on-demand storage, which began in Fall 2015 for residents and businesses of the San Francisco area. Clients could request that an Omni concierge come to pick up any items that they wished to store. Omni concierges would take these items and bring them to a warehouse, where they were categorized and photographed. A user's stored items were available in a digital inventory that was accessible through the Omni app. When customers requested that any stored items be returned to them, the items would be retrieved from the warehouse and brought back by an Omni concierge. All items up to $2,000 in value were guaranteed by the company, which would either reimburse or replace them if lost or damaged.

Fees for Omni's storage services varied depending on what was being stored and how quickly the item must be delivered or picked up. "Standard-sized" items, such as a jackets or toasters, cost $0.50 per month to store, while larger items, such as bicycles or backpacks, cost $3. Closed containers, which are not individually itemized, cost $7.50 per month. Deliveries of items to clients cost nothing if a two days' notice were given, while pickups could have been free, even if it were scheduled on the same day. Omni also could deliver and pick up items at a minimum of two hours' notice, though a premium was added for this expedited service.

On top of their storage services, Omni also allowed users to lend items to others, with similar delivery costs and shipping outside of the San Francisco Bay area carrying a 20% surcharge on top of shipping through a non-Omni service.

In Fall 2017, Omni began its rental service, permitting users to rent out any items they store with Omni. Omni would split the proceeds equally with the user.

In May 2018, Omni announced that it would be expanding into the Portland area.

== Reception ==
Views on Omni's business have been mixed. Some consumers have viewed Omni as a viable solution to a lack of space and a way to make money through its rental service. Cyan Bannister, a San Francisco venture capitalist, invested in the company because she believes that "all sorts of businesses will flock to Omni for rentals." The proprietor of a business using Omni, Nicolas Grenie of SF Cheese Party, said that it was easy for him to start his business because Omni handled many of the logistics, but also that the price point seemed unreasonable for Omni to make a profit. The President of Boxbee, a company which had offered a storage and sharing service similar to Omni's, had similar concerns, saying "The cost of storing, transporting and managing a customer’s items is much higher than the cost you can charge on a monthly basis to store it." Similarly, April Rinne, who consults for other on-demand companies, said that Omni was "making some really big bets on volume." Ryan Delk, Chief Operations Officer of Omni, has commented on these concerns, stating that "We invested 2.5 years in building out the supply side of the marketplace and honing the details of a same-day last-mile logistics business."
