= The Black Tux =

American men's clothing company

- Company type: Private
- Headquarters: Santa Monica, California, United States
- Key people: Andrew Blackmon; (co-founder); Patrick Coyne; (co-founder)
- Industry: E-commerce
- Website: www.theblacktux.com

The Black Tux is a men's clothing company specializing in suits, tuxedos and other formalwear. They rent and sell all of their own designs through their e-commerce platform and 50 stores. They have an in-store partnership with Nordstrom where customers can book an appointment to try on garments.

All of their garments are designed by Jake Mueser of the NYC brand J. Mueser.

== History ==
The company was founded in the year 2013 by Andrew Blackmon and Patrick Coyne, and is headquartered in Santa Monica, California. The business was created as a direct response to the co-founders’ poor experiences involving tuxedo and suit rentals for weddings and formal events. Prior to launching publicly, the company was involved with MuckerLab a Los Angeles-based start-up accelerator. The company received $10 million in Series A funding in January 2015 from top venture firms including Menlo Ventures, First Round Capital, Stripes Group and others. They raised an additional $25 million in September 2015 and a subsequent $30 million in 2018, bringing it total funding to over $75 million.

In 2025, The Black Tux partnered with designer is Jake Mueser of the NYC based brand J. Mueser to lead all design direction.

== Business model ==
The Black Tux rents and sells tuxedos, suits, and other formalwear and accessories. They began entirely online but now have over 50 stores. Orders are shipped to the customer and shipping is free both ways. The suit or tuxedo arrives at least a full week prior to customers’ events. The Black Tux designs its tuxedos and suits and offers dress shirts, shoes, neckwear, and other formal wear accessories in order to offer a better fit and higher quality garment. The business is now profitable generating over $100 million in sales per year.

== Reception ==
Shortly after launching out of beta, The Black Tux was featured in GQ, which called the company “the Warby Parker of the formalwear game” and declared “The Black Tux has come to rescue guys from tux-rental hell.” Since launching they have been featured in The Wall Street Journal, Bloomberg, and Techcrunch. In December 2013, The Black Tux raised funding from investors in the venture capital community.
