= Cornucopia (Middletown, Delaware) =

Historic house in Delaware, US

- U.S. National Register of Historic Places
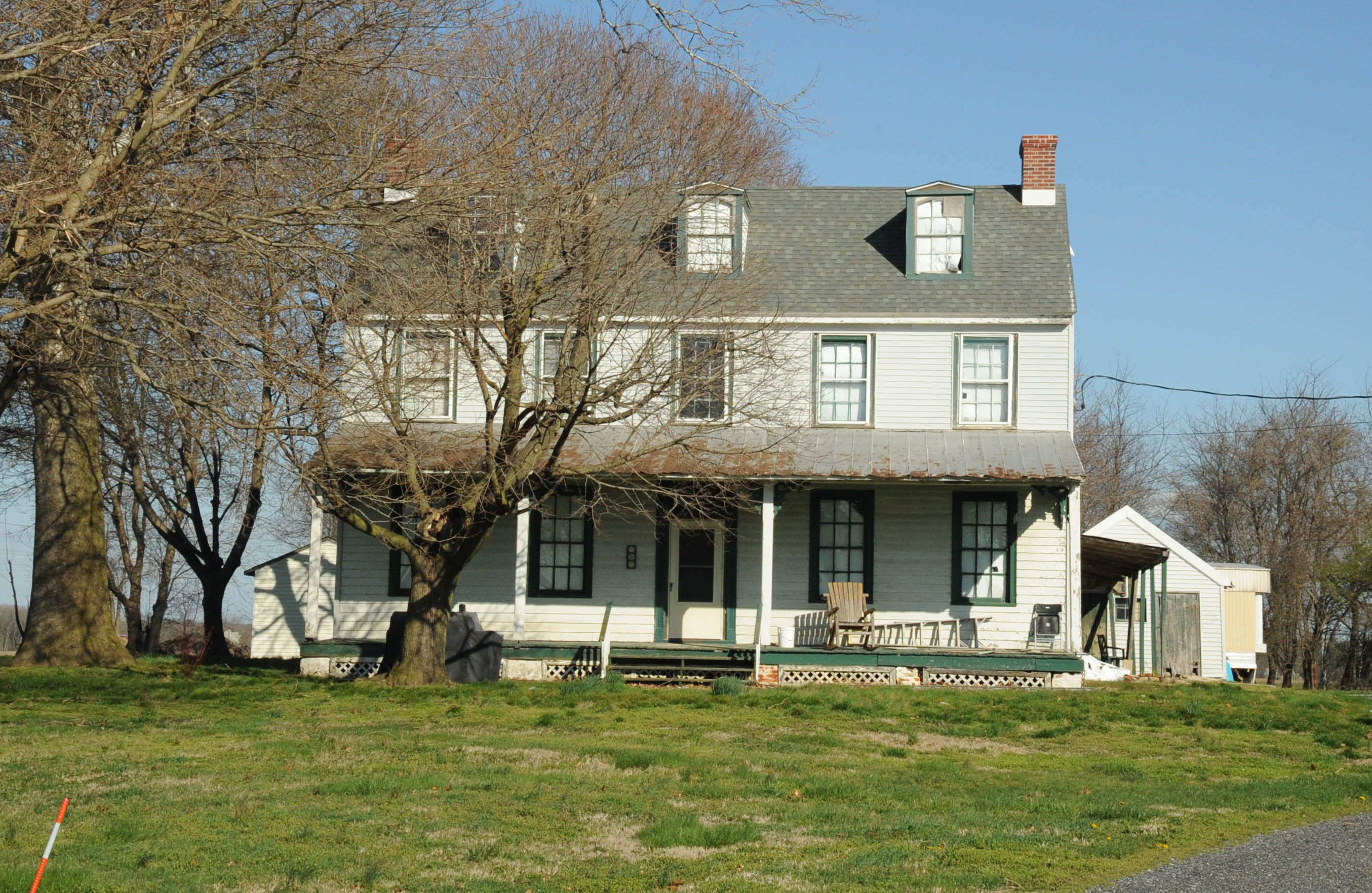

- Location within Delaware Location within the United States
- Location: 1377 Bethel Church Road in Pencader Hundred, nearMiddletown, Delaware
- Coordinates: 39.525742°N 75.773122°W
- Area: 50 acres (20 ha)
- Built: c. 1845
- Architectural style: Greek Revival
- NRHP reference No.: 87001517
- Added to NRHP: September 8, 1987

Cornucopia, also known as the John and Mary Price Farm, is a historic home and farm located near Middletown in New Castle County, Delaware, United States. The house was built about 1845, and is a 2 1/2-story, five-bay L-shaped frame dwelling with a gable roof in a vernacular Greek Revival style. It has a 1 1/2-story wing and features a tetra-style verandah on brick piers. Also on the property are the contributing meat/dairy house, crib barn, hay barn and cow barn attached by an implement shed, three poultry sheds, and an implement shed with a shop and wagon shed.

It was listed on the National Register of Historic Places in 1987.
