= Half.com =

EBay subsidiary closed in 2017

- Website type: Online shopping
- Dissolved: September 1, 2017; 9 years ago
- Owner: eBay
- Commercial: Yes
- Launched: April 16, 1999; 27 years ago

Half.com was a fixed-price online marketplace for books, textbooks, music, movies, video games, and video game consoles. It was acquired by eBay in 2000 and shut down in 2017, with the domain redirected to the eBay website.

== Overview ==
Half provided a platform where sellers could choose what price to sell their item for. A seller was able to see the average and most recent sale prices for any particular item to determine the selling price desired. A potential buyer could see available inventory for an item and choose their desired seller. This was a different model from eBay, which has buyers bid against one another. The pre-order feature allowed buyers to set a price and quality rating of a particular item they would like to buy. Sellers saw the pre-order listed when they put an item up for sale and could sell it to the buyer if they agreed with the buyer's price.

The company took a commission of every completed sale. The seller was responsible for shipping any item within three business days of a sale and paying the actual shipping costs.

== History ==
Half.com was founded in 1999 by American entrepreneur Josh Kopelman and Sunny Balijepalli. As an advertising gimmick, in December of the same year, the company paid the town of Halfway, Oregon US$100,000 and donated 20 new computers to change its name to "Half.com, Oregon" for a year.

eBay purchased Half.com in 2000 for roughly $350 million, integrating its user management system, buyer/seller feedback, and account information into eBay. Like its parent company, Half.com was not a retail site and had no physical stock or inventory. Rather, the site offered a place for individual sellers to list their items and potential buyers a central location in which to view them, offering both a standardized transaction and money exchange process. Unlike its parent, Half.com was not an auction site; sellers offered their wares at a bid price of their choosing. Like Amazon.com, Half.com played a large role in the used textbook and CD markets. eBay planned to integrate Half.com into eBay and eventually close down Half.com. Many of the features that made listing media items such as CDs and DVDs quick and easy were integrated into eBay, but eBay kept Half.com running separately primarily for the textbook market.

Half.com began accepting PayPal in January 2013, ten and a half years after eBay acquired the service.

On November 17, 2016, it was announced that Half.com commission rates would increase significantly, with lower-priced item rates going from 15% to 25%. The rates went into effect on December 16, 2016, with the initial notification to sellers being sent out less than a month prior and right in the midst of the holiday shopping season. The move was seen as an attempt by eBay to soon force the closure of Half.com.

== Shutdown ==
On June 16, 2017, eBay announced that Half.com would be closing on August 31, 2017. The site closed on September 1, 2017, but continued to process returns and refunds until October 31, 2017.
