= Leon Kopelman =

Warsaw Ghetto Uprising fighter and survivor (1924–2021)

Leon Kopelman (26 April 1924 – 13 August 2021) was the last known survivor from the 1943 Warsaw Ghetto Uprising against the Nazis before his death in 2021 at the age of 97. It was originally thought that Simcha Rotem, who died in 2018, was the last surviving fighter from the Warsaw Ghetto Uprising until Kopelman came forward. Subsequently, Michael Smuss was recognized as the last surviving fighter.

== Warsaw Ghetto ==
By 1942, Nazi Germany occupied the country and established the Warsaw Ghetto, where Kopelman and his family was forced to relocate to. During his time at the ghetto, he became involved in the underground Jewish military that resisted Jewish deportations to concentration camps. His mother was deported to Treblinka when he was 18. He fought in the largest single revolt by Jews during World War II, killing German soldiers in battles before the final confrontation in April 1943. He was captured by the Nazis and evaded being sent to Treblinka along with the other fighters after lying about his experience as a mechanic. In September 1944, he was liberated by Polish resistance fighters. He was captured soon after but again managed to escape and remained free until the Red Army’s arrival in the spring of 1945.

== Post-war life ==
Kopelman would eventually use false identity papers to travel to Italy before boarding an illegal ship to Israel where he was reunited with his remaining family members. He joined the IDF and fought in the 1947–1949 Palestine war. His wife, Hava, who he had been married to for nearly 70 years, died several months before him in 2021. He left behind three children, nine grandchildren and three great-grandchildren.
