= Richland, Oregon =

- City
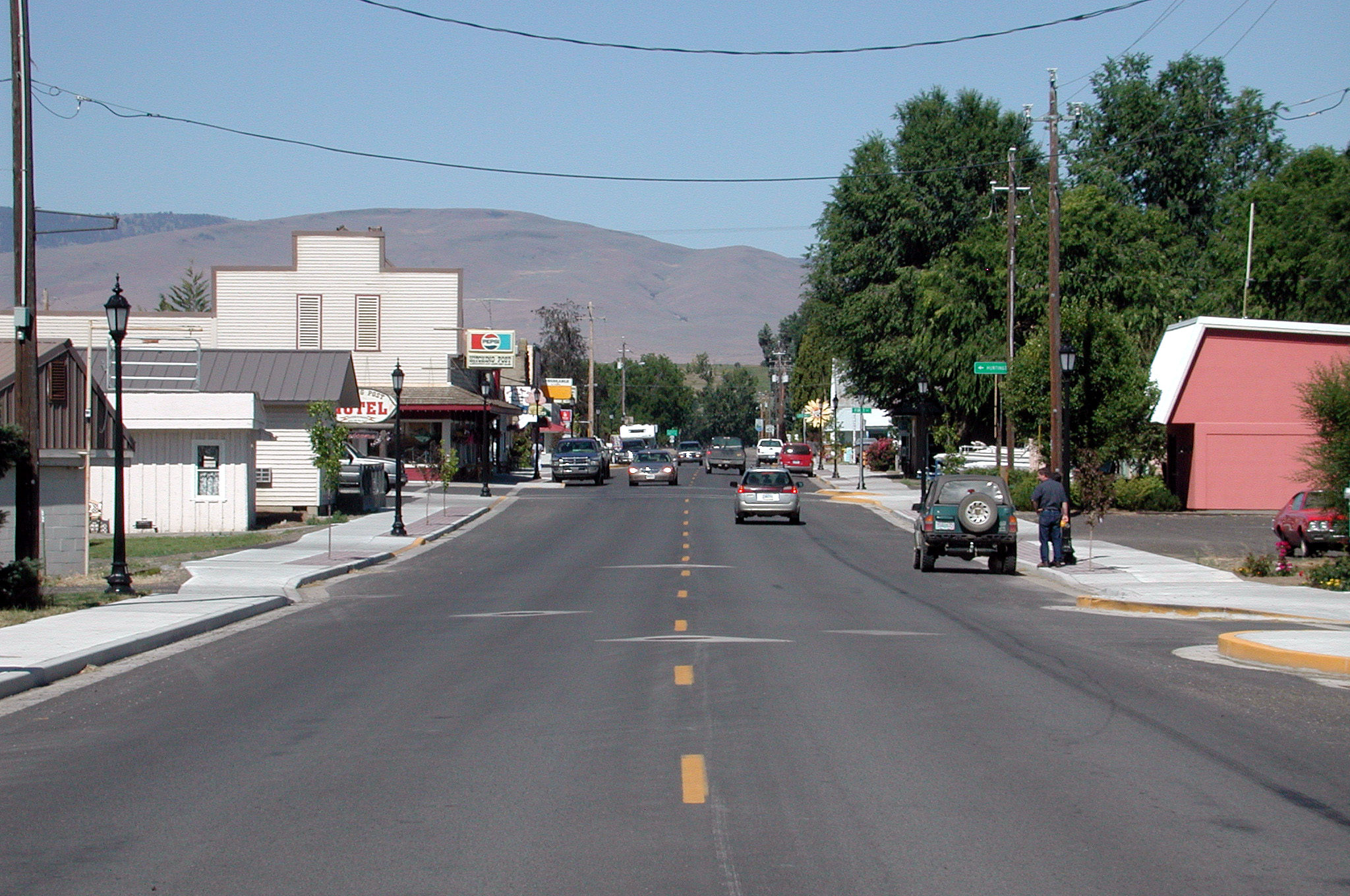
- Main Street

- Location in Oregon
- Coordinates: 44°46′04″N 117°10′07″W
- Country: United States
- State: Oregon
- County: Baker
- Incorporated: 1917

Area
  - Total: 0.10 sq mi (0.27 km^{2})
  - Land: 0.10 sq mi (0.27 km^{2})
  - Water: 0 sq mi (0.00 km^{2})
- Elevation: 2,211 ft (674 m)

Population (2020)
  - Total: 165
  - Density: 1,564.1/sq mi (603.89/km^{2})
- Time zone: UTC-8 (Pacific)
  - Summer (DST): UTC-7 (Pacific)
- ZIP code: 97870
- Area code: 541
- FIPS code: 41-61700
- GNIS feature ID: 2410936

Richland is a city in Baker County, Oregon, United States. The population was 165 at the 2020 census.

== History ==
Richland was platted in 1897 and replaced New Bridge as the primary rural service center in the area.

== Geography ==
Richland is along Oregon Route 86 between Baker City and Oxbow on the Oregon–Idaho border.

According to the United States Census Bureau, the city has a total area of 0.08 square miles (0.21 km^{2}), all of it land.

=== Climate ===
According to the Köppen Climate Classification system, Richland has a dry, hot summer humid continental climate, abbreviated "Dsa" on climate maps.

Climate data for Richland
Month	Jan	Feb	Mar	Apr	May	Jun	Jul	Aug	Sep	Oct	Nov	Dec	Year
Record high °F (°C)	62 (17)	76 (24)	85 (29)	92 (33)	98 (37)	105 (41)	111 (44)	109 (43)	105 (41)	92 (33)	78 (26)	65 (18)	111 (44)
Mean daily maximum °F (°C)	38.1 (3.4)	45.7 (7.6)	55.2 (12.9)	65.4 (18.6)	74.1 (23.4)	82.4 (28.0)	92.3 (33.5)	91.2 (32.9)	81.4 (27.4)	68 (20)	50.7 (10.4)	40.4 (4.7)	65.4 (18.6)
Mean daily minimum °F (°C)	19.7 (−6.8)	24.5 (−4.2)	28.8 (−1.8)	33.5 (0.8)	40.6 (4.8)	47.1 (8.4)	52.8 (11.6)	50.7 (10.4)	42 (6)	33.1 (0.6)	26.6 (−3.0)	21.9 (−5.6)	35.1 (1.7)
Record low °F (°C)	−27 (−33)	−26 (−32)	−9 (−23)	13 (−11)	12 (−11)	19 (−7)	25 (−4)	31 (−1)	18 (−8)	6 (−14)	−7 (−22)	−22 (−30)	−27 (−33)
Average precipitation inches (mm)	1.27 (32)	0.85 (22)	0.81 (21)	0.9 (23)	1.33 (34)	1.03 (26)	0.39 (9.9)	0.54 (14)	0.54 (14)	0.72 (18)	1.27 (32)	1.3 (33)	10.95 (278)
Average snowfall inches (cm)	6.4 (16)	2.7 (6.9)	0.7 (1.8)	0.2 (0.51)	0 (0)	0 (0)	0 (0)	0 (0)	0 (0)	0.1 (0.25)	2.1 (5.3)	5.1 (13)	17.4 (44)
Average precipitation days	7	5	5	5	6	5	2	3	3	5	7	7	60

== Demographics ==
Historical population
Census	Pop.	Note	%±
1910	334		—
1920	244		−26.9%
1930	212		−13.1%
1940	254		19.8%
1950	220		−13.4%
1960	228		3.6%
1970	133		−41.7%
1980	181		36.1%
1990	161		−11.0%
2000	147		−8.7%
2010	156		6.1%
2020	165		5.8%
U.S. Decennial Census

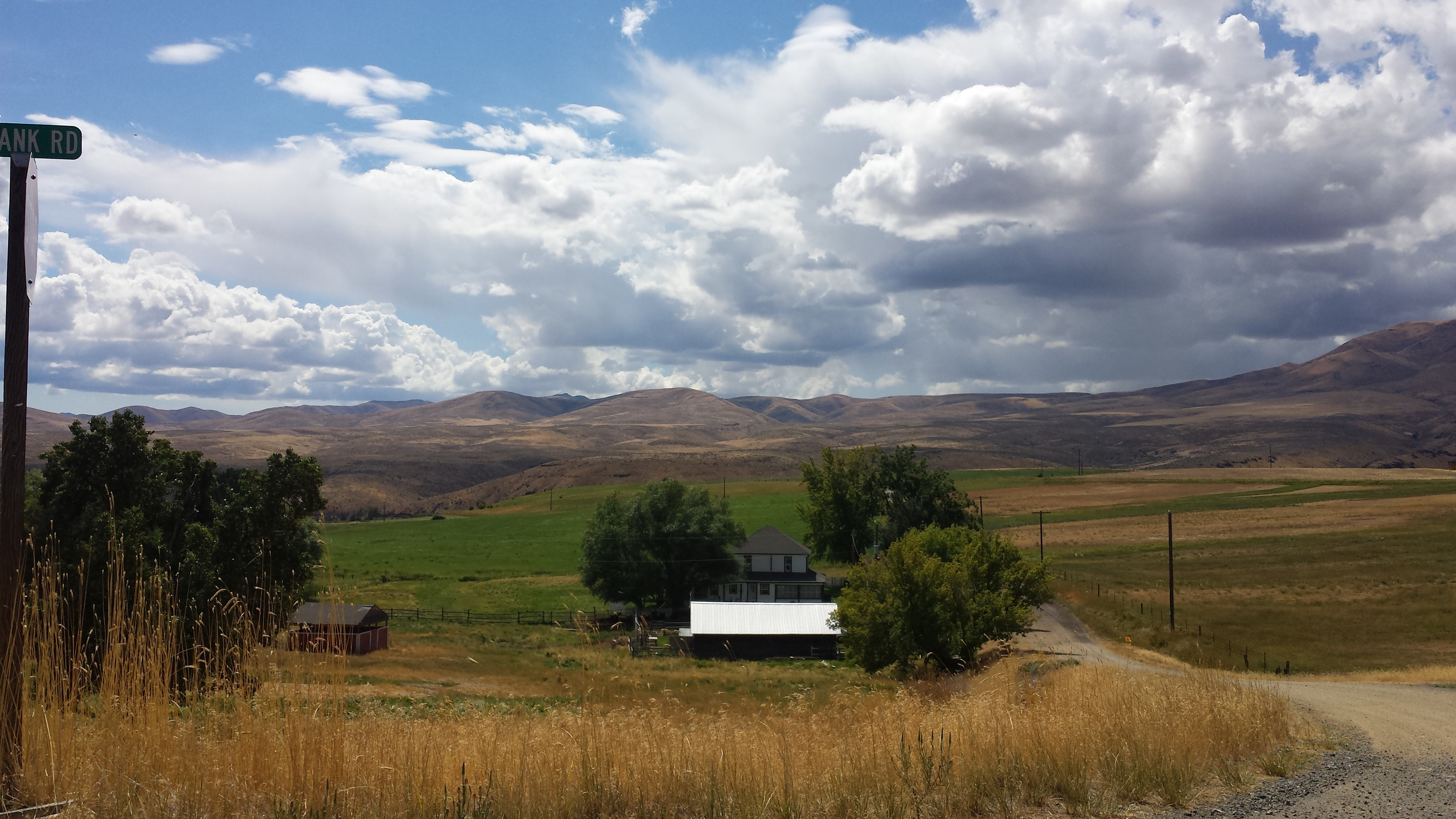
Big Lookout Mountain Range outside the city of Richland

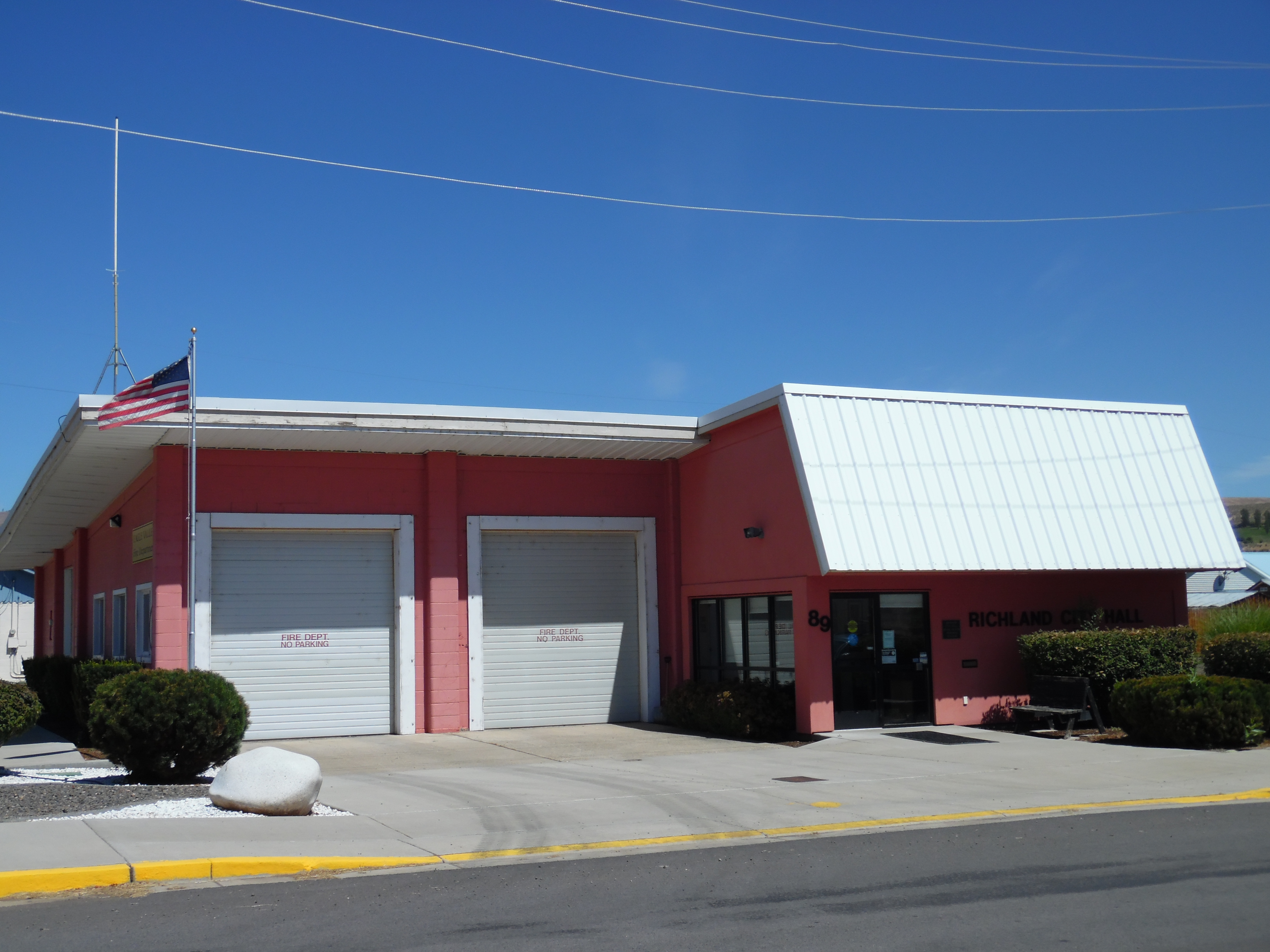
Richland city hall-fire station

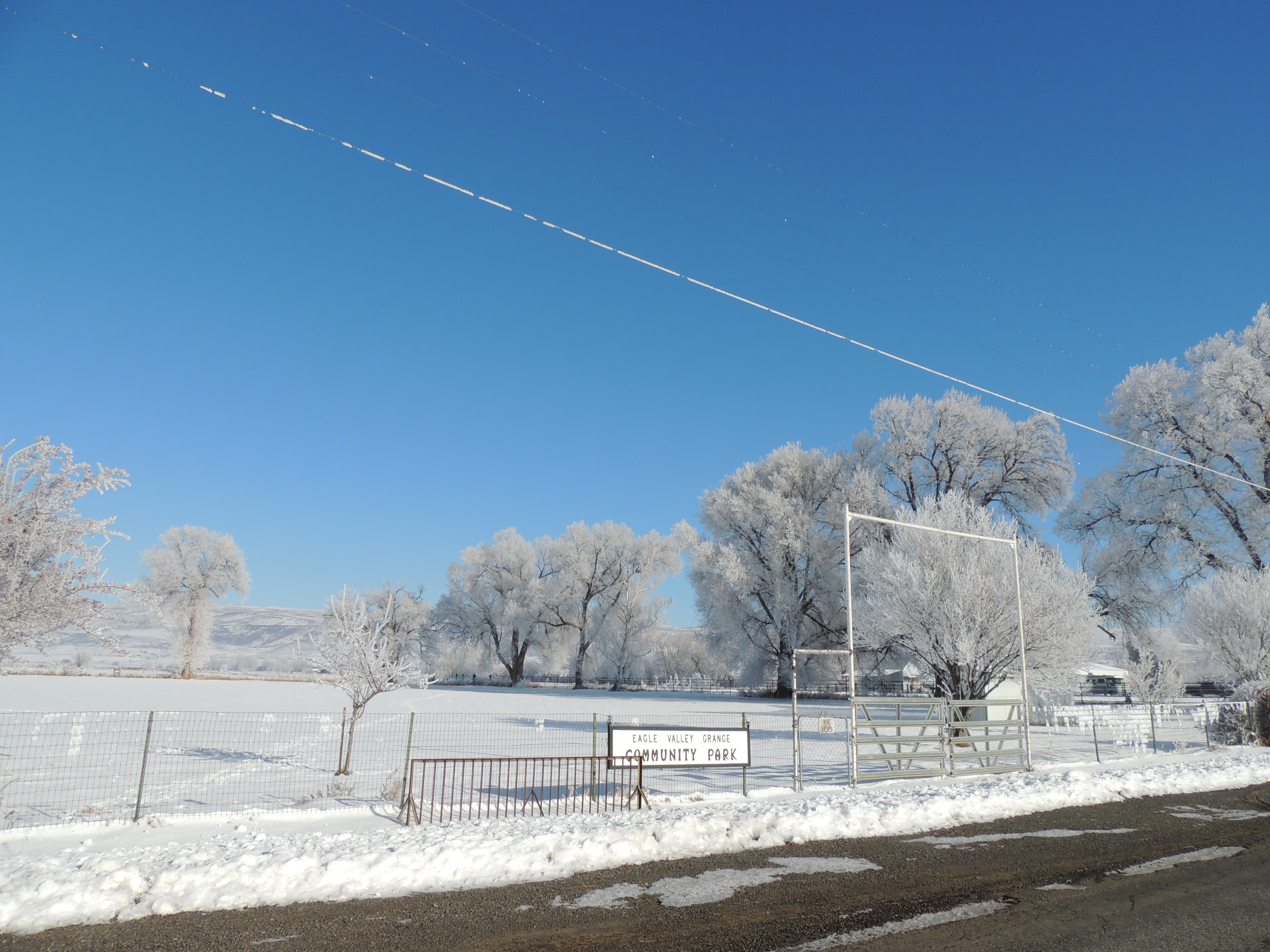
Eagle Valley Community Park in Richland

=== 2020 census ===
As of the 2020 census, Richland had a population of 165. The median age was 64.5 years. 17.6% of residents were under the age of 18 and 49.7% of residents were 65 years of age or older. For every 100 females there were 98.8 males, and for every 100 females age 18 and over there were 83.8 males age 18 and over.

0% of residents lived in urban areas, while 100.0% lived in rural areas.

There were 83 households in Richland, of which 22.9% had children under the age of 18 living in them. Of all households, 32.5% were married-couple households, 21.7% were households with a male householder and no spouse or partner present, and 36.1% were households with a female householder and no spouse or partner present. About 37.4% of all households were made up of individuals and 21.7% had someone living alone who was 65 years of age or older.

There were 119 housing units, of which 30.3% were vacant. Among occupied housing units, 73.5% were owner-occupied and 26.5% were renter-occupied. The homeowner vacancy rate was 4.5% and the rental vacancy rate was 21.4%.

Racial composition as of the 2020 census
Race	Number	Percent
White	152	92.1%
Black or African American	0	0%
American Indian and Alaska Native	0	0%
Asian	0	0%
Native Hawaiian and Other Pacific Islander	2	1.2%
Some other race	0	0%
Two or more races	11	6.7%
Hispanic or Latino (of any race)	2	1.2%

=== 2010 census ===
As of the census of 2010, there were 156 people, 93 households, and 46 families living in the city. The population density was 1,950.0 inhabitants per square mile (752.9/km^{2}). There were 116 housing units at an average density of 1,450.0 per square mile (559.8/km^{2}). The racial makeup of the city was 94.9% White, 1.3% African American, 1.3% Native American, and 2.6% from two or more races. No people from Richland reported as Asian or Hispanic or Latino of any race.

There were 93 households, of which 2.2% had children under the age of 18 living with them, 48.4% were married couples living together, 1.1% had a female householder with no husband present, and 50.5% were non-families. 38.7% of all households were made up of individuals, and 23.6% had someone living alone who was 65 years of age or older. The average household size was 1.68 and the average family size was 2.11.

The median age in the city was 64.4 years. 1.9% of residents were under the age of 18; 2.4% were between the ages of 18 and 24; 7% were from 25 to 44; 40.4% were from 45 to 64; and 48.1% were 65 years of age or older. The gender makeup of the city was 50.6% male and 49.4% female.

=== 2000 census ===
As of the census of 2000, there were 147 people, 86 households, and 41 families living in the city. The population density was 1,849.1 inhabitants per square mile (713.9/km^{2}). There were 121 housing units at an average density of 1,522.0 per square mile (587.6/km^{2}). The racial makeup of the city was 97.28% White, 0.68% Native American, 0.68% Asian, and 1.36% from two or more races. Hispanic or Latino of any race were 0.68% of the population.

There were 86 households, out of which 7.0% had children under the age of 18 living with them, 41.9% were married couples living together, 5.8% had a female householder with no husband present, and 51.2% were non-families. 45.3% of all households were made up of individuals, and 29.1% had someone living alone who was 65 years of age or older. The average household size was 1.71 and the average family size was 2.31.

In the city, the population was spread out, with 8.2% under the age of 18, 1.4% from 18 to 24, 8.8% from 25 to 44, 35.4% from 45 to 64, and 46.3% who were 65 years of age or older. The median age was 63 years. For every 100 females, there were 93.4 males. For every 100 females age 18 and over, there were 98.5 males.

The median income for a household in the city was $17,344, and the median income for a family was $27,500. Males had a median income of $25,000 versus $19,688 for females. The per capita income for the city was $13,462. There were 11.4% of families and 18.4% of the population living below the poverty line, including 37.5% of under eighteens and 13.0% of those over 64.
