= Jimtown, Oregon =

Unincorporated community in the state of Oregon, United States

- Unincorporated community
- Location within Oregon Location within the United States
- Coordinates: 44.905°N 117.145°W
- Country: United States
- State: Oregon
- County: Baker
- Elevation: 2,930 ft (890 m)
- Time zone: UTC-8 (Pacific (PST))
  - Summer (DST): UTC-7 (PDT)
- ZIP code: 97834
- Area codes: 458 and 541

Jimtown is an unincorporated community in Baker County, Oregon, United States. It is about two miles northwest of Halfway, on Oregon Route 413.

Jimtown was originally named Langrell, after early resident Richard T. Langrell, a sawmill owner who opened a store in the community in 1904. In 1910 Langrell sold the store to James H. Chandler, who ran it until 1916. He is the "Jim" for whom the town was renamed. Jimtown became the official name in a 1987 United States Board on Geographic Names decision.
