= Irene Kopelman =

Argentine-Dutch artist (born 1974)

Irene Kopelman (born 1974, Córdoba, Argentina) is an Argentine-Dutch artist based in Amsterdam. Her works explore the relationship between science and art.

== Works ==
Kopelman's work marries the clinical distance of scientific observation with an almost spiritual reverence for landscape and the objects, large and small, that comprise it. It is built on the long-term engagement with ecological issues and the parallels between both science and art. The subject matter is a close visual engagement, questioning and exploring how drawing can approach these topics. Her work forms knowledge through the image and the process to make the image about the environment. They also embody the methodologies and systems we use to generate the knowledge and make it visible, creating her own systems of representation through artworks.

== Awards ==
Kopelman won first prize in the 2016–2017 Medifé Arte y Medioambiente Foundation Biennial for her project, "Drawing Camp".

== Exhibitions ==
Date	Exhibition
October 11 - December 13, 2014	Roma Publications 1998 - 2014, Giuliani Foundation, Rome, Italy
April 1 - May 9, 2015	A Journal of the Plague Year, Kadist Art Fouondation, San Francisco, CA, USA
November 6, 2015 - January 15, 2016	Irene Kopelman: On Glaciers and Avalanches, Labor, Mexico City, Mexico
May 13 - June 20, 2016	Artist in the Field, The Drawing Room, New York, US
August 25 - October 28, 2017	A Line Between the Morning Sun and the Evening Sun: Anniversary Exhibition, 10 Years of Häusler Contemporary Zürich, Häusler Contemporary, Zürich, Switzerland
August 30 - November 26, 2017	A Materiality of the Invisible, Marres, House for the Contemporary Culture, Maastericht, Netherlands
December 13, 2017 - February 17, 2018	Irene Kopelman: Indexing Water, Kunsthalle Lissabon, Lisbon, Portugal
March 8 - July 23, 2018	Irene Kopelman: Puntos Cardinales, Fundación Malba, Buenos Aires, Argentina
May 6 - August 26, 2018	Irene Kopelman, Center for Contemporary Art, Rotterdam, Netherlands
June 23 - October 6, 2018	Works from the Fundación Botin Collection, Centro Botin, Santander, Spain
June 23, 2018 - January 13, 2019	The Landscape Reconfigured, Centro Botin, Santander, Spain
April 4 - June 5, 2019	Irene Kopelman: Cardinal Points, Labor, Mexico City, Mexico
June 23- September 15, 2019	The Reconfigured Landscape, Centro Botin, Santander, Spain
September 12 - October 21, 2020	Le Plan Libre, 1st Chapter, Galerie Jocelyn Wolff, Paris, France
August 18, 2020 - February 14, 2021	Colección Jumex: Savage Topology, Museo Jumex, Danta Maria Tulpeltac, Mexico City, Mexico
March 14 - May 19, 2021	Irene Kopelman: Quaternary Unfolded, Galerie Jocelyn Wolff, Paris, France
