= Richard Kopelman =

American academic

Richard E. Kopelman
- Occupations: Management scholar, academic and researcher
- Children: Josh Kopelman

Academic background
- Education: B.S. M.B.A. D.B.A.
- Alma mater: University of Pennsylvania; Harvard University
- Thesis: "Expectancy Theory Predictions of Work Motivation and Job Performance: A Longitudinal Study of Engineers Across Three Companies" (1974)

Academic work
- Institutions: Baruch College, City University of New York

Richard E. Kopelman is an American academic, researcher and a management scholar. He is a Professor of Management at the City University of New York’s Baruch College.

Kopelman has published over 150 research papers, chapters and professional articles on work motivation, productivity, careers, organizational performance, and human resource management. He recently completed a 20-year project whereby he conceptualized, validated, and developed instrumentation for the Cube One Framework. Kopelman is the author of Improving Organizational Performance: The Cube One Framework (Routledge, 2020) and previously, Managing Productivity in Organizations: A Practical, People Oriented Perspective (McGraw-Hill, 1986).

== Education ==
Kopelman completed his bachelor’s and master’s degrees at the Wharton School of the University of Pennsylvania in Philadelphia in 1965 and 1967, respectively. He received his doctoral degree from Harvard University’s Graduate School of Business Administration in Cambridge, Massachusetts in 1974.

== Career ==
Kopelman joined Baruch College of the City University of New York in 1973 as an Instructor of Management and was promoted to Assistant Professor in the following year. He was promoted to Associate Professor in 1978 and was appointed as a tenured Professor of Management in 1981. Kopelman has also served as a Consultant in Management Training at the Center for Advanced Study in Education (CASE) and is the President of Cube One, Inc.

== Research ==
Kopelman’s research has focused on improving work motivation, productivity, organizational performance, and human resource management. Most recently, he has conceptualized, operationalized, and validated the Cube One Framework.

=== Organizational performance ===
Kopelman has conducted extensive research on the improvement of organizational performance. He has investigated the effects of objective feedback, merit pay, job redesign, performance appraisal format, organizational structure, and alternative work schedules on job performance and productivity.

Kopelman conducted a prominent study of the effects of executive coaching in a public sector municipal agency and found that executive coaching resulted in a significantly higher increase in worker productivity in comparison to traditional training. He conducted a longitudinal and multilevel study to investigate the relationships between a newly developed construct—Perceived Organizational and Family Support (POFS)--with organizational commitment, work-family conflict, and job search behavior.

Kopelman also co-authored the initial research that provided construct validity evidence for another new measure, the Job Search Behavior Index (JSBI). Kopelman and colleagues have co-authored four articles and a chapter that yielded the development of a construct valid measure of Douglas McGregor's Theory X and Theory Y. After 60 years and several studies that failed to find support for McGregor’s seminal theorizing, in 2015, he published an article demonstrating the validity of Theory X/Y as predictors of individual and group performance. The keys to finding support rested on distinguishing between X/Y attitudes and X/Y behaviors; conducting a multilevel, multi-source analysis; and using hierarchical linear modeling to examine the performance effects of McGregor’s theorizing at individual and workgroup levels.

=== Construct validity research ===
Kopelman has conducted applied construct validity studies with regard to several projects. In the 1980s, he pioneered in developing a measure of work-family conflict. He developed and validated a measure of job search behaviors (the Job search Behavior Index) that was substantially superior in predicting employee turnover in comparison to the widely used measures of intention to remain and intention to leave.

Kopelman contributed to updating the Study of Values. The updated version substituted more current exemplars of value orientations (e.g., Bill Gates in place of Henry Ford) and used identical items for male and female respondents. He and his colleagues also published several studies pertinent to the construct validity of four measures of narcissism; they also found relationships to the performance and satisfaction of salespeople.

=== Cube One Framework ===
Kopelman has conceptualized and conducted extensive research on the Cube One Framework, which holds that successful organizations are need-satisfying places. More specifically, organizational performance is related to the frequency of the enactment of enterprise-, customer- and employee-directed practices. Organizations that enact High levels of all three sets of practices are in Cube One; organizations with Low levels of the three sets of practices are in Cube 27.

== Awards and honors ==
- 1972-1973 - William B. Harding Fellowship, Harvard Business School
- 1980 - Outstanding Contributed Paper, American Institute for Decision Sciences
- 1987 - Presidential Award for Excellence in Teaching, Baruch College
- 1989, 1991, 1992, 1993 - Teaching Excellence Award, School of Business and Public Administration, Baruch College
- 1999 - Award for Overall Excellence in Research, Service, and Teaching, City University of New York
- 2000 - Lifetime Achievement Award, American Compensation Association
- 2005 - Presidential Award for Excellence in Scholarship, Baruch College

== Bibliography ==
=== Books ===
- Managing Productivity in Organizations: A Practical, People Oriented Perspective (1986) ISBN 978-0070353299
- Improving Organizational Performance: The Cube One Framework (2019) ISBN 978-1138951747

=== Selected articles ===
- Kopelman, Richard E.; Greenhaus, Jeffrey H.; Connolly, Thomas F. (October 1983). "A model of work, family, and interrole conflict: A construct validation study". Organizational Behavior and Human Performance. 32 (2): 198–215. doi:10.1016/0030-5073(83)90147-2.
- Kopelman, R. E., Brief, A. P., & Guzzo, R. A. (1990). The role of climate and culture in productivity. Organizational climate and culture, 282, 318.
- Olivero, Gerald; Bane, K. Denise; Kopelman, Richard E. (December 1997). "Executive Coaching as a Transfer of Training Tool: Effects on Productivity in a Public Agency". Public Personnel Management. 26 (4): 461–469. doi:10.1177/009102609702600403.
- Thompson, Cynthia A.; Jahn, Eileen White; Kopelman, Richard E.; Prottas, David J. (2004). "Perceived Organizational Family Support: A Longitudinal and Multilevel Analysis". Journal of Managerial Issues. 16 (4): 545–565. JSTOR 40604468.
- Greenhaus, J. H., & Kopelman, R. E. (1981). Conflict between work and nonwork roles: Implications for the career planning process. Human Resource Planning, 4(1), 1-10.
