= Carson, Oregon =

Unincorporated community in the state of Oregon, United States

- Unincorporated community
- Location within Oregon Location within the United States
- Coordinates: 44°56′09″N 117°10′32″W
- Country: United States
- State: Oregon
- County: Baker
- Elevation: 3,366 ft (1,026 m)
- Time zone: UTC-8 (Pacific (PST))
  - Summer (DST): UTC-7 (PDT)
- Area codes: 458 and 541
- GNIS feature ID: 1139396

Carson is an unincorporated community in Baker County, in the U.S. state of Oregon, along Oregon Route 413 about 5 miles (8 km) northwest of Halfway. In 1870 Tom Corson settled in the area on a tributary of Pine Creek. His neighbors pronounced his name "Carson" and named the tributary and a sawmill on the creek after him. When the post office was established in 1893, it was named "Carson" as well. The town was platted in 1900, the first in Pine Valley. The platted area was small even by northeastern standards: 12 blocks. Carson lost out as a rural service center to the nearby Langrell.

In 1940 Carson had a population of 90. The post office closed in 1952.
