= Upstart Holdings =

American financial technology company

Upstart Holdings, Inc.

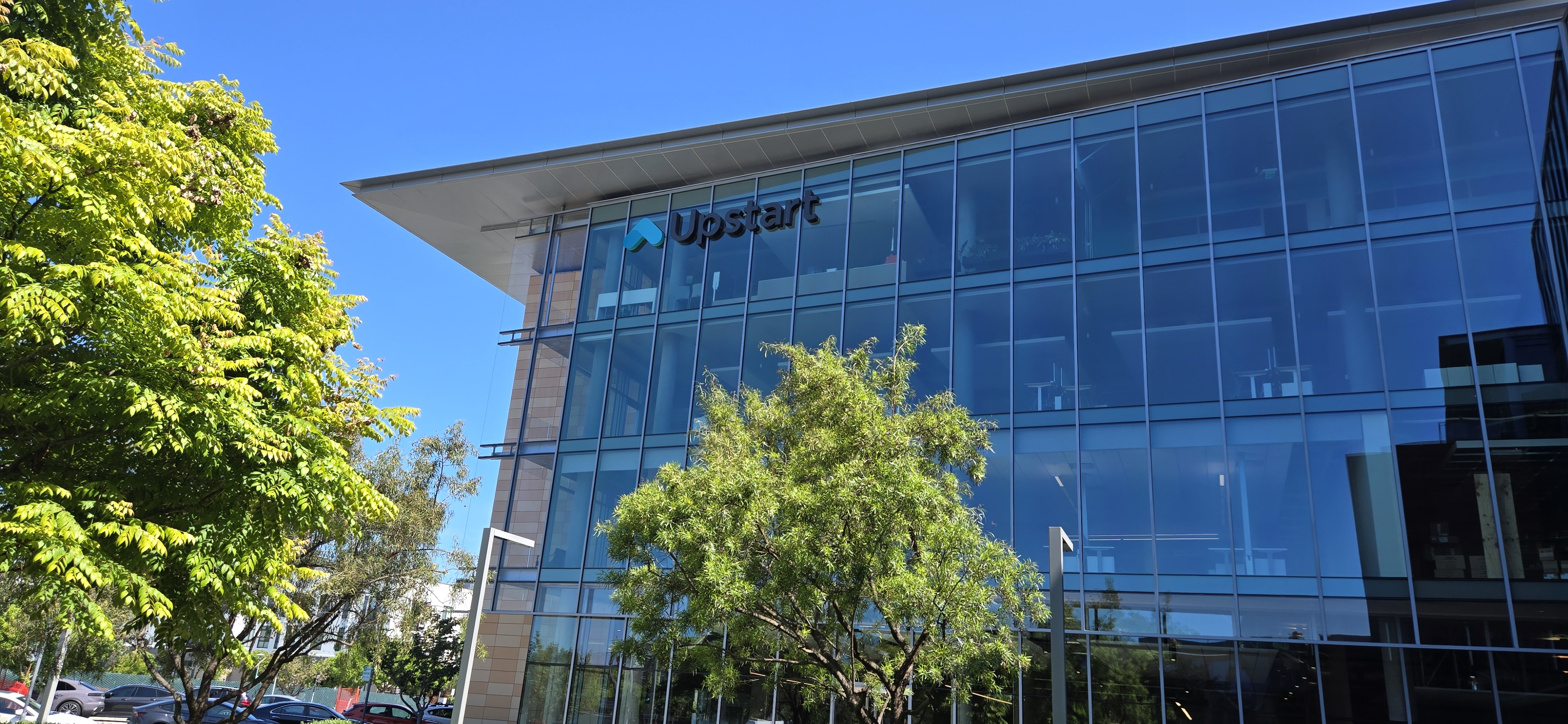
- Upstart's headquarters in San Mateo, California
- Type: Public
- Traded as: Nasdaq: UPST; Russell 2000 component
- Industry: Financial technology
- Founded: April 2012; 14 years ago
- Founders: Dave Girouard; Anna Counselman; Paul Gu
- Headquarters: San Mateo, California, U.S.
- Area served: United States
- Revenue: ▲US$842 million (2024)
- Operating income: ▲US$−114 million (2024)
- Net income: ▲US$−109 million (2024)
- Total assets: ▲US$2.37 billion (2024)
- Total equity: ▼US$633 million (2024)
- Number of employees: 1,193 (2024)
- Website: upstart.com

Upstart is a lending platform based in San Mateo, California. It was first launched in April 2012 with an Income Share Agreement (ISA) product, which enabled individuals to raise money by contracting to share a percent of their future income. In May 2014, Upstart pivoted away from this product and toward the personal loan marketplace. With this pivot, Upstart began offering a traditional 3-year loan, and has since expanded to offer a 5-year loan product as well.

Upstart developed an income and default prediction model to determine creditworthiness of a potential borrower. This means that in addition to traditional underwriting criteria—FICO score, credit report, and income—the Upstart underwriting considers education variables—colleges attended, area of study, GPA, and standardized test scores—and work history to develop a statistical model of the borrower's financial capacity and personal propensity to repay.

Upstart raised a $1.75M seed round from First Round Capital, Kleiner Perkins Caufield & Byers, New Enterprise Associates, Google Ventures, Crunchfund and Mark Cuban. They subsequently raised a series A round of $5.9M which included new investors Eric Schmidt (Google Executive Chairman), Marc Benioff, Khosla Ventures, Correlation Ventures, Founders Fund, and Collaborative Fund. Upstart raised a Series C round of $35M from Third Point Capital in June 2015, and $32.5M from Rakuten in 2017. Upstart raised a Series D round of $50M from the Progressive Corporation in 2019.

In late 2020, Upstart went public via an initial public offering.

== See also ==
- SoFi
- Lending Club
