= Lee Koppelman =

American urban planner (1928–2022)

- Born: August 19, 1927
- Died: March 21, 2022 (aged 94); New York, U.S.
- Education: City College of New York; Pratt Institute; New York University
- Occupation: Urban planner

Lee Edward Koppelman (August 19, 1927 – March 21, 2022) was an American urban planner, based on Long Island.

Koppelman was active in public service through the 1960s until his May 2006 resignation from the Long Island Regional Planning Board, and continued as director of State University of New York at Stony Brook's Center for Regional Policy Studies.

Koppelman was an important figure in the campaign for sustainability on Long Island and one of the first to subscribe to the idea of preserving space in the interest of health and future generations. His planning theories hinged on the notion of balance and equity, as well as embracement of the best technological tools available at the time. His work was inspired by his early readings of Lewis Mumford.

Aside from his contributions to the field of urban planning, Koppelman's major research was generally concerned with the environmental policy aspects of regional planning as well as the principles of coastal zone management. He was project manager over almost $20 million in directed research on coastal regional planning, comprehensive water management, shoreline erosion practices. and related studies. In addition to the development of legislation related to coastal zone management and the design of administrative mechanisms for policy implementation, he was involved with the development of synthesis techniques for relating coastal zone science into the regional planning process.

== Early life and education ==
In 1950, Koppelman received a degree in electrical engineering from the City College of New York, followed by a MA in planning from the Pratt Institute and a PhD in public administration from New York University.

== Career ==
Koppelman drew up influential Master Plans for Long Island in 1969–70. However, some of their most ambitious features remained "on the drawing board" – such as (1) an "instant city" to be constructed in the general vicinity of the Long Island Expressway's Exit 68 (William Floyd Parkway intersection, near Yaphank; (2) a major commercial airport serving the New York City market, to be located at the site of an existing military airfield, either at Calverton or Westhampton; (3) at least one bridge across the Long Island Sound, and (4) a new North Shore parkway running parallel to the Long Island Expressway in Suffolk County. (Source: Articles by Karl Grossman in the Long Island Press, 1969 and 1970, not available online.)

The first three were revived, and presented to the public as brand-new proposals, by the Long Island development lobby between 1988 and 1992. The "instant city", proposed anew by developer Wilbur Breslin, became a sprawling 2,100-acre (8 km^{2}) mixed-use dream, nicknamed "WillyWorld", dominated by a giant shopping mall. A proposal for an air freight facility at the US Navy / Grumman property in Calverton, and a high-speed ferry between Wading River and New Haven, Connecticut, were described in L.I. Business News and Newsday editorials, respectively, as first steps towards the long-awaited major passenger jetport and cross-Sound bridge, both vehemently opposed by "NIMBY" groups since they were first advocated by Koppelman and others circa 1969. As of early 2006, these projects all remain in the proposal stage. (Dozens of articles on each "new" proposal in Newsday online archives, especially 1989–1994.)

Although primarily identified, in the public mind, with the schemes of the "development lobby", Koppelman has also played a leading role in preserving open space, particularly in the parklands purchased by Suffolk County around 1970. Research supervised by Koppelman identified road run-off ("non-point-source pollution") as the leading cause of deteriorating water quality in local aquifers and estuaries, indicating an urgent need to limit the amount of paved-over area in coastal environments. In the early 1990s, he publicly opposed the "WillyWorld" shopping mall proposal, on the grounds that enough other similar projects were already in the works. In general, Koppelman's environmental initiatives left a lasting legacy, while his major development proposals went nowhere, or were overwhelmed by the chaotic clutter of suburban sprawl.

Often when he reflected on his career to students and media, Koppelman stated that the lack of affordable housing in the region was his biggest regret and failure.

Koppelman is the author, with Joseph De Chiara, of standard texts on planning, widely used in graduate schools: Urban Planning and Design Criteria (Van Nostrand Reinhold, 1982), and Site Planning Standards (McGraw Hill Co., 1978). Rep. Steve Israel (D-NY) nominated Koppelman for a Presidential Medal of Freedom in 2004. Koppelman also served as a professor in Stony Brook University's graduate program in Public Policy.

In early September 2021, Koppelman suffered a stroke while teaching a lecture class at Stony Brook University and was hospitalized shortly after. He died on 21 March 2022, at the age 94.
