= Cornucopia, Oregon =

Cornucopia
- Ghost town
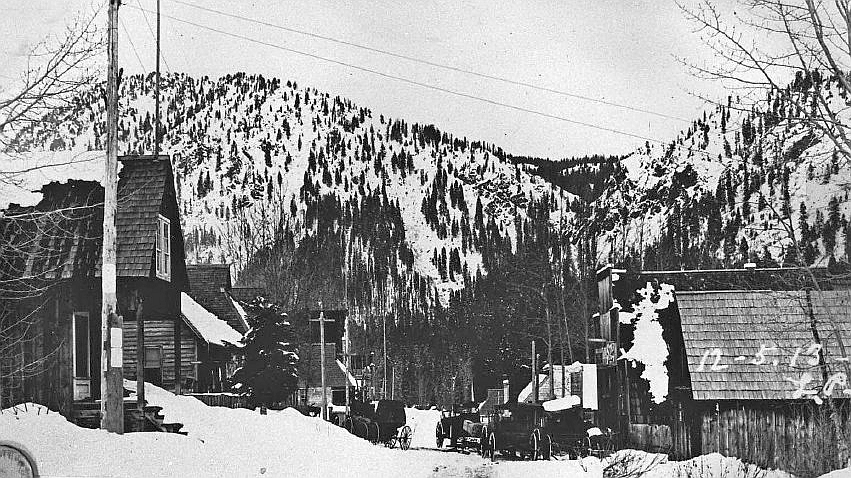
- Cornucopia 1913

- Location in Oregon
- Country: United States
- State: Oregon
- County: Baker
- Elevation: 4,741 ft (1,445 m)
- Time zone: Pacific

Cornucopia is a ghost town built during the gold mining boom of the 1880s in Eastern Oregon, United States. The town was officially platted in 1886 and was a mining town with various levels of success until it was abandoned in 1942. It is now primarily a tourist attraction as a ghost town. It is located east of Baker City high in the mountains of Pine Valley almost due north of Halfway, Oregon, on Oregon Route 86.

== History ==
In 1884 a man by the name Lon Simmons discovered gold on the far east edge of Oregon. By July 1885 there were at least 500 men living in the area, forming a town that became known as Cornucopia, meaning horn of plenty. The town continued to grow as it generated wealth. The primary mining companies were Last Chance, Queen of the West, Union-Companion, and the Red Jacket. In 1902 the Oregon Daily Journal claimed that "the Cornucopia group of gold mines contains what is probably the largest ore body in the Pacific Northwest, if not in the United States". Around the same time there were up to 700 men working for the mining company Cornucopia Mines of Oregon, making it the sixth-largest mining operation in the United States. However, the mixture of old equipment and horses being the only form of transportation greatly hindered the town's success. In the same year, for unknown reasons, the mining companies neglected to pay a collective $40,122 engineering bill. This caused foreclosure proceedings and affected the mine's success until the claim was settled on February 7, 1905, allowing the mine to grow again.

There were large gold strikes in both November 1915 and towards the end of 1921, which kept the town booming. Technological advances such as electricity, pneumatic drills, and the railroad expanding to be along the Snake River all occurred in early 1922. These advances combined with the late 1921 gold strike allowed a massive mill to be constructed. This mill was considered a twenty-stamp mill, meaning it had twenty giant hammers used to crush ore, and could produce 60 tons of ore each day. This crushed ore was then put through a chemical treatment that extracted the gold.

However, the Wall Street Crash of 1929 caused mining to be halted and the population to drop precipitously. By 1930 the census recorded a population of only 10. By 1934 the mines were processing gold once again. By 1938 the mining company was profitable, making $100,000.00 in September (Equivalent to $1,734,212.77 in April 2017). The mines continued to grow, and Cornucopia was responsible for 66% of the gold in Oregon in 1939. The census in 1940 recorded 352 residents and the mines were the 7th largest in the nation. However, in the beginning of 1942 President Franklin D. Roosevelt closed all gold mining operations in America so that miners could focus on producing metals for war. The town was abandoned and never recovered. Over the course of its inhabitation, approximately $18 million worth of precious metals was extracted from the mines.

=== Culture ===
Cornucopia's isolation required the residents to provide their own entertainment. Many people in the town learned to play instruments such as fiddle, piano, and drums. Miners worked 10-hour days, while in later times mill workers worked 12 hours a day, both working seven days a week. Because of the constant work, holidays were very important to the townsfolk. The most important ones were Christmas and the Fourth of July. Labor Day was also celebrated with a town picnic which was accompanied by contests, such as tug-of-war. At the peak of its existence, Cornucopia had multiple general stores, a boardinghouse, saloons, a hotel, a post office, and a school.

== Geography ==
Cornucopia is located in Baker County, north of Carson, Oregon, immediately southeast of Cornucopia Peak, and west of Snake River. The nearest City is Baker City, OR (56 mi driving South West). Cornucopia has multiple creeks within close proximity, including Pine Creek, Elk Creek, and Panter Creek with East Fork Falls as short distance north. The region is mountainous and full of fir trees. Due to Cornucopia's elevation (4,741 ft), the region receives high snowfall during the winter months. Cornucopia sits on the Southern border of the Eagle Cap Wilderness in the Wallowa Mountains. The gold mines are located north-west of the town center.

Cornucopia is only accessible from the South along the Cornucopia Highway, beginning in Halfway, Oregon. The Cornucopia Highway is the main road connecting Halfway, Jimtown, and Carson, Oregon along the valley before entering Cornucopia 5.5 miles after Carson, Oregon.

== Climate ==
Climate data for Cornucopia, Oregon (351852) (based on data collected from 07/01/1909 to 10/31/1972)
Month	Jan	Feb	Mar	Apr	May	Jun	Jul	Aug	Sep	Oct	Nov	Dec	Year
Average precipitation inches (mm)	6.73 (171)	5.36 (136)	4.52 (115)	3.19 (81)	2.62 (67)	2.27 (58)	0.65 (17)	0.92 (23)	1.56 (40)	2.87 (73)	5.94 (151)	6.55 (166)	43.2 (1,100)
Average snowfall inches (cm)	70.6 (179)	46.0 (117)	27.5 (70)	10.2 (26)	1.2 (3.0)	0.2 (0.51)	0 (0)	0 (0)	0.2 (0.51)	4.7 (12)	28.7 (73)	55.5 (141)	244.8 (622.02)
Source: The Western Regional Climate Center

== Tourism ==
Cornucopia has become a tourist attraction in Oregon due to its reputation as a ghost town and due to deaths that have occurred there. In response to the growing popularity of the town, the Cornucopia Lodge was built in 2008.

This is no longer a tourist attraction. People actually live here. Difficult to find. Only thing left standing that the town acknowledged from that period is the jail.

There is a hotel there that offers horse back riding

== See also ==
- Cornucopia Jailhouse
- List of ghost towns in Oregon
