= Infonautics =

Information services company

Infonautics, Inc.
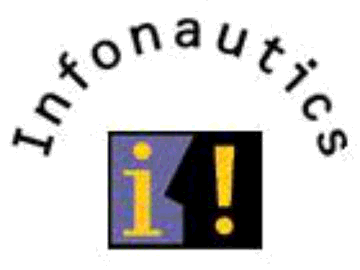
- Infonautics Company Logo
- Type: Public
- Traded as: Nasdaq: INFO
- Industry: Internet Services
- Founded: 1992; 34 years ago
- Defunct: August 28, 2001; 25 years ago
- Fate: Acquired by Tucows
- Headquarters: Wayne, Pennsylvania, US
- Products: Digital Library

Infonautics, Inc. was an information services company, founded in 1992 by Marvin Weinberger, Lawrence Husick, and Josh Kopelman, and had its headquarters in Wayne, Pennsylvania, United States. It was a spin-out from Telebase, Inc., which retained a minority position in the company. The company's executives included Van Morris (CEO), Ram Mohan (COO/CTO), Frederica O'Brien (CFO), and Gerard Lewis (General Counsel). Israel J. Melman was also a co-founder, a mentor to Marvin Weinberger and served on the boards of both Telebase and Infonautics, where he was also Chairman of the Board.

== History ==
In 1990, Telebase founder Weinberger and outside counsel Husick conceived of Homework Helper, a $10 per month unlimited research service having a large multimedia database and a natural language user interface. Working with Brewster Kahle, a protocol was developed to run on the Thinking Machines massively parallel computer system, but in late early 1991, Conquest Software demonstrated its semantic search engine and a change in direction ensued. Hardware support was provided by Tandem Computers. Early work on the multimedia database system yielded multiple U.S. patents.

In 1996, the company was listed on the Nasdaq stock exchange. It was delisted in 2001.

In 2001, Tucows acquired Infonautics through a business tactic called "reverse takeover". Initially, Infonautics purchased Tucows and then changed its own name to Tucows. On August 26, 2002, Tucows sold eLibrary and Encyclopedia.com to HighBeam Research.

The company created online services Homework Helper on Prodigy, Encyclopedia.com, Electric Library, and CompanySleuth.

In 2003, The Philadelphia Inquirer reported that the company was "one of the first Internet companies in the Philadelphia area"
