= Oxbow, Oregon =

Unincorporated community in the state of Oregon, United States

Oxbow
- unincorporated community
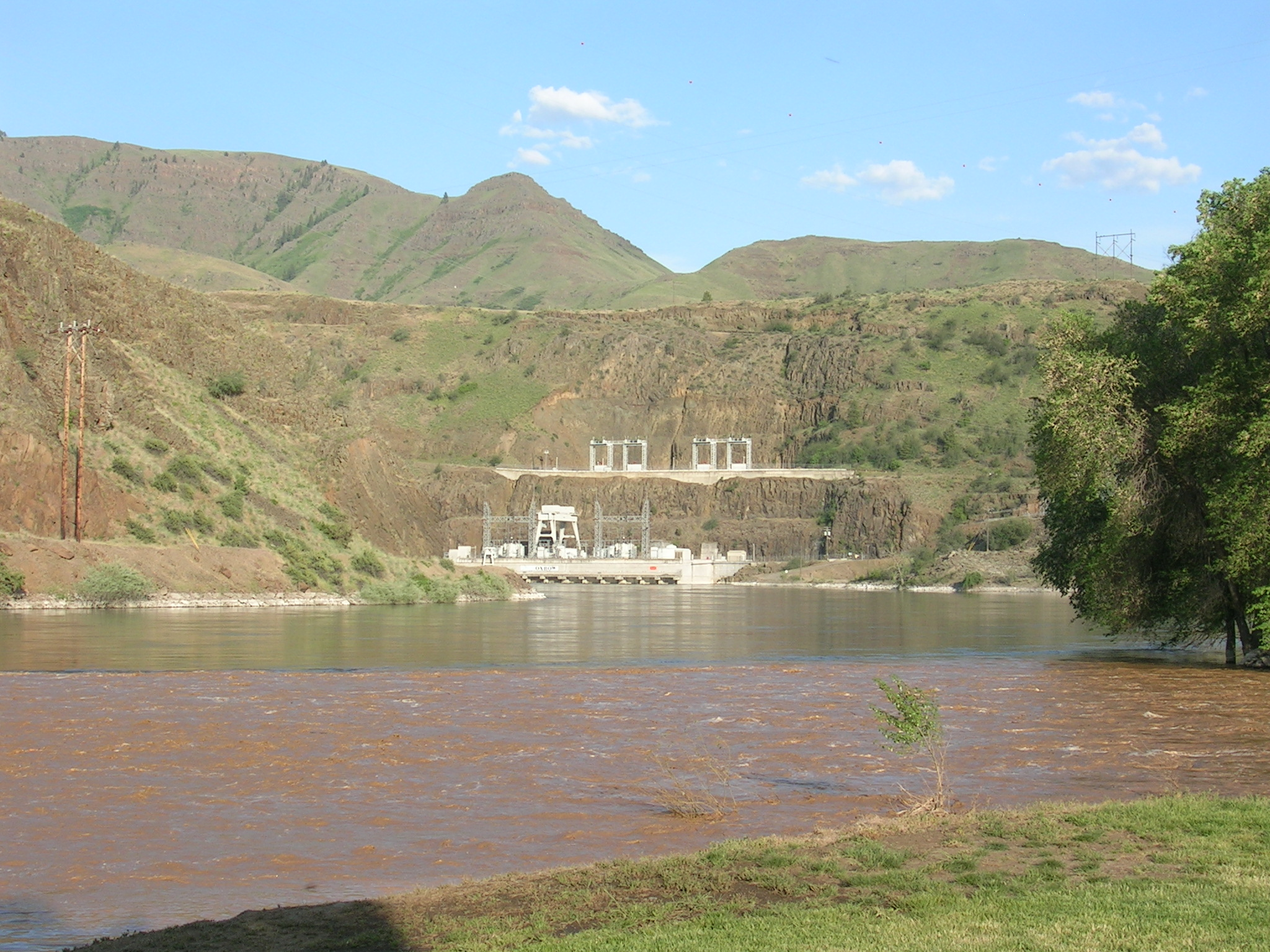
- The Oxbow Dam

- Location within the state of Oregon
- Coordinates: 44.9748786°N 116.8629359°W
- Country: United States
- State: Oregon
- County: Baker
- Elevation: 1,982 ft (604 m)
- Time zone: UTC-7 (Mountain; de facto); UTC-8 Pacific (de jure)
  - Summer (DST): UTC-6 (MDT)
- ZIP code: 97840
- Area codes: 541 and 458
- GNIS feature ID: 1167700

Oxbow is an unincorporated community in Baker County, Oregon, United States. Oxbow is along Oregon Route 86 next to the Snake River near the Oxbow Dam on the Oregon-Idaho border, about 17 miles (27 km) northeast of Halfway. Oxbow is just south of the site of the former mining town of Copperfield. Oxbow has a post office with a ZIP code 97840.

There was once a station named Oxbow on a portion of the Oregon Short Line Railroad now inundated by Oxbow Reservoir. It was named for The Oxbow, a U-shaped bend in the Snake River named for the agricultural implement. The present-day community of Oxbow was established in the early 1960s near the former site of Copperfield during the building of the Oxbow Dam by the Idaho Power Company. Oxbow post office was established on May 1, 1965, after moving the office from Homestead six miles to the north. At one time, Oxbow had a school.

== Climate ==
This region experiences warm (but not hot) and dry summers, with no average monthly temperatures above 71.6 °F (22 °C). According to the Köppen Climate Classification system, Oxbow has a warm-summer Mediterranean climate, abbreviated "Csb" on climate maps.
