= Halfway, Oregon =

City in Oregon, United States

- City
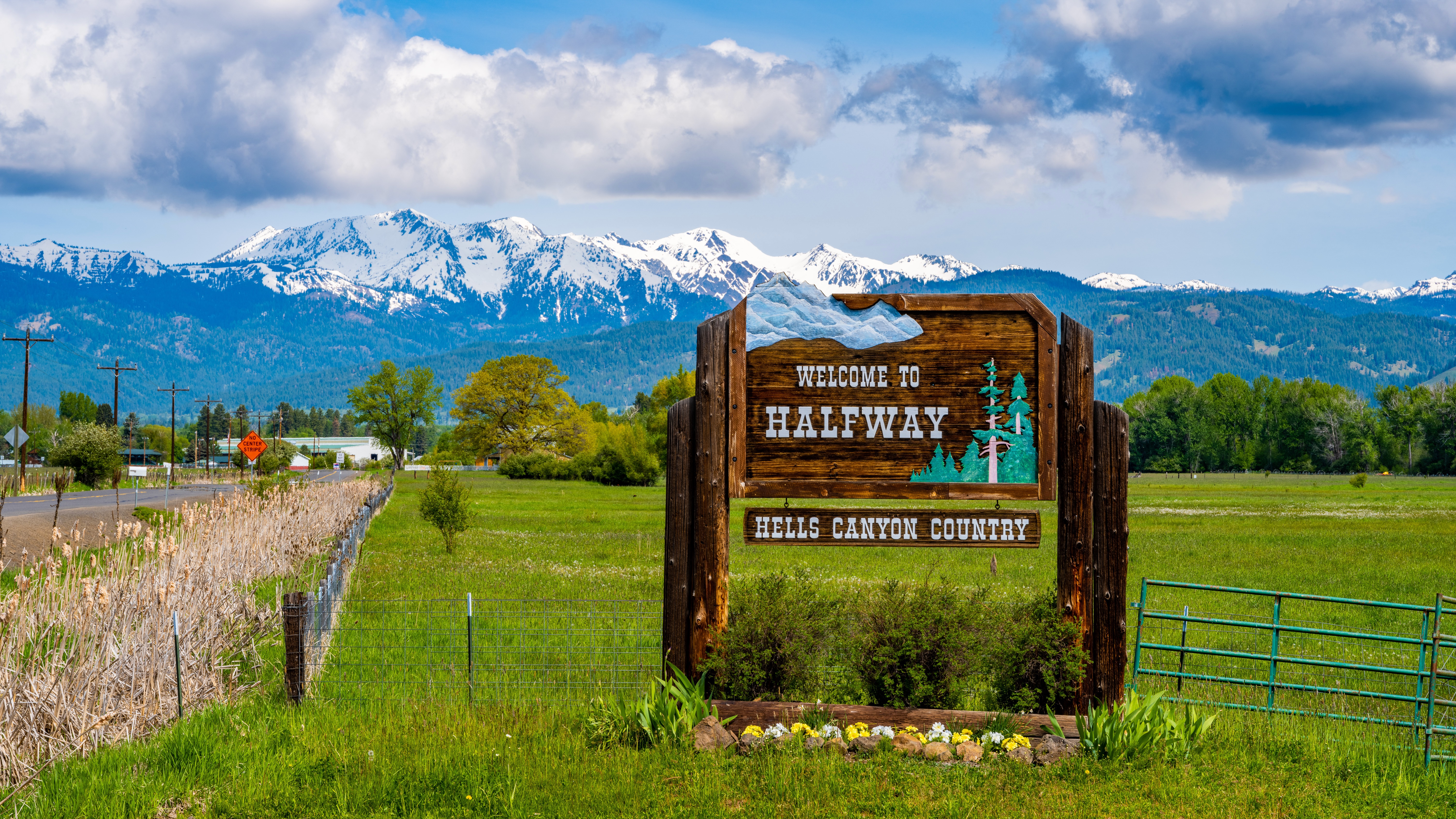
- Welcome sign, in the background are the Wallowa Mountains

- Logo

- Location in Oregon
- Coordinates: 44°52′40″N 117°06′34″W
- Country: United States
- State: Oregon
- County: Baker
- Incorporated: 1909

Government
  - Mayor: Nora Aspy

Area
  - Total: 0.37 sq mi (0.96 km^{2})
  - Land: 0.37 sq mi (0.96 km^{2})
  - Water: 0 sq mi (0.00 km^{2})
- Elevation: 2,651 ft (808 m)

Population (2020)
  - Total: 351
  - Density: 942.5/sq mi (363.89/km^{2})
- Time zone: UTC-8 (Pacific)
  - Summer (DST): UTC-7 (Pacific)
- ZIP code: 97834
- Area codes: 458 and 541
- FIPS code: 41-31650
- GNIS feature ID: 2410686
- Website: www.halfwayoregon.org

Halfway is a city in Baker County, Oregon, United States. The city took its name from the location of its post office, on the Alexander Stalker ranch, halfway between Pine and Jim Town. The population was 351 at the 2020 census.

During the dot-com bubble, Halfway agreed to rename itself Half.com for a year as a publicity stunt for the e-commerce company of the same name.

== History ==
The community was named for the fact it is roughly halfway between Pine and Cornucopia. While a post office was established in 1887, the town was platted in another location in 1907, the post office moved there in 1908, and it incorporated in 1909.

=== Half.com name change ===
Halfway earned a place in the history of the dot-com era in December 1999, when it received and accepted an offer to rename itself as Half.com, after the e-commerce start-up, for one year in exchange for US$110,000, 20 computers for the school, and other financial subsidies. It became the first city in the world to rename itself as a dot com. Among the less obvious reasons the town was chosen were its small population size (and thus its likelihood to accept such an offer) and the city's location, which fit perfectly into Half.com's marketing scheme. "They're within four miles of the 45th parallel which makes it halfway between the equator and the North Pole". The proclamation did not legally change its name. The city created and posted two signs at its borders that greeted visitors with "America's First Dot-com City". The city auctioned one of these off in September 2007 for US$1,000; the winner was Half.com's founder Josh Kopelman.

== Geography ==
Halfway is located 54 miles (87 km) east of Baker City, along Oregon Route 86, halfway between Pine and Cornucopia, which gave the town its name. The city's geographic coordinates of 44°52′42″N 117°6′38″W (making it close to the midpoint between the equator and the North Pole) were part of the reason for Half.com to choose the town for its advertising gimmick.

According to the United States Census Bureau, the city has a total area of 0.37 square miles (0.96 km^{2}), all of it land.

== Climate ==
According to the Köppen climate classification system, Halfway has a dry-summer humid continental climate (Köppen Dsb).

Climate data for Halfway, Oregon, 1991–2020 normals, extremes 1936–present
| Month | Jan | Feb | Mar | Apr | May | Jun | Jul | Aug | Sep | Oct | Nov | Dec | Year |
|---|---|---|---|---|---|---|---|---|---|---|---|---|---|
| Record high °F (°C) | 57 (14) | 66 (19) | 78 (26) | 92 (33) | 96 (36) | 106 (41) | 110 (43) | 108 (42) | 104 (40) | 91 (33) | 71 (22) | 61 (16) | 110 (43) |
| Mean maximum °F (°C) | 44.9 (7.2) | 51.2 (10.7) | 67.6 (19.8) | 79.4 (26.3) | 87.9 (31.1) | 94.6 (34.8) | 100.5 (38.1) | 99.4 (37.4) | 93.8 (34.3) | 79.9 (26.6) | 61.7 (16.5) | 47.4 (8.6) | 101.4 (38.6) |
| Mean daily maximum °F (°C) | 31.8 (−0.1) | 38.7 (3.7) | 51.3 (10.7) | 61.6 (16.4) | 71.2 (21.8) | 78.9 (26.1) | 89.6 (32.0) | 88.6 (31.4) | 78.8 (26.0) | 62.6 (17.0) | 45.3 (7.4) | 33.0 (0.6) | 61.0 (16.1) |
| Daily mean °F (°C) | 25.4 (−3.7) | 30.4 (−0.9) | 40.6 (4.8) | 47.9 (8.8) | 56.1 (13.4) | 62.8 (17.1) | 70.8 (21.6) | 69.3 (20.7) | 60.5 (15.8) | 48.0 (8.9) | 36.1 (2.3) | 26.6 (−3.0) | 47.9 (8.8) |
| Mean daily minimum °F (°C) | 19.1 (−7.2) | 22.1 (−5.5) | 30.0 (−1.1) | 34.3 (1.3) | 41.0 (5.0) | 46.7 (8.2) | 52.1 (11.2) | 49.9 (9.9) | 42.2 (5.7) | 33.4 (0.8) | 27.0 (−2.8) | 20.3 (−6.5) | 34.8 (1.6) |
| Mean minimum °F (°C) | −4.1 (−20.1) | 1.6 (−16.9) | 13.8 (−10.1) | 20.2 (−6.6) | 24.9 (−3.9) | 33.8 (1.0) | 39.8 (4.3) | 38.0 (3.3) | 28.4 (−2.0) | 18.6 (−7.4) | 10.1 (−12.2) | −0.5 (−18.1) | −9.7 (−23.2) |
| Record low °F (°C) | −34 (−37) | −33 (−36) | −8 (−22) | 9 (−13) | 18 (−8) | 26 (−3) | 30 (−1) | 28 (−2) | 18 (−8) | 4 (−16) | −23 (−31) | −31 (−35) | −34 (−37) |
| Average precipitation inches (mm) | 3.57 (91) | 2.08 (53) | 1.85 (47) | 1.55 (39) | 1.78 (45) | 1.31 (33) | 0.48 (12) | 0.32 (8.1) | 0.68 (17) | 1.31 (33) | 2.56 (65) | 3.78 (96) | 21.27 (539.1) |
| Average snowfall inches (cm) | 22.8 (58) | 9.3 (24) | 2.0 (5.1) | 0.3 (0.76) | 0.0 (0.0) | 0.0 (0.0) | 0.0 (0.0) | 0.0 (0.0) | 0.0 (0.0) | 0.0 (0.0) | 6.3 (16) | 21.6 (55) | 62.3 (158.86) |
| Average precipitation days (≥ 0.01 in) | 12.5 | 10.1 | 10.0 | 9.9 | 8.9 | 7.1 | 2.9 | 3.1 | 4.0 | 6.4 | 10.9 | 12.7 | 98.5 |
| Average snowy days (≥ 0.1 in) | 7.2 | 3.6 | 0.7 | 0.2 | 0.0 | 0.0 | 0.0 | 0.0 | 0.0 | 0.0 | 2.2 | 6.9 | 20.8 |
Source 1: NOAA
Source 2: National Weather Service

== Demographics ==
Historical population
| Census | Pop. | Note | %± |
|---|---|---|---|
| 1910 | 186 | | — |
| 1920 | 324 | | 74.2% |
| 1930 | 351 | | 8.3% |
| 1940 | 416 | | 18.5% |
| 1950 | 312 | | −25.0% |
| 1960 | 505 | | 61.9% |
| 1970 | 317 | | −37.2% |
| 1980 | 380 | | 19.9% |
| 1990 | 311 | | −18.2% |
| 2000 | 339 | | 9.0% |
| 2010 | 288 | | −15.0% |
| 2020 | 351 | | 21.9% |
U.S. Decennial Census

=== 2020 census ===
As of the 2020 census, there were 351 people living in Halfway, Oregon. The median age was 48.2 years, with 22.8% of residents under the age of 18 and 29.1% aged 65 or older. For every 100 females there were 99.4 males, and for every 100 females age 18 and over there were 93.6 males age 18 and over.

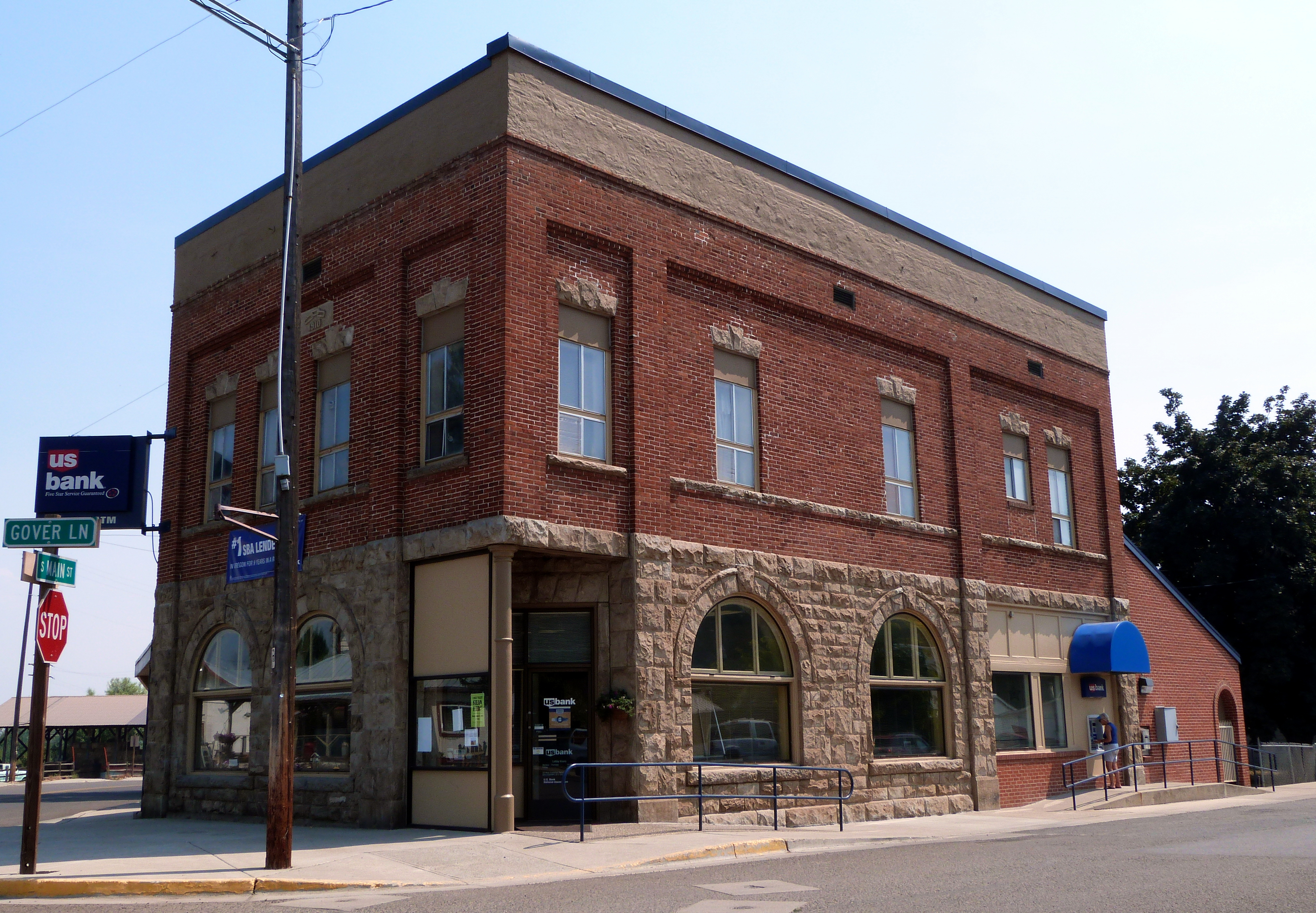
US Bank building in Downtown Halfway on the corner of Main Street and Grove Lane

0% of residents lived in urban areas, while 100.0% lived in rural areas.

There were 166 households in Halfway, of which 24.1% had children under the age of 18 living in them. Of all households, 37.3% were married-couple households, 27.1% were households with a male householder and no spouse or partner present, and 29.5% were households with a female householder and no spouse or partner present. About 42.8% of all households were made up of individuals and 23.5% had someone living alone who was 65 years of age or older.

There were 203 housing units, of which 18.2% were vacant. Among occupied housing units, 68.7% were owner-occupied and 31.3% were renter-occupied. The homeowner vacancy rate was <0.1% and the rental vacancy rate was 8.6%.

The median household income was $39,083 with an employment rate of 45.7%. 12.4% of residents held a bachelor's degree or higher.

Racial composition as of the 2020 census
| Race | Number | Percent |
|---|---|---|
| White | 309 | 88.0% |
| Black or African American | 0 | 0% |
| American Indian and Alaska Native | 4 | 1.1% |
| Asian | 0 | 0% |
| Native Hawaiian and Other Pacific Islander | 0 | 0% |
| Some other race | 9 | 2.6% |
| Two or more races | 29 | 8.3% |
| Hispanic or Latino (of any race) | 18 | 5.1% |

=== 2010 Census ===
As of the census of 2010, there were 288 people, 153 households, and 76 families residing in the city. The population density was 778.4 inhabitants per square mile (300.5/km^{2}). There were 199 housing units at an average density of 537.8 per square mile (207.6/km^{2}). The racial makeup of the city was 94.1% White, 1.7% Native American, 0.7% Asian, 0.3% Pacific Islander, 1.4% from other races, and 1.7% from two or more races. Hispanic or Latino of any race were 3.5% of the population.

There were 153 households, of which 19.0% had children under the age of 18 living with them, 38.6% were married couples living together, 10.5% had a female householder with no husband present, 0.7% had a male householder with no wife present, and 50.3% were non-families. 46.4% of all households were made up of individuals, and 19% had someone living alone who was 65 years of age or older. The average household size was 1.88 and the average family size was 2.63.

The median age in the city was 52.7 years. 17.7% of residents were under the age of 18; 6.2% were between the ages of 18 and 24; 11.7% were from 25 to 44; 41% were from 45 to 64; and 23.3% were 65 years of age or older. The gender makeup of the city was 46.9% male and 53.1% female.

=== 2000 Census ===
As of the census of 2000, there were 337 people, 159 households, and 86 families residing in the city. The population density was 789.5 inhabitants per square mile (304.8/km^{2}). There were 196 housing units at an average density of 459.1 per square mile (177.3/km^{2}). The racial makeup of the city was 95.25% White, 2.97% Native American, 0.30% from other races, and 1.48% from two or more races. Hispanic or Latino of any race were 2.08% of the population.

There were 159 households, out of which 24.5% had children under the age of 18 living with them, 43.4% were married couples living together, 9.4% had a female householder with no husband present, and 45.3% were non-families. 39.6% of all households were made up of individuals, and 24.5% had someone living alone who was 65 years of age or older. The average household size was 2.12 and the average family size was 2.91.

In the city, the population was spread out, with 25.2% under the age of 18, 4.5% from 18 to 24, 20.5% from 25 to 44, 26.1% from 45 to 64, and 23.7% who were 65 years of age or older. The median age was 45 years. For every 100 females, there were 86.2 males. For every 100 females age 18 and over, there were 81.3 males.

The median income for a household in the city was $17,212, and the median income for a family was $27,813. Males had a median income of $23,750 versus $13,194 for females. The per capita income for the city was $12,997. About 24.5% of families and 28.3% of the population were below the poverty line, including 40.2% of those under age 18 and 29.5% of those age 65 or over.

== Economy ==
In 2017, the three largest employers in Halfway were the Pine Eagle School District, the Idaho Power Company, and the U.S. Forest Service, which combined to employ over 125 people.

== Notable people ==
- Babette Beatty, the first Sports Illustrated Swimsuit Issue cover model
- Barnaby Keeney, former president of Brown University
- Robert S. Summers, professor at Cornell Law School
