= Brownlee =

Brownlee may refer to:

== People ==
- Brownlee (surname)

== Places ==
- Brownlee Dam
- Brownlee, Nebraska
- Brownlee, Oregon
- Brownlee Park, Michigan
- Brownlee, Saskatchewan
- Robert Brownlee Observatory
