= List of plants endemic to Hells Canyon =

Because of the Snake River's geographical isolation there are a number of plants that have evolved in Hells Canyon that grow nowhere else on earth. Though some species are more widespread, the specific varieties of the species are not.

== List of plants endemic to Hells Canyon ==
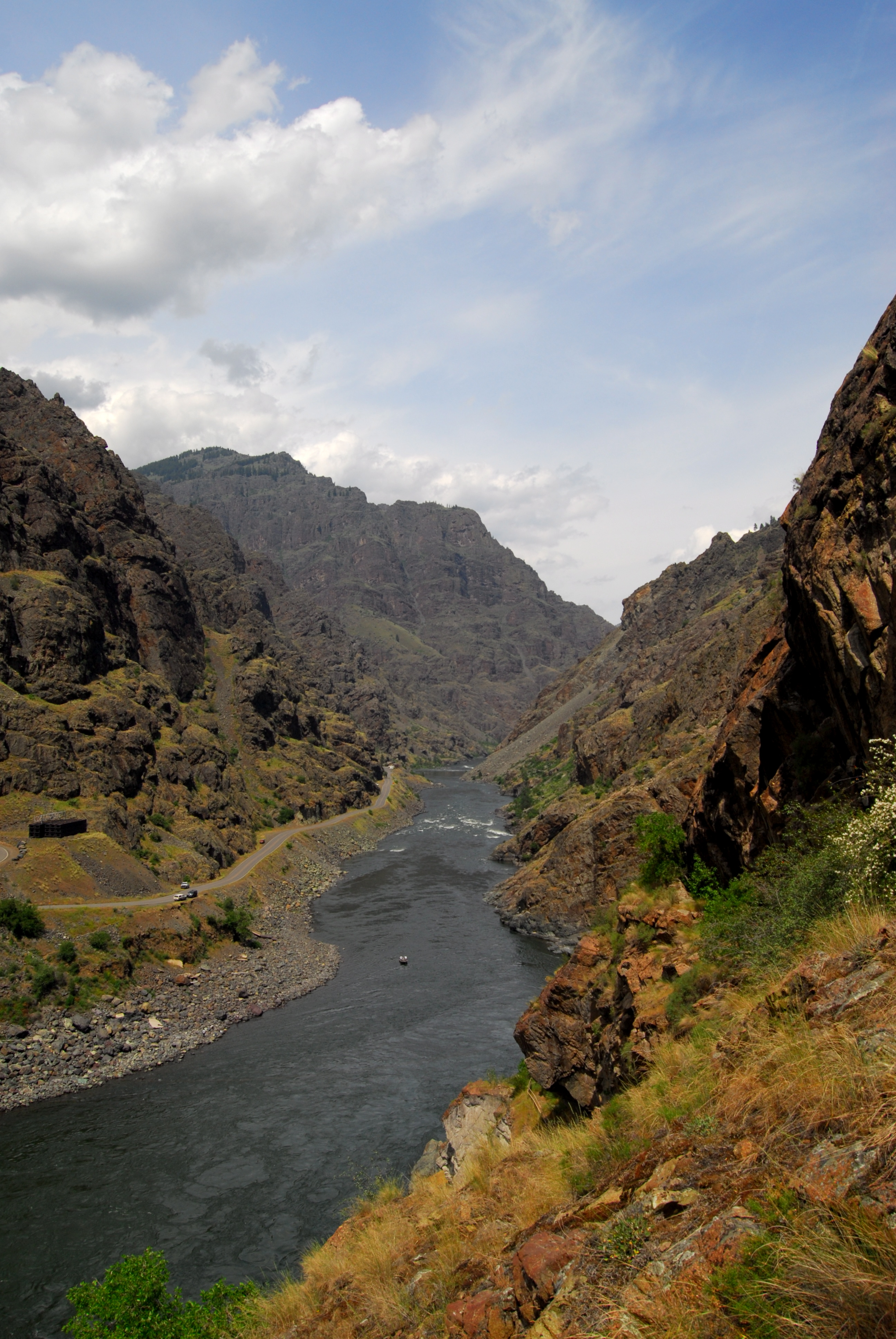
Hells Canyon

- Arabis crucisetosa Constance and Rollins
- Boechera hastatula Greene
- Astragalus arthurii M.E.Jones
- Astragalus vallaris M.E.Jones
- Calochortus macrocarpus var. maculosus (A.Nels. & J.F.Macbr.) A.Nels. & J.F.Macbr.
- Erythranthe hymenophylla R.J. Meinke
- Lomatium rollinsii Mathias and Constance
- Lomatium serpentinum (M.E.Jones) Mathias
- Phlox colubrina Wherry and Constance
- Ribes cereum var. colubrinum C.L.Hitchc.
- Rubus bartonianus M.E.Peck
