= Erythranthe hymenophylla =

Conservation status
- Imperiled (NatureServe)

Scientific classification
- Kingdom: Plantae
- Clade: Embryophytes
- Clade: Tracheophytes
- Clade: Angiosperms
- Clade: Eudicots
- Clade: Asterids
- Order: Lamiales
- Family: Phrymaceae
- Genus: Erythranthe
- Species: E. hymenophylla

Binomial name
- Erythranthe hymenophylla (Meinke) G.L.Nesom

Synonyms
- Mimulus hymenophyllus Meinke

Species of flowering plant

Erythranthe hymenophylla, synonym Mimulus hymenophyllus, is a species of flowering plant in the lopseed family known by the common names thinsepal monkeyflower and membrane-leaf monkeyflower. It is native to Hells Canyon on the border between Oregon and Idaho in the United States. It has also been reported from Montana.

This plant is a perennial herb producing masses of thin, fragile, winged stems up to 25 centimeters long. They are coated in glandular hairs with a slimy exudate. The leaves are oppositely arranged in pairs. They are lance-shaped to oval with pointed tips and are very thin, nearly membrane-like. Flowers are borne in pairs in the leaf axils. Each has a tube-shaped calyx of green sepals. The corolla is funnel-shaped and variable in size, up to 2.8 centimeters in length. It is yellow with some red or purple dots inside, and it has a beard of yellow hairs on the lower lip. Flowering occurs in April through September.

This plant grows on wet spots in cracks in basalt and limestone cliffs alongside ferns and bryophytes. They are usually above flowing water in streams and rivers. Other plants in the habitat include oceanspray (Holodiscus discolor), snowberry (Symphoricarpos albus), creeping mahonia (Berberis repens), desert gooseberry (Ribes velutinum), golden currant (Ribes aureum), Wilcox penstemon (Penstemon wilcoxii), whorled penstemon (Penstemon triphyllus), floerkea (Floerkea proserpinacoides), Leiberg stonecrop (Sedum leibergii), cutleaf thelypody (Thelypodium laciniatum), brittle bladderfern (Cystopteris fragilis), and common monkeyflower (Erythranthe guttata).
