= Brownlee, Oregon =

Unincorporated community in the state of Oregon, United States

- Unincorporated community
- Location within Oregon Location within the United States
- Coordinates: 44°48′42″N 116°56′04″W
- Country: United States
- State: Oregon
- County: Baker
- Elevation: 2,264 ft (690 m)
- Time zone: UTC-8 (Pacific (PST))
  - Summer (DST): UTC-7 (PDT)
- Area codes: 458 and 541
- GNIS feature ID: 1133435

Brownlee is an unincorporated community in Baker County, Oregon, United States.

John Brownlee started a ferry service that crossed the Snake River between Idaho and Oregon and became known as Brownlee's Ferry. When a railroad was built on the Oregon side of the river, the station at the ferry crossing was named Brownlee. Brownlee post office ran intermittently from 1910 to 1965. The portion of the tracks that ran between Homestead and Robinette and passed through Brownlee were torn up by the railway's final owners, Oregon Short Line, in 1934.

== See also ==
- Brownlee Dam
- Goodale's Cutoff
- Historic ferries in Oregon
