= Vivian Tomlinson Williams =

American musician (1938–2023)

- Born: Vivian Tomlinson; May 28, 1938
- Died: January 6, 2023 (aged 84)
- Education: University of Washington; Reed College
- Occupation: Composer
- Years active: Phil Williams (19??-2017; his death)

Vivian Williams (née Tomlinson; May 27, 1938 – January 6, 2023) was an American fiddler, composer, recording artist, and writer. She won national fiddling titles, including the National Oldtime Fiddlers Contest, and in 2013 she was inducted into the North American Old Time Fiddlers Hall of Fame.

== Early life and education ==
Williams' early years were influenced by her father’s fiddle and harmonica playing and her mother’s love of gypsy violin. She began taking piano lessons at the age of six and classical violin lessons at the age of nine. While in college Williams played mandolin, guitar and banjo. This is where she met her future husband, Phil Williams. A visit from Pete Seeger ignited the couple’s interest in folk music.

She graduated from Reed College in Portland, Oregon, with a B.A in American history in 1959. Williams attended graduate school and received an M.A. in anthropology from the University of Washington. She started to work on a PhD but "lost interest in the whole academic thing".

== The early 1960s in Seattle ==
At the age of 22, she began playing the fiddle in "self-defense against the banjo". One of the first fiddle tunes Williams played is “Old Molly Hare”, which she got from a Mike Seeger album. When Bill Monroe played Washington State in the early 1960s, he hired Williams to play fiddle for two shows. Monroe said, “I have never heard a lady fiddler that could beat Williams, and a lot of men fiddlers can’t beat her".

Williams disclosed that she relied on her friend and local musician Paul Wiley (originally from Kentucky) to help her learn several Monroe tunes before he arrived in Seattle. Murphy Hicks Henry writes that Vivian Williams has a "well-deserved reputation as one of the top fiddlers in the Northwest".

In 1962, Vivian and Phil Williams formed a string band named 'The Turkey Pluckers' to play at square dances, coffee houses, and on television. KAYO, a local country radio station, were broadcasting a milking contest from the top of the newly built Seattle Space Needle and hired the Williams' band to play background music. When a local square dance caller, Kappie Kappenman, heard this on the radio he rushed to the Space Needle with his group of eight young square dancers all decked out in western wear. They got off the elevator at the top of the Space Needle and immediately began calling and dancing to the tune the Williams' were playing. This event led to quite a bit of publicity for square dancing, which had been dwindling.

== The Mid-1960s and Darrington, Washington ==
In the mid-1960s, Williams was a founding member of the bluegrass band 'Tall Timber Boys'. She thought it was okay to use the word "Boys" because Bill Monroe had used it in his band and he had a female bass player once. Later on, they changed the name to the 'Tall Timber Gang'. Williams also formed the all-female trio, White Pine Girls, just for fun in the mid-1960s with Barbara Hug on banjo and Carol Crist on guitar.

Williams began playing bluegrass music, but then drew from Scandinavian, Celtic, and old time musical influences including a unique Northwest style of fiddling. Williams was significantly influenced by musicians in the Darrington logging and milling community northeast of Seattle. Several musicians with Kentucky, North Carolina, West Virginia and Tennessee roots along with a few northern European immigrants gathered to play music frequently. Williams described Darrington, Washington as "an end-of-the-road kind of place back then", and they "played with a heartfeltness the two of them hadn’t found anywhere else".

She fondly recalled a singer and guitarist, Gladys Lewis, who performed during informal stage shows. The typical jam session would place the women in the kitchen cooking/gossiping while the men played music in the living room. According to Williams, "The women musicians rarely played or sang in public I was apparently accepted because a) I was married and therefore not a threat, b) they needed a fiddle player, and c) I was a weird hippy city girl so normal expectations didn't apply".

There were outdoor picnics with the Tar Heel (North Carolina) folks where people would have a family table but share food with other tables. There would be a loosely arranged stage show, jam sessions and socializing. There was no dancing except when someone had too much to drink and they did a "hillbilly jig" on a picnic table. Williams says drinking was typically minimal because these were family oriented events. ệMissouri folk's picnics were similar except they were held in a more remote location near Lynden, Washington with fewer outsiders attending.

== Voyager Recordings ==
Along with her husband Phil Williams, they created the Voyager Recording label in 1967. After extensive travel through Washington, Idaho and Montana, recording numerous old time fiddlers, she and Phil wanted to put their research into recordings. They could not find an established record producer to complete their project, so they started their own label. Williams describes Voyager "as a hobby that got out of hand". On the Voyager label they released recordings of traditional and historical fiddle and mandolin music. Some of the Williams recordings of Byron Berline and Texas Shorty from Missoula, Montana, and Weiser, Idaho, sessions were eventually put together into a compilation for the first Voyager record entitled Fiddle Jam Sessions. A Bluegrass Unlimited review after this release called it "top-caliber". Along with her husband Phil, Williams co-produced over fifty albums on the Voyager label. They also published instructional textbooks and workshop manuals such as “Brand New Old Time Fiddle Tunes". The Williams' released Comin’ Round the Mountain in 1969 on their Voyager label with songs from the Darrington folks with whom they were friends.

== The 1970s in Seattle ==
Williams served on the board of directors of the Northwest Folklife Festival for several years. This free admission folk music festival has grown into one of the largest in the United States. She is known for performing at contra dances up and down the I-5 corridor in Washington beginning in the late 1970s. She was influenced by a piano player, Pat Spaeth, and she joined in 'he Salmonberry Band' to play contra music. This band had lost their fiddler, but Williams was concerned that they played too often for her schedule. So the band added another fiddle player to alternate with Williams. Both fiddlers had fun playing together, so they started playing two fiddle harmony. Williams and her husband played together in the contra music band 'Small Pleasures'.

In 1975, Williams teamed up with Barbara Lamb to release Twin Sisters, one of the earliest instrumental bluegrass albums released by women. Williams played harmony fiddle to Lamb’s lead. A Bluegrass Unlimited reviewer called the fiddling on this album "smooth, clean, and together" and "except as singers, women have been featured too rarely in country music. A nice album like this one goes a little ways toward filling the gap".

Williams released her first solo album Fiddler on Voyager in 1979. She was backed by the Tall Timber band. Once more, a Bluegrass Unlimited reviewer recognized her style and classical training as "very polished and exact" and further suggested that anyone into "clean well-executed fiddle playing should enjoy the album". Williams is a noted composer of fiddle tunes, some of which have been recorded by prominent folk and bluegrass musicians. It wasn’t until the mid-1980s that she got together with Harley and Shara Bray and her husband Phil to form “Williams and Bray”.

The Puget Sound Guitar Workshop has cited Vivian Williams as “one of the leading oldtime and bluegrass fiddlers on the West coast." When the Del McCoury Band was touring the Northwest in the 1990s, He asked his fiddler player Jason Carter to spend time with Williams. Carter is a three-time IBMA Fiddle Player of the Year winner. Williams taught Carter her composition of “Chicken Under the Washtub” which was incorporated into the band setlist and later recorded by Jason on his 1997 solo album "On the Move".

Williams has a story about how she acquired her fiddle. In the early 1970s, Richard "Poncho" Ponshock found a decrepit old fiddle at a thrift store in Seattle. He bought it for seven and one-half dollars. Williams ended up buying it from him for one hundred dollars because she thought it had value. After getting an estimate for fixing it from David Saunders, one of the better-known luthiers in Seattle, she checked with a Swiss immigrant who worked on instruments by the name of Hermann Bischoffberger. Sanders told her "For $600 I can make it perfect", and Bischoffberger said "For $300 I can make it vunderfull [sic]". "So I figured that $300 for vunderfull beats $600 for perfect any day, and the rest is history! Hermann finished it in about nine months and it plays really well" This violin was manufactured by Christian Wilhelm Seidel in the late 19th century.

She likes to tutor younger fiddle players and hopes to carry on the traditional styles of fiddling that way. She says "oldtime is not one thing. It's regional. There’s Appalachian, Missouri style, Texas style, Canadian, Northern Missourian, Metis, and others".

== Awards and recognition ==
Williams has participated in and won numerous fiddle contests. She is a four-time winner of the West Coast International fiddle competition, three-time National Ladies Champion, seven-time Washington State fiddle champion, Washington State Senior champion, and 1999 National Senior Champion. She won the Smithsonian Fiddle Contest in Washington, D.C. Williams has been a winner at least eight times at the National Oldtime Fiddlers Contest and Festival in Weiser, Idaho, including three National Champion wins in 1966, 1967, and 1968.

Williams was inducted into the National Old Time Fiddlers Contest Hall of Fame, Weiser, Idaho, June 2013. She was inducted into the North American Old Time Fiddlers Hall of Fame, Osceola, New York, July 2013.

== Death ==
Vivian Williams died on January 6, 2023 at the age of 84. She had been suffering with Amyotrophic Lateral Sclerosis (ALS), aka Lou Gehrig’s disease.
