= Blaine Stubblefield =

American oldtime fiddler and folk music archivist

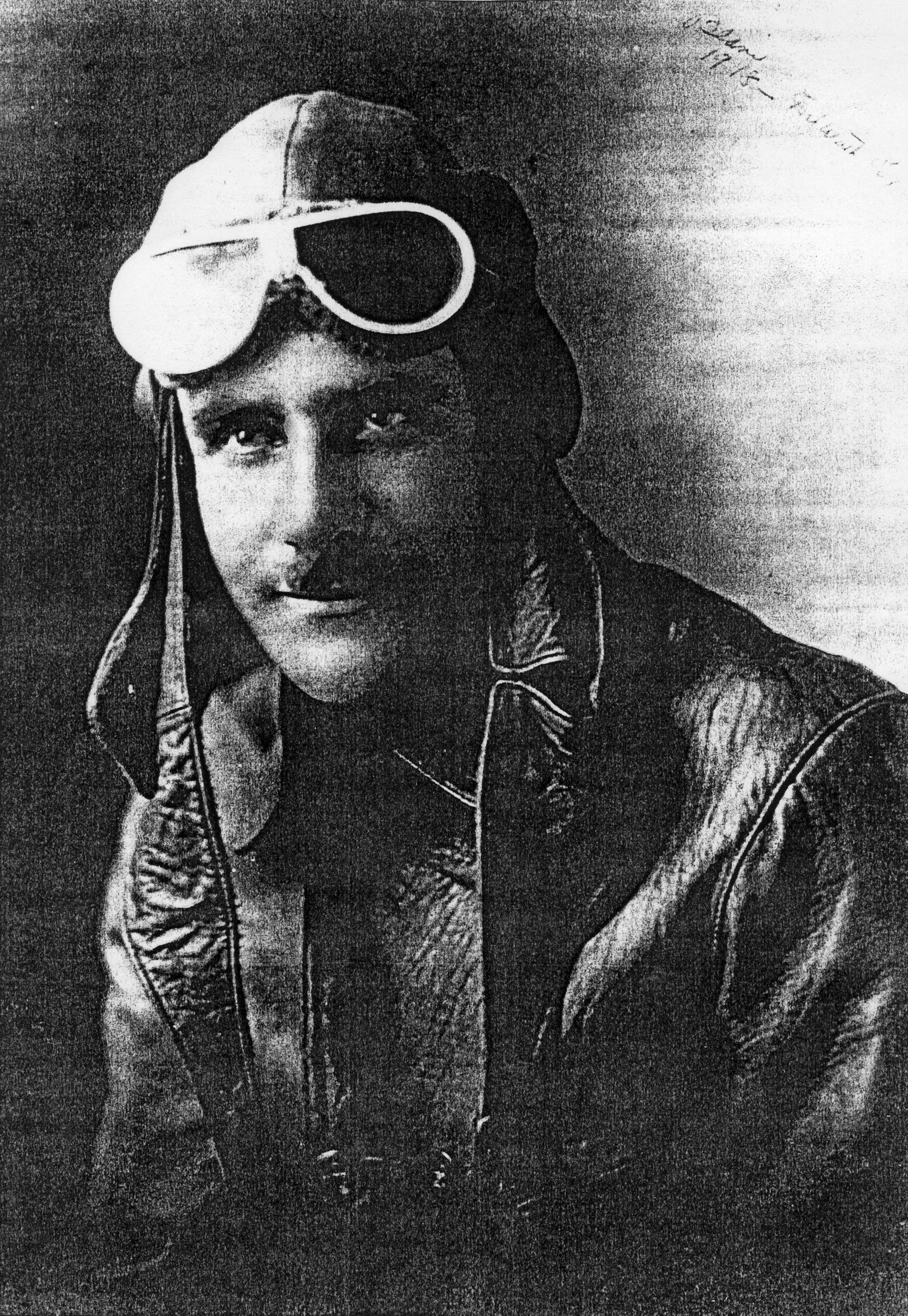
- Born: January 26, 1896; Enterprise, Oregon, US
- Died: December 18, 1960 (aged 64); Boise, Idaho, US
- Resting place: Weiser, Idaho, US
- Education: University of Idaho
- Occupations: Writer and editor
- Known for: Originated National Oldtime Fiddlers' Contest and Hells Canyon passenger boating

Blaine Stubblefield (January 26, 1896 – December 18, 1960) was the founder of the National Oldtime Fiddlers' Contest held annually in Weiser, Idaho, an archiver of American folk songs, the originator of regular passenger boat tours down the Hells Canyon of the Snake River, a writer, and a magazine editor.

Blaine was born in Enterprise, Oregon. and was the eldest of ten children born to Mickle and Edith Stubblefield.

Blaine's father Mickle was the eldest of seven children born to William Kirkham Stubblefield and his fifth wife Josephine Loomis Stubblefield. Mickle's wife, the former Edith Belle Davis, had come to Wallowa County, Oregon with her family from Iowa.

Mickle Stubblefield was a historian who shared his family history with his children and expanded his use of the written word through an avid letter-writing campaign to explain the true burial site of Chief Joseph.

Blaine attended and graduated from the University of Idaho, and obtained an advanced degree in journalism from the University of Washington.

In the later part of his life, Blaine lived in Weiser; documents on folk music often refer to him as "Blaine Stubblefield of Weiser, Idaho".

== Army aviator during World War I ==
During World War I, Blaine joined the United States Army Air Service (forerunner of the United States Air Force) in 1917 and was a Flying Cadet at Kelly Field, San Antonio, Texas. Graduates of the Army flight school at Kelly Field include Charles Lindbergh and Curtis E. LeMay. Major General Claire Chennault of World War II "Flying Tiger" fame taught at the school.

Completing Flying School, Blaine was commissioned as a Lieutenant, was recommended for pursuit pilot (single hand combat), and was sent to Brooks Field (also in San Antonio) to take the flying instructors' course. He then served as a flying instructor at Brooks Field for the remainder of his military service.

Three letters written by Blaine during this period were printed by the Enterprise Record Chieftain newspaper (Enterprise, Oregon).

== Middle years ==
Blaine attended the University of Idaho in the 1924-1925 and 1925–1926 academic years, and he graduated. In 1924-1925 he was Junior Class President for First Semester. That same year, he was also a member of the news staff of The University Argonaut (the official newspaper of the University of Idaho), a member of The Press Club, a member of Phi Gamma Delta, an associate editor of The Blue Bucket (the official Literary Magazine of the university), and was an officer of Winged Helmet (honorary literary fraternity). Another officer of Winged Helmet and member of the news staff of The University Argonaut and a staff member of The Blue Bucket was Ruth Muriel Aspray of Spokane, Washington, whom Blaine married. In 1925–1926, Blaine was a Senior and he continued in many of the same activities as in his Junior year.

In 1925, Blaine was promoting completion of U.S. Highway 95 (Idaho's north–south highway) and promoting tourism along its route. In July 1925, he set up a headquarters for his campaign in Spokane, Washington. In October 1925, Blaine wrote about a trip through Idaho along the newly completed U.S. Highway 95 in Western Highways Builder magazine, full of historical references and colorful descriptions of the landscapes.

Blaine took an advanced degree in journalism at the University of Washington in 1927.

During 1927 and 1928, Blaine wrote a weekly aviation-related column in the San Francisco News Letter under the byline "Lieutenant Blaine Stubblefield". He resided in the San Francisco area during this period. In 1927, Blaine broadcast weekly airplane flying lessons over San Francisco radio station KFRC. Also in 1927, Blaine took on an additional job: Boeing Air Transport publicity manager. He later moved to the east coast and worked as an editor of McGraw-Hill aviation magazines in New York and Washington, DC.

In his life as a writer, Blaine wrote several short stories and unpublished novels and radio scripts.

Blaine Stubblefield attended President Franklin D. Roosevelt's Inaugural Ball as a press corps member.

On July 17, 1946, President Harry S. Truman met with Stubblefield and other editors and executives of the McGraw-Hill Publishing Company in Washington DC for a two-day meeting.

== Recording folk songs for the Library of Congress ==
Blaine's father Mickle played the fiddle. In his youth in the Snake River country, Blaine learned to play guitar and fiddle and took an interest in folksongs, which he picked up from miners, cattlemen, pioneers, sheepherders, and traveling medicine men. Blaine also got songs from his father. Mickle typed some songs out on his typewriter. Blaine became an enthusiastic folksong collector and singer. While editor of McGraw-Hill's Aviation magazine in Washington, DC, Blaine was asked by a local radio station to run a weekly program of folk music. In this way he attracted the interest of ethnomusicologist Alan Lomax at the Library of Congress.

Blaine worked with Alan Lomax to record folk songs at the Archive of Folk Culture of the Library of Congress in Washington DC. The songs were recorded on 12-inch phonograph records or reel-to-reel magnetic tape and are available in the Idaho Collections in the Archive of Folk Culture at the Library of Congress. Fourteen songs sung by Blaine were recorded in 1938. In 1939 and 1942, five songs sung by Blaine were recorded and five songs sung by Blaine and Frank A. Melton were recorded. Blaine accompanied himself on guitar.

The words and music of four songs sung by Blaine in 1938, Way Out in Idaho, If He'd Be a Buckaroo, The Low-Down, Lonesome Low, and Brennan on the Moor, (see also Willy Brennan) were printed in Our Singing Country and are available online. Other folksongs sung by Blaine in the Library of Congress recordings include Bryan O'Lynn, Poor Miner, The Farmer's Curst Wife, and The Golden Vanity.

Some folk songs recorded by Stubblefield for the Library of Congress and designated as "by Blaine Stubblefield" were not authored by him.

Several of the folk songs contributed by Stubblefield to the Library of Congress had been gotten by Blaine from his father Mickle.

=== Way Out in Idaho ===
The well-known song Way Out in Idaho (songwriter unknown, early 1880s) -- arguably Idaho's greatest folk song—is notable in many regards. In 1938, Alan Lomax at the U. S. Library of Congress recorded eight verses sung by Blaine Stubblefield accompanied by his guitar (AFS 1634 B1). This is the earliest known English-language recording of Idaho songs (some Nez Perce recordings predate the Stubblefield recording). Way Out in Idaho lightheartedly tells of the trials and tribulations of laborers building the Oregon Short Line Railroad from Pocatello, Idaho to Ontario, Oregon in 1882. Stubblefield's track originally was released in the series "Folk Music of the United States", Library of Congress Recording Laboratory, AFS L6, 1968. The track also is found on the 1997 Rounder CD 1508, Railroad Songs and Ballads, The Library of Congress Archive of Folk Culture.

A 30-second snippet of this recording of Way Out in Idaho (the complete song is 3 minutes 13 seconds in length) is available for free listening on a number of webpages, including this one

== National Oldtime Fiddlers' Contest ==
Newspaper files report fiddling contests that were held in Weiser, Idaho from 1914 to World War I. The mid-20th Century resurrection of fiddling contests in Weiser was due to efforts led by Blaine Stubblefield who was Secretary of Weiser's Chamber of Commerce from 1948 until his death in December 1960.

Both Blaine and his father Mickle were fiddlers. Blaine's interest in country fiddling music led him to ask the Weiser Chamber of Commerce Directors to allocate $175 for a fiddle contest. Nothing happened until January 1953, when the idea was proposed to hold the contest during intermissions of the Fifth Annual Weiser Square Dance Festival. Prize money was underwritten by two individuals and the first official fiddling event came to life on April 18, 1953. It was billed as the Northwest Mountain Fiddlers' Contest and was a huge success. The name was changed to the Northwest Oldtime Fiddling Championships in 1956 when a regional division was added for out-of-area fiddlers. Today, the contest is known as the National Oldtime Fiddlers' Contest & Festival and is held in June of each year, attracting musicians from throughout the nation, especially the West and Midwest. The event lasts a full seven days (it's also called "Fiddle Week") and is packed with activities, especially each night. On Saturday, there is a parade.

During "Fiddle Week" during the 1950s, Elnora Ford and Blaine Stubblefield would set up their pianos on separate corners in downtown Weiser and lead shoppers in song as the shoppers went from store to store. Elnora wrote many songs, including "It's Wiser to Live in Weiser" and "I'm a Farm Wife and I've Got Ants in My Pants".

== Passenger boat trips in Hells Canyon ==
As a boy, Stubblefield used to ride mail boats on the Snake River. From 1949 to 1953, Stubblefield ran short boat trips for tourists on the Snake River in Hells Canyon from Homestead, Oregon downstream to the Kinney Creek rapids and back again. It was a 32-mile round trip.

In 1953, Stubblefield instituted an operation running passenger boats downstream through Hells Canyon. He used a 31-foot, twin-propeller boat called Chief Joseph at first, then upgraded to several 33-foot converted Army bridge pontoon boats with 25-horsepower outboard engines. The boat trips began at Homestead and ended at Lewiston, Idaho—a trip of 150 miles. This was the first operation to regularly provide passenger tours through Hells Canyon, and operated six months each year. The trip took from three days to a week. Passengers brought along camping equipment and set up camp on shore each night. Upon reaching Lewiston, the boats were trucked back to their starting point. It was impossible to go all the way back upstream on the river. The asking price was a $500 minimum (equivalent to $4000 in 2010 dollars) for one or two passengers with $200 for each additional passenger. This was for a full week's cruise—side trips were possible—and included food, refreshments, and a trip back to Weiser by car or airplane. Stubblefield's operation provided some cargo service for prospectors, ranchers and miners at remote spots along the way, but the tourist trade was the major part of Stubblefield's business.

== Family ==
Blaine Stubblefield was married three times: (1) to Ruth Muriel Aspray (born April 4, 1906, died October 21, 1994); (2) to Verna Alice Henning Stubblefield (born June 16, 1908, died December 13, 1956) who died, and then (3) to Helen Buie. Stubblefield has a stepson, Bill Buie, a son of Helen from her earlier marriage. Bill, his wife Leona Jean Buie, and their three children and grandchildren live in Idaho and New Mexico. Leona Jean Buie is a daughter of Blaine's brother Seth William ("Bill") Stubblefield.

Blaine Stubblefield died in the Veterans Administration Hospital in Boise, Idaho on December 18, 1960, of cancer. He is buried in Weiser, Idaho. After his death, his widow Helen remarried, becoming Helen Stubblefield Elliott. In 2010, Helen donated Blaine's papers to the Idaho State Historical Society.

A "Memorial to Blaine Stubblefield" is recorded on a reel-to-reel magnetic tape in Folk Collection 35b of the Barre Toelken Sound Recording Collection at Utah State University. The same tape contains recordings of several folk songs sung by Blaine, a Chamber of Commerce Commercial, a poem about Blaine Stubblefield; and Blaine tells a story. The tape was given to Barre Toelken by Helen Stubblefield Elliott and/or the Weiser Chamber of Commerce.

== Unpublished manuscript ==
- Stubblefield, Blaine, ed. (1924-05-22). History of the University of Idaho, 1889-1924 (Essays by students in Idaho history under Professor Cornelius James Brosnan and edited by Stubblefield). OCLC 42065687. Available at UI (University of Idaho) Library UI Library Special Collections (non-circulating) (Spec Col MG 5143)
