= Hells Canyon Dam =

Dam in Wallowa County, Oregon, United States

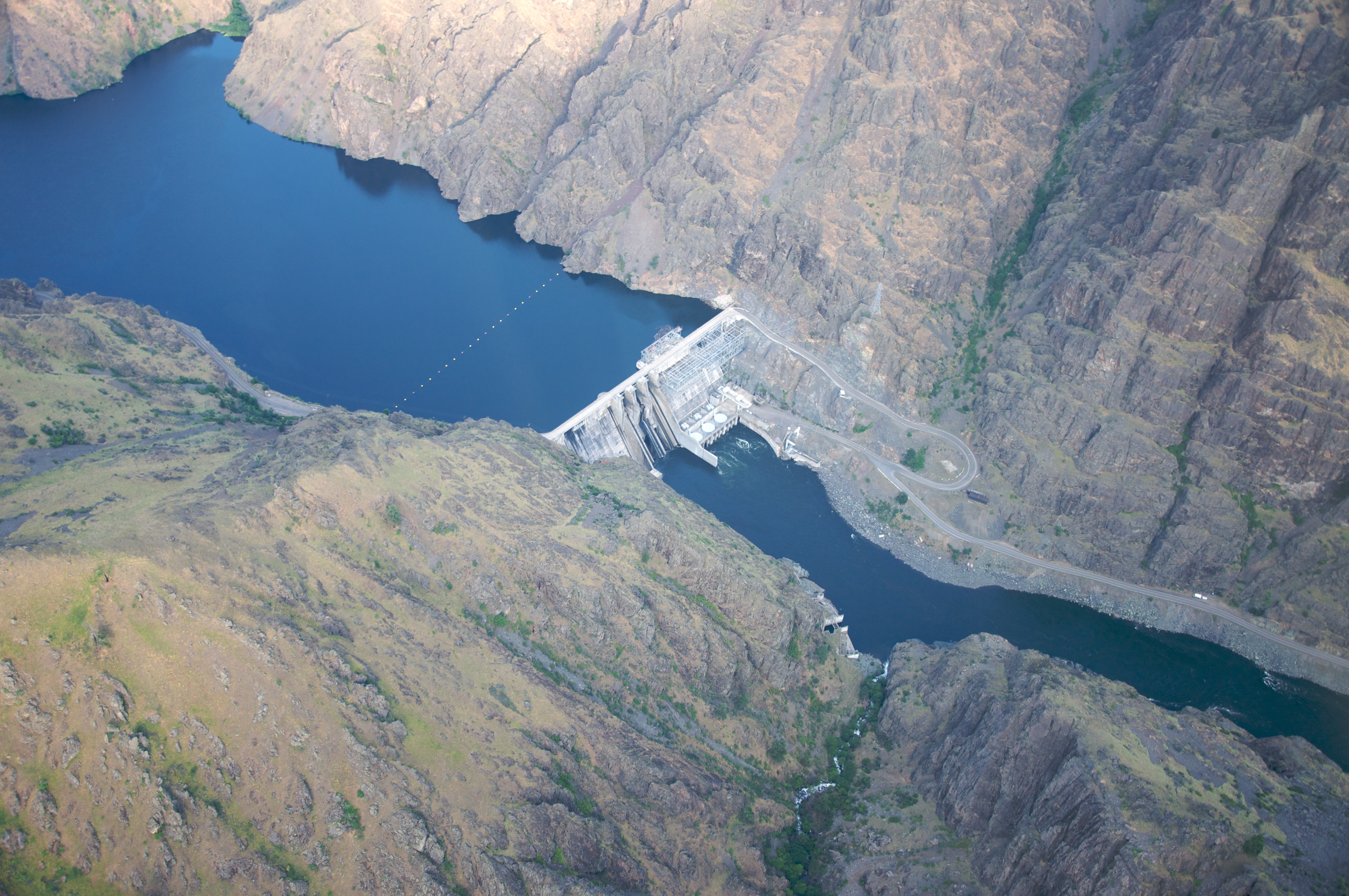
- Aerial view from northeast

- Location in the United States Location in Idaho
- Country: United States
- Location: Hells Canyon, Adams County, Idaho / Wallowa County, Oregon
- Coordinates: 45°14′41″N 116°41′54″W
- Opening date: 1967; 59 years ago
- Operator: Idaho Power Company

Dam and spillways
- Impounds: Snake River
- Height: 330 ft (100 m)

Reservoir
- Creates: Hells Canyon Reservoir
- Total capacity: 188,000 acre⋅ft (232,000,000 m^{3})
- Catchment area: 73,300 sq mi (189,800 km^{2})
- Surface area: 3.9 sq mi (10 km^{2})
- Normal elevation: 1,650 ft (503 m)

Power Station
- Installed capacity: 391 MW
- Annual generation: 2,051.3 GWh
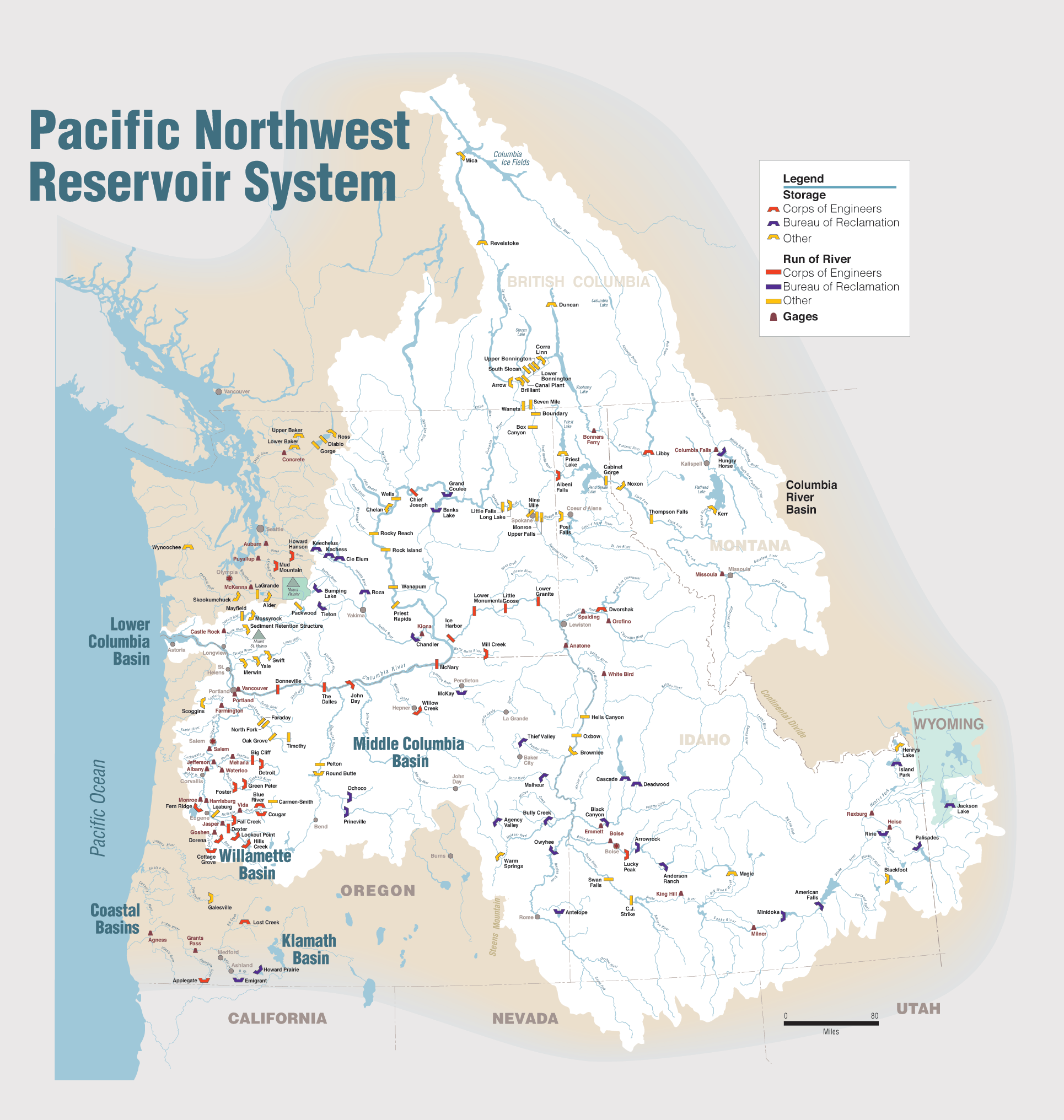
- Columbia River Basin dams

Hells Canyon Dam is a concrete gravity dam in the western United States, on the Snake River in Hells Canyon along the Idaho-Oregon border. At river mile 247, the dam impounds Hells Canyon Reservoir; its spillway elevation is 1,680 feet (512 m) above sea level.

It is the third and final hydroelectric dam of the Hells Canyon Project, which includes Brownlee Dam (1959) and Oxbow Dam (1961), all built and operated by Idaho Power Company. The Hells Canyon Complex on the Snake River is the largest privately owned hydroelectric power complex in the nation, according to the US Energy Information Administration. The contractor for the Hells Canyon Dam was Morrison-Knudsen of Boise.

The Hells Canyon Dam powerhouse contains three generating units, with a total nameplate capacity of 391 megawatts (MW). Power generation began with two units in 1967, the third came on line the following year.

Lacking passage for migrating salmon, the three dams of the Hells Canyon Project blocked access by anadromous salmonids to a stretch of the Snake River drainage basin from Hells Canyon Dam up to Shoshone Falls, which naturally prevents any upstream fish passage to the upper Snake River basin.

== High dam proposal ==
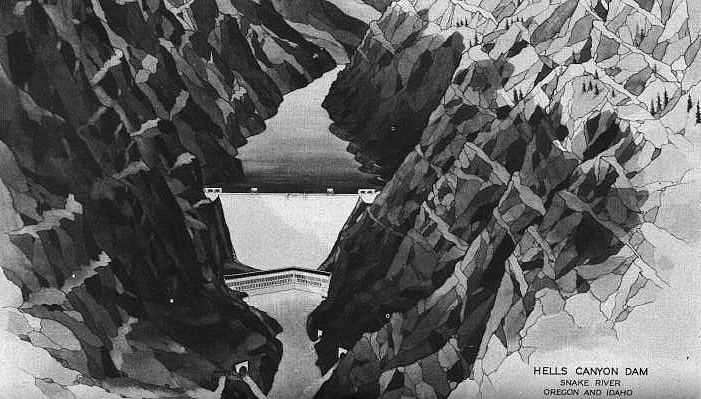
Proposed Hells Canyon High Dam

As built, Hells Canyon Dam is significantly lower than it was originally proposed in the 1940s, with three dams (Hells Canyon, Brownlee Dam and Oxbow Dam) taking the place of a single 710-foot (220 m) high dam. As proposed by the U.S. Army Corps of Engineers, the Hells Canyon High Dam would have been a straight-profile concrete gravity dam with two gate-controlled tunnel spillways, one in each abutment.

The proposed reservoir was planned to have a capacity of 4,050,000 acre-feet (5.00 km^{3}) with an area of 23,500 acres (36.7 mi^{2}; 95 km^{2}). The reservoir was to extend 89 miles (143 km) upstream. The power plant was to be capable of generating 850 MW using ten units. The project included provisions for fish hatcheries, with the intention of maintaining salmon runs. Project cost was estimated at $342,076,000.

The proposals for a publicly built high dam became a big political issue in many Western states. Both of Oregon's senators Wayne Morse and Richard L. Neuberger proposed a public dam, but were blocked. Many Western moderately pro-civil rights senators supported Southern Democrats in their efforts to water down the 1957 Civil Rights Act in return for southern support for a publicly built high dam. However the Idaho Senator Frank Church who was a strong supporter of the high dam (whose maiden speech was on the subject) and a prominent Western liberal Senator who voted in favor of the 1957 Act, said that "There was never any quid pro quo at all".

The high dam project was in the end not pursued.

== See also ==
- List of power stations in the United States
- List of dams in the Columbia River watershed
