= Fern Hobbs =

American attorney (1883–1964)

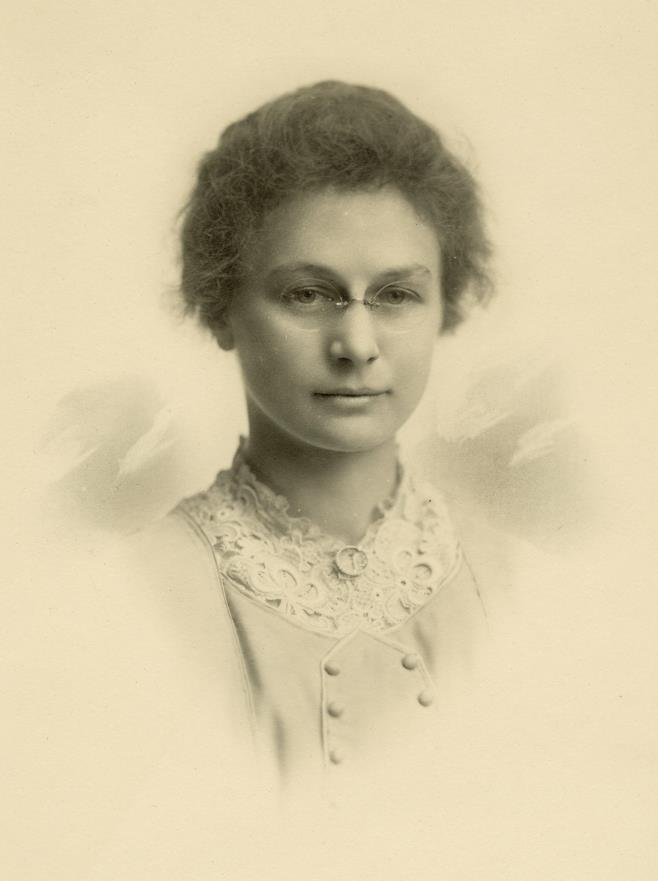
- Hobbs in 1913
- Born: May 8, 1883; Bloomington, Nebraska, US
- Died: April 10, 1964 (aged 80); Portland, Oregon, US
- Resting place: Hillsboro Pioneer Cemetery; 45.52029°N 123.00524°W
- Occupations: secretary, attorney, commissioner

Fern Hobbs (May 8, 1883 – April 10, 1964) was an American attorney in the U.S. state of Oregon, and private secretary to Oregon Governor Oswald West. She was noted for her ambition and several accomplishments as a young woman, and became the highest-paid woman in public service in America in her mid-twenties.

Hobbs made international news when Governor West sent her to implement martial law in the small Eastern Oregon town of Copperfield. The event was considered a strategic coup for West, establishing the State's authority over a remote rural community and cementing his reputation as a proponent of prohibition.

Hobbs later worked for the American Red Cross in Europe and at The Oregon Journal newspaper. She died in Portland in 1964.

== Early life and career in public service ==
Hobbs was born on May 8, 1883, in Bloomington, Nebraska, to John Alden Hobbs and Cora Bush Hobbs. Her family moved to Salt Lake City, Utah when she was six years old; she lived there for 12 years, finishing high school. Her father then met with financial difficulties, and she moved to Oregon, settling in Hillsboro. There, she put her younger brother and sister through school, while studying stenography and working for a living, initially as a governess in a Portland home.

She soon became a private secretary to the president of the Title Guarantee and Trust Company. The bank, which held many assets of the Oregon Common School Fund, failed during Hobbs' time there. Ben Olcott, was appointed by Governor Chamberlain to represent the state in investigating the bank over the state's assets. He took note of Hobbs' strong loyalty to her employer.

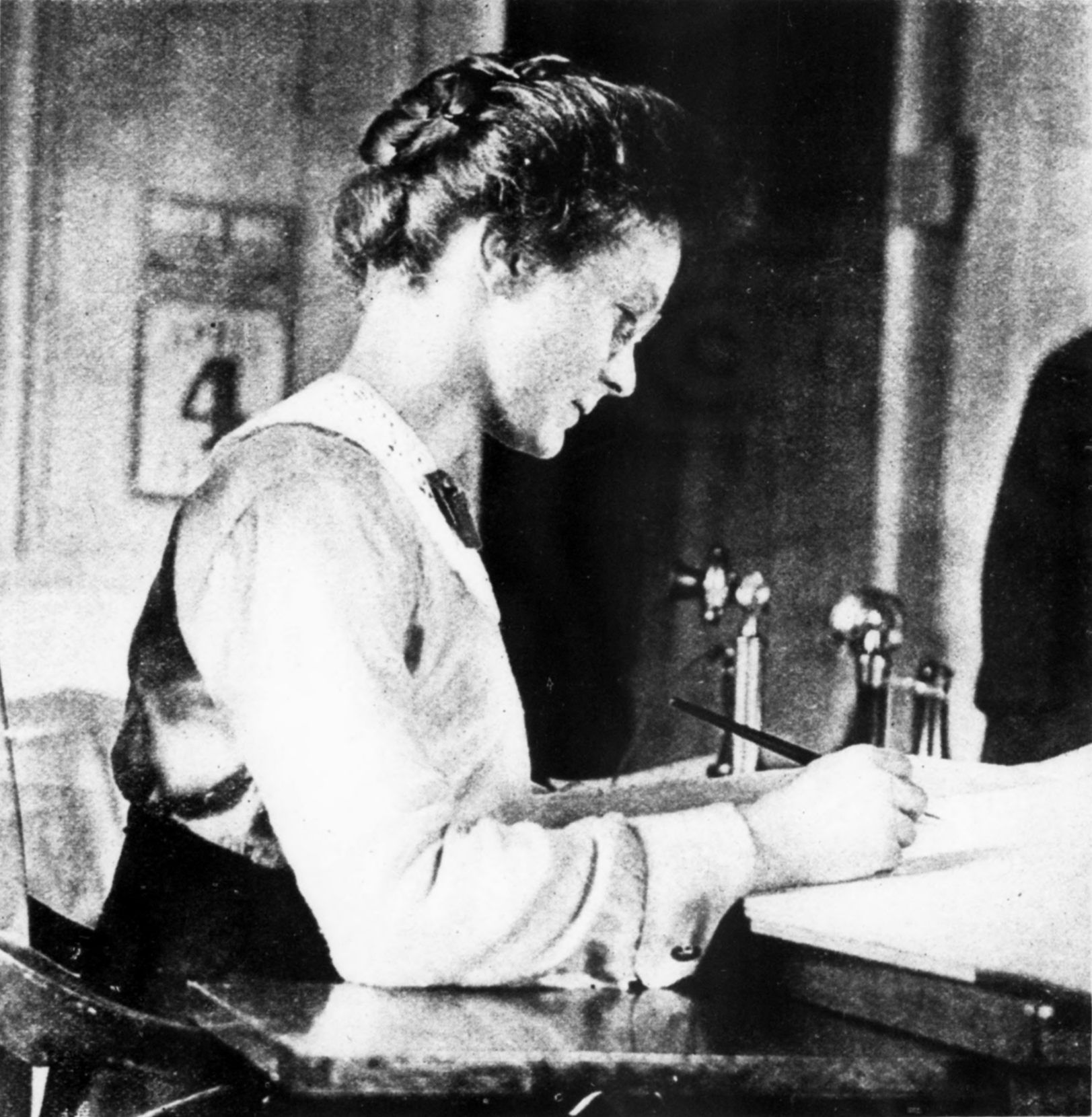
Fern Hobbs, prior to her trip to Copperfield, Oregon

After the bank's failure, Hobbs worked as a governess for J. Wesley Ladd (brother of William S. Ladd) in Portland. She also continued to help raise her younger brother and sister, studied stenography and the law, and worked as a secretary. In 1913, Hobbs graduated from Willamette University College of Law with a Bachelor of Laws degree, and was admitted to the Oregon State Bar.

Olcott, who managed Oswald West's successful 1910 campaign to become Governor of Oregon, recommended that West hire Hobbs as his private stenographer. She was hired, and impressed West to the point that he hired her as his private secretary two years later, making her the first Oregon woman appointed to an important political office following the passage of the Oregon Equal Suffrage Amendment. This also made her, at age 27, the highest-paid woman in public service in the United States, earning $3,000 per year. While West was a prominent supporter of woman suffrage, Hobbs was quoted opposing the policy early in her career. West soon dispatched her to Washington, D.C. to represent the state in various land matters; she was the first woman to represent a governor's interests in Washington, and local coverage in the nation's capital expressed some surprise that a woman would be given an assignment of such gravity. She negotiated successfully with congressional committees and the U.S. Department of the Interior to untangle ownership issues around various parcels of land.

== Martial law in Copperfield, Oregon ==
West ordered Hobbs to Copperfield, Oregon to restore law and order on January 2, 1914, along with a group of six militia that included Oregon State Penitentiary warden B.K. Lawson. Copperfield, located on the Snake River in Baker County, had grown up around construction projects for a railroad tunnel and power plant. Fifteen hundred jobs in the area came from the railway project of E. H. Harriman or the power generation facility.

The town had descended into lawlessness with a number of saloons, brothels, dancing halls, and widespread gambling. The town had no law enforcement officers, and the local government officials had become bar keepers. Governor West had extended prohibition laws, but they were widely ignored in Copperfield. Some local residents had appealed to the state government for assistance. Over half the residents of the town had signed a petition, addressed to West, alleging that saloons owned by the mayor and City Council members were selling liquor to minors and staying open later than their posted hours. Governor West responded by ordering county officials to restore order, close the saloons, and force the resignations of the corrupt city leaders by December 25, 1913.

"Armed? Well, yes; I am. I have a dressing bag, a portfolio and an umbrella. I don't believe I could do much damage with these. Do I look like a Carrie Nation to you?"

— Fern Hobbs, en route to Copperfield, addressing whether she was armed

County officials did not take care of the problem, so West sent Hobbs, hoping the presence of a woman would prevent any outbreak of violence. She was dispatched with orders to restore order and to implement martial law if necessary. While Hobbs was traveling to Eastern Oregon, both she and Governor West were coy with reporters about the presence of the militia, suggesting that Hobbs might be acting alone.

The saloon keepers, who received word that Hobbs was accompanied by law enforcement officers only shortly before her arrival, greeted her by dressing up the town with bunting, blue and pink ribbons, and flowers. A town meeting was arranged at 2:30 p.m. on January 3. Hobbs presented resignation letters prepared on behalf of city officials, but the officials refused to sign. Hobbs then ordered Lawson to declare martial law. It was the first time in Oregon since the Civil War that martial law was put into effect.

Soon the town was disarmed and order restored, with the gambling equipment and weapons confiscated, and the saloons closed down. Hobbs then left Lawson in charge and caught the 4:00 p.m. train out of town that same day. The residents did not openly resist Hobbs or the militia, although nearly all were armed and had been prepared to offer non-violent resistance. She stopped at the county seat in Baker City to officially remove the town's officials in front of a judge before returning to the state capitol in Salem. The Baker County Circuit Court quickly enjoined the militia from holding the town under martial law; Sheriff Rand began assembling a posse to carry out the court order. Governor West requested a hearing, seeking Rand's temporary removal from office, and appointed Hobbs to represent the State as special counsel.

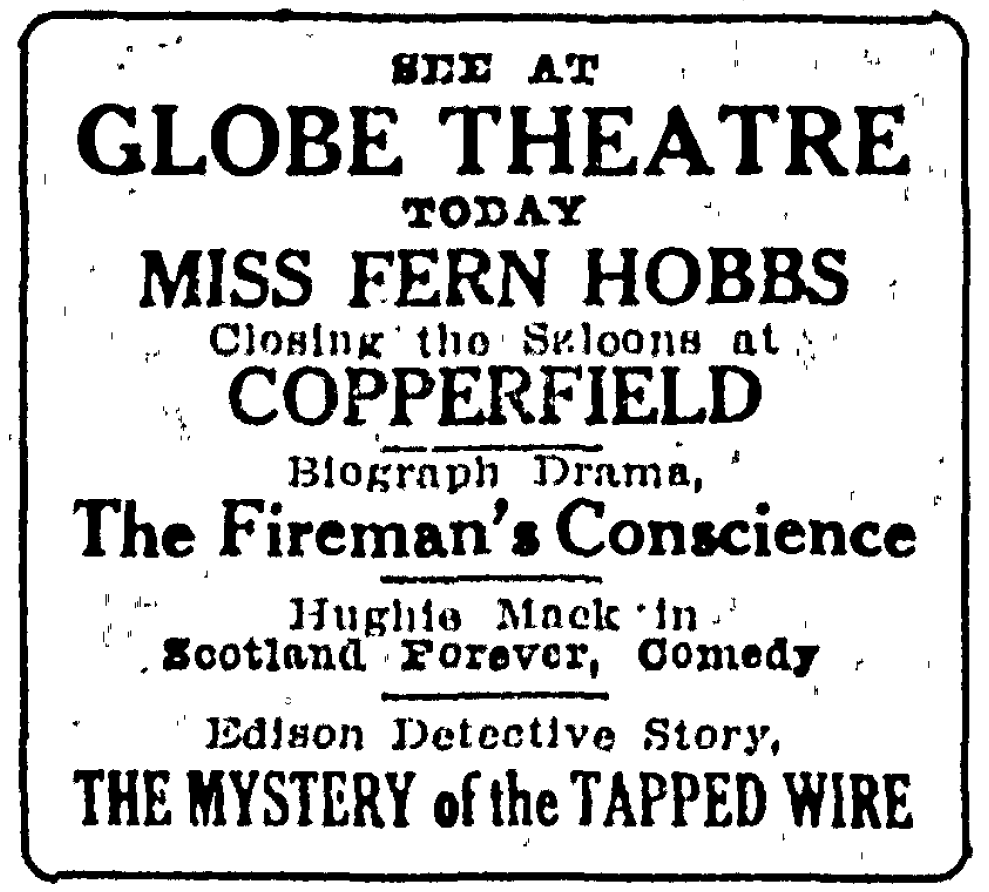
Newspaper ad for a theatrical reenactment of the Copperfield affair from the Oregon Journal, January 28, 2014.

The actions of the governor were later challenged in court, with Hobbs and West among the defendants. The saloon keepers sought remuneration for liquor they claimed was confiscated during the period of martial law. The Baker County circuit court determined the governor's actions were within his powers, and the Oregon Supreme Court ultimately concurred.

These events made Hobbs the most famous woman in Oregon at that time. Hobbs also made national and international news for these events. Writer Stewart Holbrook reported:

In England, the Copperfield story escaped all bounds. One read that Miss Hobbs took off for the hellish place in command of a full battery of field artillery, plus machine gunners, in a special train; that she snapped commands to her troops and had them unlimber and train the heavy pieces on the doomed city.

== Later life ==
After the Copperfield affair, Hobbs continued as Governor West's secretary. She visited the Union County town of Cove in February 1914, also to investigate complaints about a saloon. A local election had declared the town "dry," but a county election had declared the entire county "wet." On advice of a judge, the mayor of Cove stated that he was unable to determine whether the saloon was legal or not, but expressed deference to the governor's wishes. Hobbs did not order the saloon closed down.

Despite speculation around the country that Hobbs would run for governor of Oregon, she did not seek the office.

In early 1915, West appointed Hobbs to the Oregon Industrial Accident Commission in January 1915, just prior to the end of his one term as governor. Hobbs' departure from that post later in the year was not without controversy; she offered her resignation to the Oregon State Senate as a bargaining maneuver, in exchange for its support of a contentious workmen's compensation bill. Senators speculated that her letter was presented in coordination with the ex-governor, in an effort to embarrass the Senate. Subsequently, the legislature passed a law permitting appointive heads (such as the governor) to recall officials from appointed positions. Then-governor James Withycombe accepted Hobbs' resignation. At the time, she expressed regret for not completing her term, and announced her intention to return to Portland.

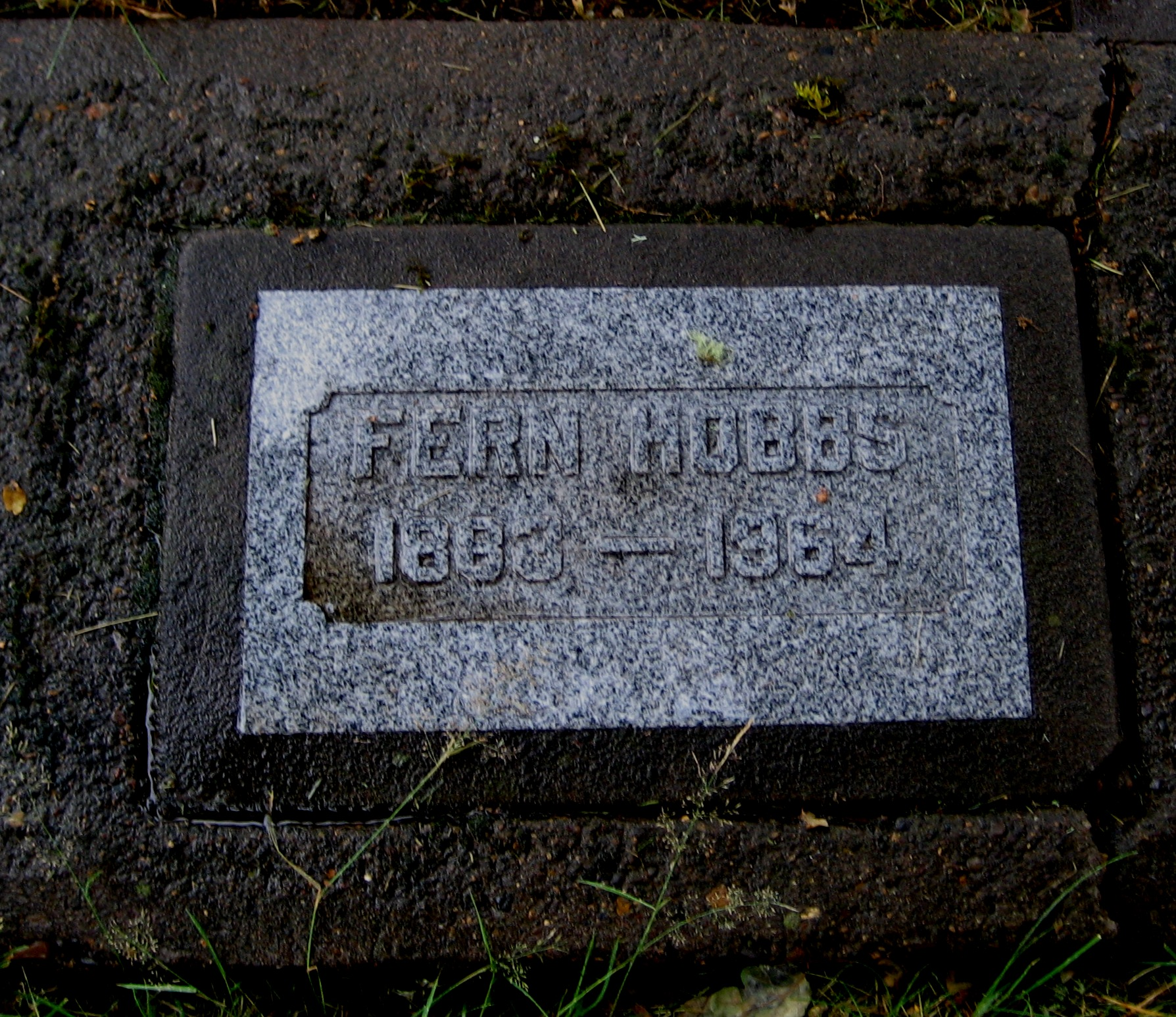
Gravemarker at Hillsboro Pioneer Cemetery

Upon returning to Portland, Hobbs practiced law. Women's rights groups promoted Hobbs as a candidate to run for governor, but she never ran for office. Within a few years Hobbs became the commissioner of Oregon State Industrial Accident Commission, working on getting taxes due on the Oregon & California Lands. In 1917, with the United States entering World War I, she began a long association with the Red Cross. From 1917 to 1922 she worked in Europe, including time spent as the chief of the casualty division in Paris, France. In that position Hobbs was responsible for notifying dead soldiers' next of kin. She returned to Europe in the 1930s, working in the Rhine Valley when it was occupied by France.

Upon returning to Oregon, Hobbs worked as a secretary for business manager of the Oregon Journal newspaper, retiring in 1948.

The Oregon writer Stewart Holbrook interviewed her in the early 1950s, a few years after her retirement, observing that she "still weighs 104 pounds. Her eyes are clear and blue behind her glasses. There is not a gray hair on her head. She lives as quietly as she has always lived, except for those dreadful few days so long ago [concerning Copperfield]." Holbrook noted during his interview that "the subject of Copperfield bores her" and concluded his account of her as follows:

She had much rather talk of her two years with the Red Cross in World War I, in France, and with the American Army of Occupation in Germany. That, she says, and her eyes light up, was a real adventure. One gathers that she considers the affair at Copperfield to have been a deplorable incident."

Fern Hobbs died on April 10, 1964, at the age of 80.
