= Oxbow Dam =

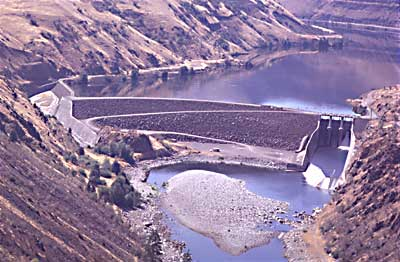

- Location in the United States Location in Idaho
- Official name: Oxbow Dam
- Country: United States
- Location: Hells Canyon, Adams County, Idaho / Baker County, Oregon
- Coordinates: 44°58′15″N 116°50′04″W
- Opening date: 1961; 65 years ago
- Operator: Idaho Power Company

Dam and spillways
- Impounds: Snake River
- Height: 175 feet (53 m)

Reservoir
- Creates: Oxbow Reservoir
- Total capacity: 58,200 acre-feet (71,800,000 m^{3})
- Catchment area: 73,300 square miles (190,000 km^{2})
- Surface area: 1,150 acres (470 ha)

Power Station
- Installed capacity: 190 megawatts (250,000 hp)
- Annual generation: 1,047 gigawatt-hours (3,770 TJ)
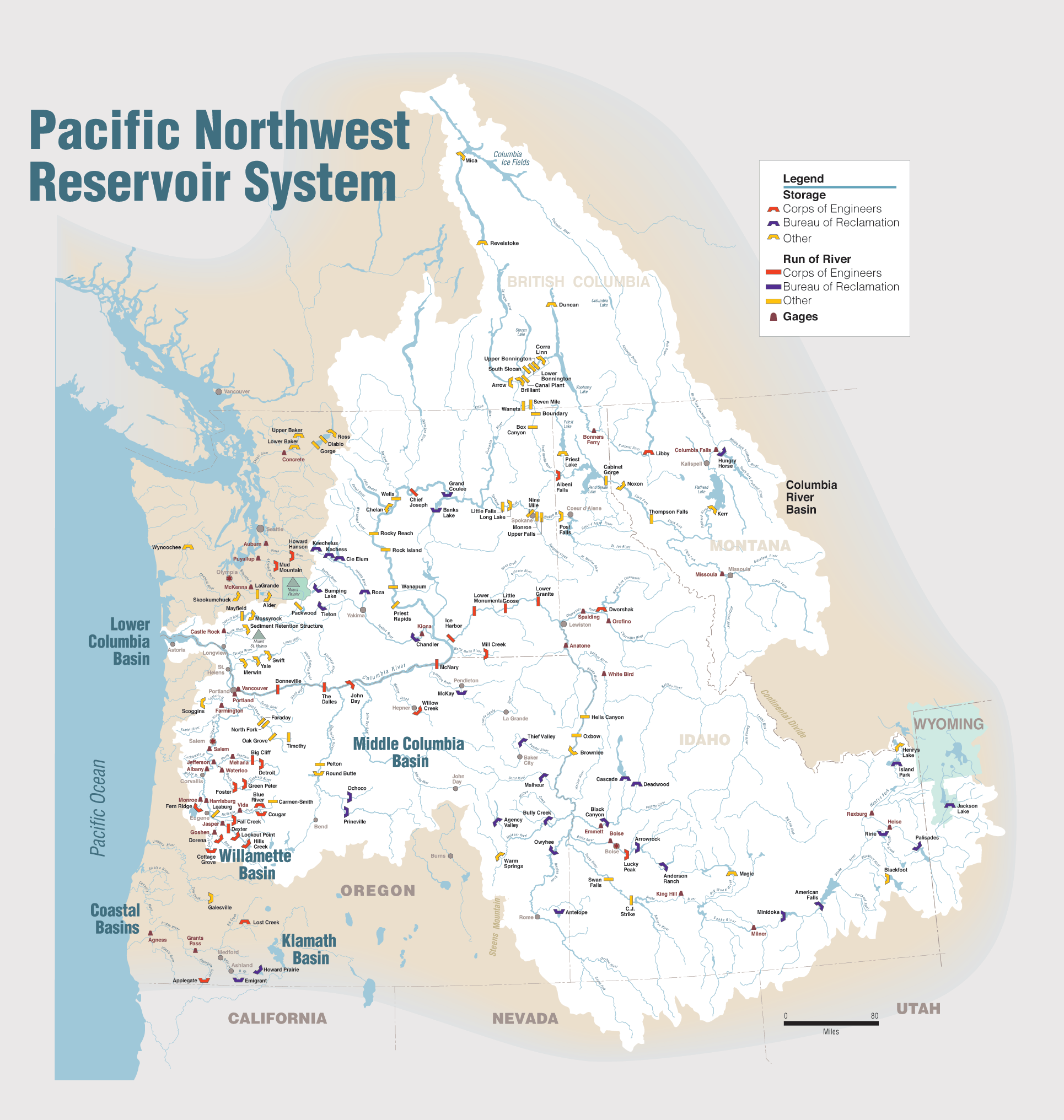
- Columbia River Basin dams

Oxbow Dam is a hydroelectric run-of-the-river rockfill dam in the western United States, on the Snake River in Hells Canyon (river mile 273) along the Idaho-Oregon border.

== Description ==
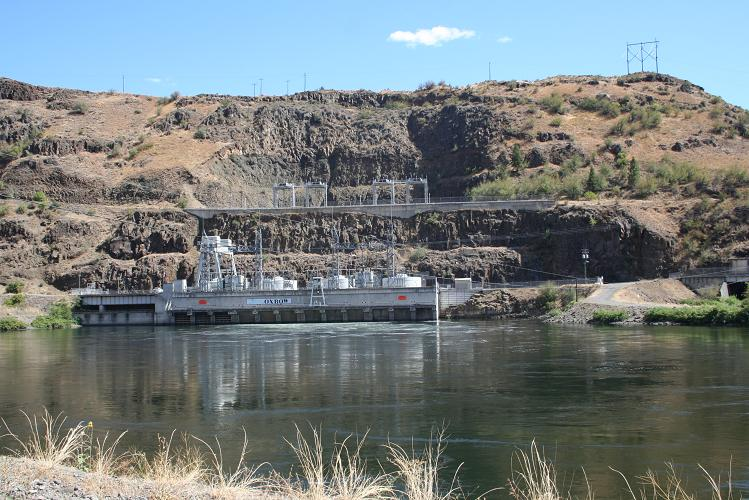
Oxbow Dam power station

Completed 65 years ago in 1961, the dam is part of the Hells Canyon Project that also includes Hells Canyon Dam and Brownlee Dam, all built and operated by Idaho Power Company.

The dam's powerhouse contains four generating units with a total nameplate capacity of 190 megawatts (250,000 hp).

Lacking passage for migrating salmon, the three Hells Canyon Project dams blocked access by anadromous salmonids to a stretch of the Snake River drainage basin from Hells Canyon Dam up to Shoshone Falls, which naturally prevents any upstream fish passage to the upper Snake River basin.

== Heliport ==
Oxbow Heliport (FAA LID: OR83) is a private 100-by-100-foot (30 by 30 m), turf heliport owned by Idaho Power.

== See also ==
- Copperfield, Oregon
- Oxbow, Oregon
- List of dams in the Columbia River watershed
