= Goodale's Cutoff =

- U.S. National Register of Historic Places
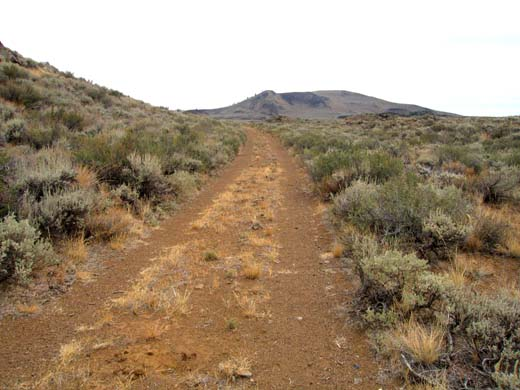

- Location within Idaho Location within the United States
- Nearest city: Arco, Idaho
- Coordinates: 43°28′48″N 113°33′52″W
- Built: 1852
- NRHP reference No.: 74000735
- Added to NRHP: May 01, 1974

Goodale's Cutoff formed a spur of the Oregon Trail beginning in Idaho, United States. The cutoff left the trail near Fort Hall, crossed the Snake River Plain to the Lost River, and then turned west to the area of Boise, crossing Camas Prairie. It rejoined the main trail from Ditto Creek to Boise, then ran to the north of the main trail, crossing the Snake River into Oregon at Brownlee's Ferry. In Oregon travelers could now reach the Eagle Valley and Pine Valley areas, and the gold mines in Auburn. The cutoff rejoined the main Oregon Trail at the Powder River, near Baker City.

In 1852, John Jeffrey began promoting a trail following traditional Shoshoni paths in order to generate business for his ferry on the Blackfoot River. The cutoff received limited use from 1852–54. By 1862, the Northern Shoshone and Bannock tribes were beginning to resist the intrusion of settlers into their homeland, and that year Shoshone Indians ambushed a wagon train at Massacre Rock, killing 10 people. During 1862 Tim Goodale led a group of 1,095 people, 338 wagons, and 2,900 head of stock safely from Fort Hall to Old Fort Boise on the cutoff pioneered by Jeffrey. By 1863, seven out of every ten wagons en route from Fort Hall to Boise took Goodale's Cutoff instead of the main Oregon Trail. Goodale's Cutoff is visible at many points along U.S. Highway 20, U.S. Highway 26, and U.S. Highway 93 between Craters of the Moon National Monument and Carey

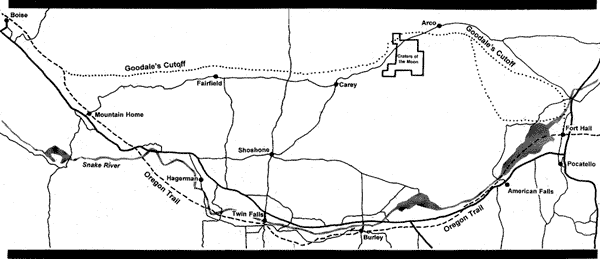
Goodale's Cuttoff 1862

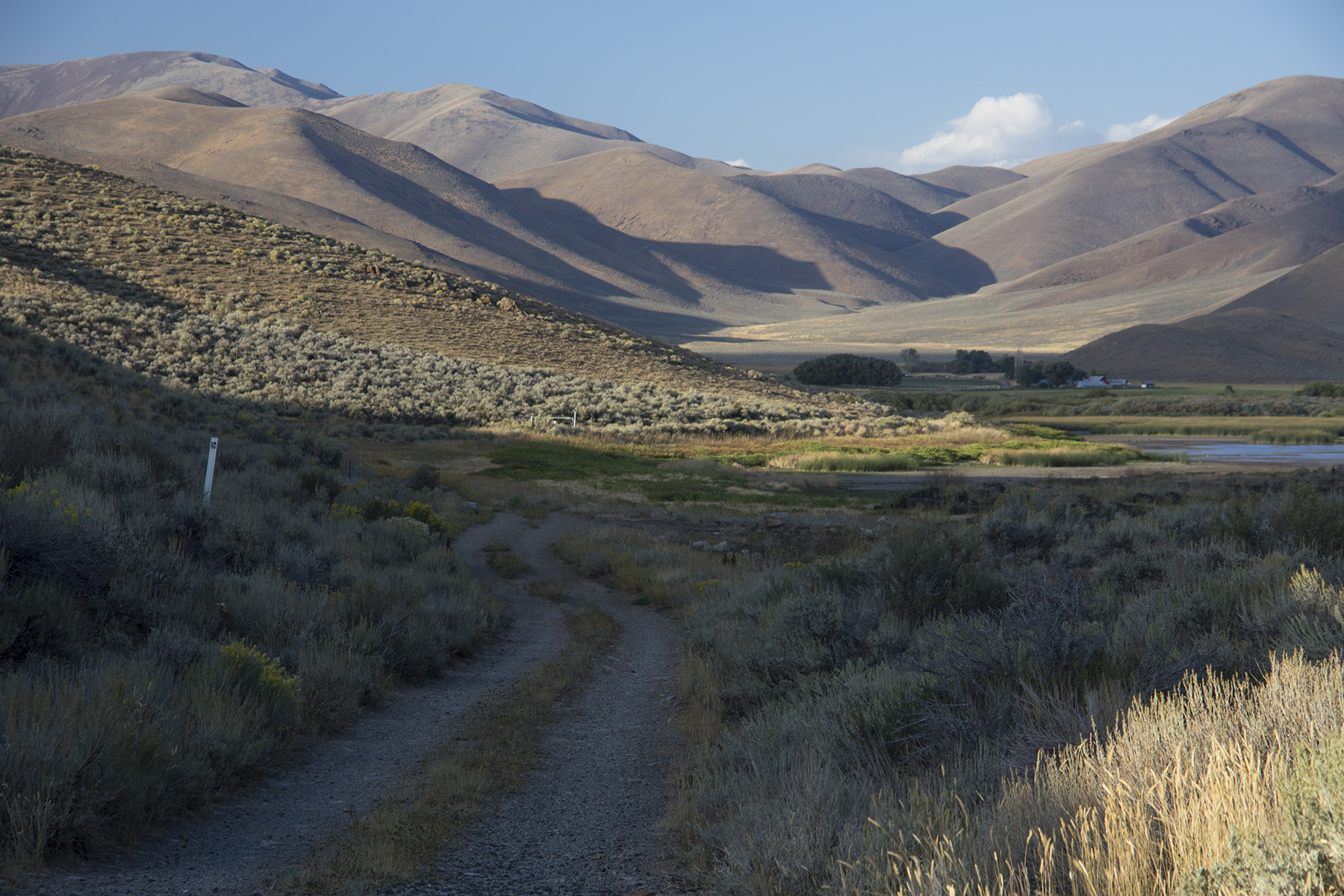
Goodale's Cutoff of the Oregon Trail at Lava Lake, west of Arco, ID and east of Carey, ID along US Highway 26
