= Robinette, Oregon =

- Former unincorporated community
- Location within Oregon Location within the United States
- Coordinates: 44°45′10″N 117°01′50″W
- Country: United States
- State: Oregon
- County: Baker
- Elevation: 2,077 ft (633 m)
- Time zone: UTC-8 (Pacific (PST))
  - Summer (DST): UTC-7 (PDT)
- GNIS feature ID: 1126115

Robinette is a former unincorporated community in Baker County, Oregon, United States.

Robinette was platted around 1898, along a Northwest Railway Company line that never developed. In 1909, a railroad station and townsite at this locale were named for James E. Robinette, a native of Maryland. Robinette came to what was then Union County in 1884 and settled on the west bank of the Snake River near the mouth of the Powder River in 1887. Robinette post office was also established in 1909.

By 1940, when Robinette had a population of 46, it was the northern terminus of a branch line of the Union Pacific Railroad (Oregon Short Line) that ran along the Snake River from Huntington, and served the Pine Valley and Eagle Valley agricultural areas to the north. The line had previously extended 25 miles (40 km) further north to Homestead, but that section, which was used to haul ore from the Cornucopia area mines, was later abandoned and the railroad grade was converted into a highway. The Robinette railhead of the Union Pacific branch line "probably generated most of the freight hauled by the railroad."

The townsite is now under the water of the Brownlee Reservoir, which was created by the damming of the Snake River by the Brownlee Dam in 1958. Before the flooding, the Robinette Store was moved to Richland, where it still stands today. Richland, the closest city to Robinette, was formerly accessible by a road along the Powder River that has since been flooded by the reservoir. The post office was closed in 1957. As of 2010, the United States Geological Survey still classified Robinette as a populated place.

Robinette was home to the Stil-Van Lumber Company from 1949 until just prior to the town being flooded. Marion Dale Stillwell sold the company, including timber rights, to Ellingson Lumber Company from Baker City. Stillwell also received compensation when the Robinette facility flooded.
