= Rubus bartonianus =

- Flower and leaves, Payette National Forest, Idaho

Scientific classification
- Kingdom: Plantae
- Clade: Tracheophytes
- Clade: Angiosperms
- Clade: Eudicots
- Clade: Rosids
- Order: Rosales
- Family: Rosaceae
- Genus: Rubus
- Species: R. bartonianus

Binomial name
- Rubus bartonianus M.Peck 1934

Species of plant

Rubus bartonianus, or Barton's raspberry, is an uncommon North American species of flowering plant in the rose family.

== Description ==
The shrub grows up to 3 metres (10 ft) tall, with deciduous leaves up to 5 centimetres (2 in) long. The flowers have five white petals, which are each 2.5 cm (1 in) long. The dark red fruit resembles a raspberry.

== Taxonomy ==
The species is named for Mrs. Ralph Barton of Wallowa County, Oregon, who brought the plant to the attention of botanist Morton Eaton Peck.

The genetics of Rubus is extremely complex, so that it is difficult to decide on which groups should be recognized as species. There are many rare species with limited ranges such as this. Further study is suggested to clarify the taxonomy.

== Distribution and habitat ==
It is found only in north-central Idaho and northeastern Oregon in the northwestern United States. It grows near streams and on rocky slopes in partial shade and after fire.

== Uses ==
The fruit is edible.
