= Hells Canyon =

Canyon in the western United States

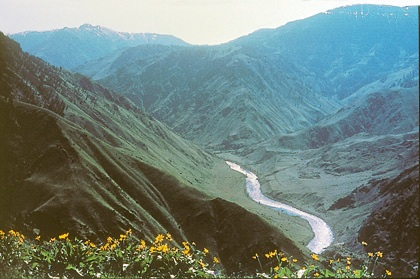
- Snake River flowing through the canyon

- Location within the United States Location within Idaho

Geography
- Country: United States
- States: Idaho; Oregon, Washington
- County: Adams County, Idaho; Idaho County, Idaho; Wallowa County, Oregon, Asotin County, Washington
- Coordinates: 45°22′17″N 116°38′18″W
- River: Snake
- Interactive map of Hells Canyon

Hells Canyon is a ten-mile-wide (16 km) canyon in the Western United States, along the border of eastern Oregon, western Idaho, and a small section of eastern Washington. It is part of the Hells Canyon National Recreation Area which is also located in part of the Wallowa-Whitman National Forest. It is North America's deepest river gorge at 7,993 feet (2,436 m), running deeper than the Grand Canyon in Arizona.

The canyon was carved by the waters of the Snake River, which flows more than one mile (1.6 km) below the canyon's west rim on the Oregon side and 7,400 feet (2,260 m) below the peaks of Idaho's Seven Devils Mountains to the east. This area includes 214,000 acres (334 sq mi; 870 km^{2}) of wilderness; most of the area is inaccessible by road.

== Geology ==
The geologic history of the rocks of Hells Canyon began 300 million years ago with an arc of volcanoes that emerged from the waters of the Pacific Ocean. Over millions of years, the volcanoes subsided and limestone built up on the underwater platforms. The basins between them were filled with sedimentary rock. Between 130 and 17 million years ago, the ocean plate carrying the volcanoes collided with and became part of the North American continent. A period of volcanic activity followed, and much of the area was covered with floods of basalt lava, which smoothed the topography into a high plateau.

Area rivers began carving Hells Canyon out of the plateau about 6 million years ago. Water from Lake Idaho overtopped a natural divide between it and the Salmon River around 3 million years ago, allowing the Snake River to flow through the plateau and further carve the canyon. A 2025 study concludes that the canyon is younger than previously thought, beginning only 1.6 million years ago. Significant canyon-shaping events occurred as recently as 15,000 years ago during a massive outburst flood from Lake Bonneville in Utah. The canyon rim contains dense forests, scenic overlooks and mountain peaks. At the bottom of the canyon, the area is a dry, desert environment.

== History ==
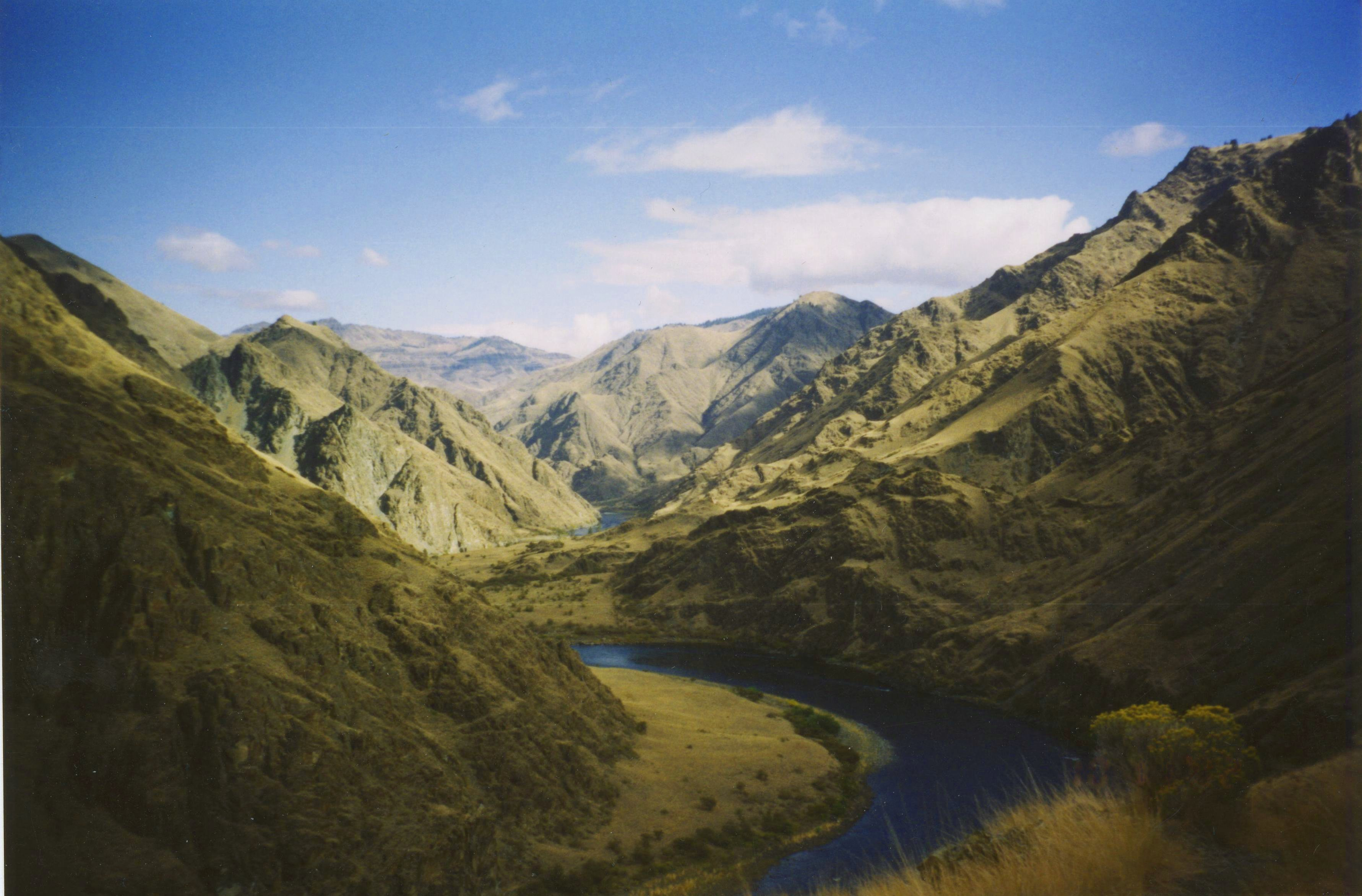
Snake River winding through Hells Canyon

=== Inhabitants ===
The earliest known residents in Hells Canyon were the Nez Percé tribe. Others tribes visiting the area were the Shoshone-Bannock, northern Paiute and Cayuse Indians. The mild winters and ample plant and wildlife attracted human habitation. Pictographs and petroglyphs on the walls of the canyon are a record of the Indian settlements.

In 1806, three members of the Lewis and Clark Expedition entered the Hells Canyon region along the Salmon River. They turned back without seeing the deep parts of the canyon. It was not until 1811 that the Wilson Price Hunt expedition explored Hells Canyon while seeking a shortcut to the Columbia River. Hunger and cold forced them to turn back, as also did many explorers who were defeated by the canyon's inaccessibility. There remains no evidence in the canyon of their attempts; their expedition journals are the only documentation. Early explorers sometimes called this area Box Canyon or Snake River Canyon.

The early miners were next to follow. In the 1860s, gold was discovered in river bars near present-day Hells Canyon National Recreation Area, and miners soon penetrated Hells Canyon; however, gold mining there was not profitable. Evidence of their endeavors remains visible along the corridor of the Snake River. Later efforts concentrated on hard-rock mining, requiring complex facilities. Evidence of these developments is visible today, especially near the mouth of the Imnaha River.

In the 1880s there was a short-lived homesteading boom, but the weather was unsuited to farming and ranching, and most settlers soon gave up. However, some ranchers still operate within the boundaries of the National Recreation Area.

In May 1887, 34 Chinese gold miners were ambushed and killed in the area and thousands of dollars in gold was stolen. This event is known as the Hells Canyon Massacre. One of the claimed participants confessed in 1888, but three of the accused were found not guilty at trial.

=== Damming the Snake River ===
After completion of large hydropower dams on the Columbia River in the 1930s through the 1950s, several entities sought approval from the Federal Power Commission to build dams on the Snake River, including a high dam in Hells Canyon. In 1955, the commission issued a license to the Idaho Power Company to build a three-dam complex in the canyon:

- The first of the three, Brownlee Dam, at river mile (RM) 285 or river kilometer (RK) 459, was finished in 1960.
- Oxbow Dam, twelve miles (20 km) downstream, was finished in 1972.

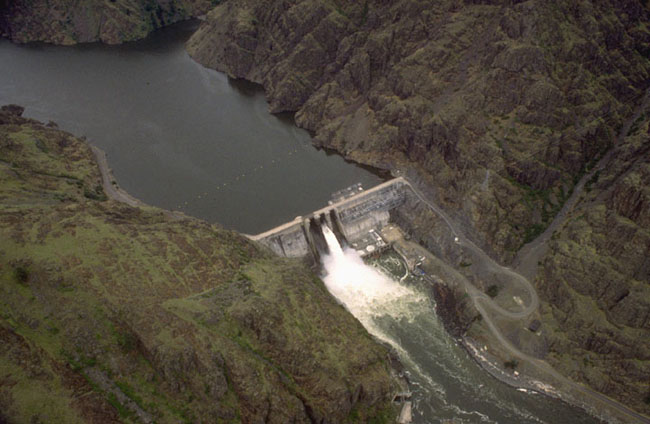
Hells Canyon Dam

- Hells Canyon Dam, 26 miles (42 km) below Oxbow, was completed in 1967.

The three dams have a combined generating capacity of 1,167 megawatts (MW) of electricity. The complex, which provides about 70 percent of Idaho's hydroelectricity, blocks migration of salmon and other anadromous fish upstream of Hells Canyon Dam.

Two additional dams, Mountain Sheep and Pleasant Valley, were proposed in 1955 above the mouth of the Salmon River and below the Hells Canyon Dam. The Wild and Scenic Rivers Act of 1968 held up progress, but with the energy crisis, they were revived in 1975; these projects were sponsored by consortiums Pacific Northwest Power Company and Washington Public Power Supply System (WPPSS). At the end of that year, President Gerald Ford signed legislation to create the Hells Canyon National Recreation Area and the projects were terminated.

The first river runners were on the canyon rapids by 1928.

== Recreation ==
In 1975, Congress had declared 652,000 acres (1,019 sq mi; 2,640 km^{2}) to be the recreational area for the Hells Canyon National Forest. There are many recreational activities available within the canyon. Activities in Hells Canyon include fishing, jet boat tours, hunting, hiking, camping, and whitewater sports (mainly rafting and kayaking). Much of these activities rely on the mighty Snake River, which is the main factor in the creation of Hells Canyon. The Snake River is home to numerous fish species, an abundance of class I-IV rapids (some of the largest in the Pacific Northwest), diverse wildlife and miles of systems. There is one boat ramp that is located at the upper end of the Snake River. The wildlife is made up of over 350 species and this includes big game, small game, bird, and waterfowl hunting. Trophy hunting in this area consists of elk, mountain goats, mountain lions, mule deer, whitetail deer, and black bears. These key components make Hells Canyon an outdoor recreation mecca that brings in tourists from around the world. Hells Canyon offers tours year round, while most of the whitewater activities peak in summer months. To participate in these recreational activities one can utilize commercial charters or private trips.

== Access ==
There are three roads that lead to the Snake River between Hells Canyon Dam and the Oregon-Washington state line. There are no bridges that cross Hells Canyon. From Oxbow Bridge near Copperfield, Oregon, Hells Canyon Road follows the Idaho side of the river 22 miles (35 km) downstream to the Hells Canyon Dam. The road crosses the dam and continues another mile to the Hells Canyon Visitor Center on the Oregon side.

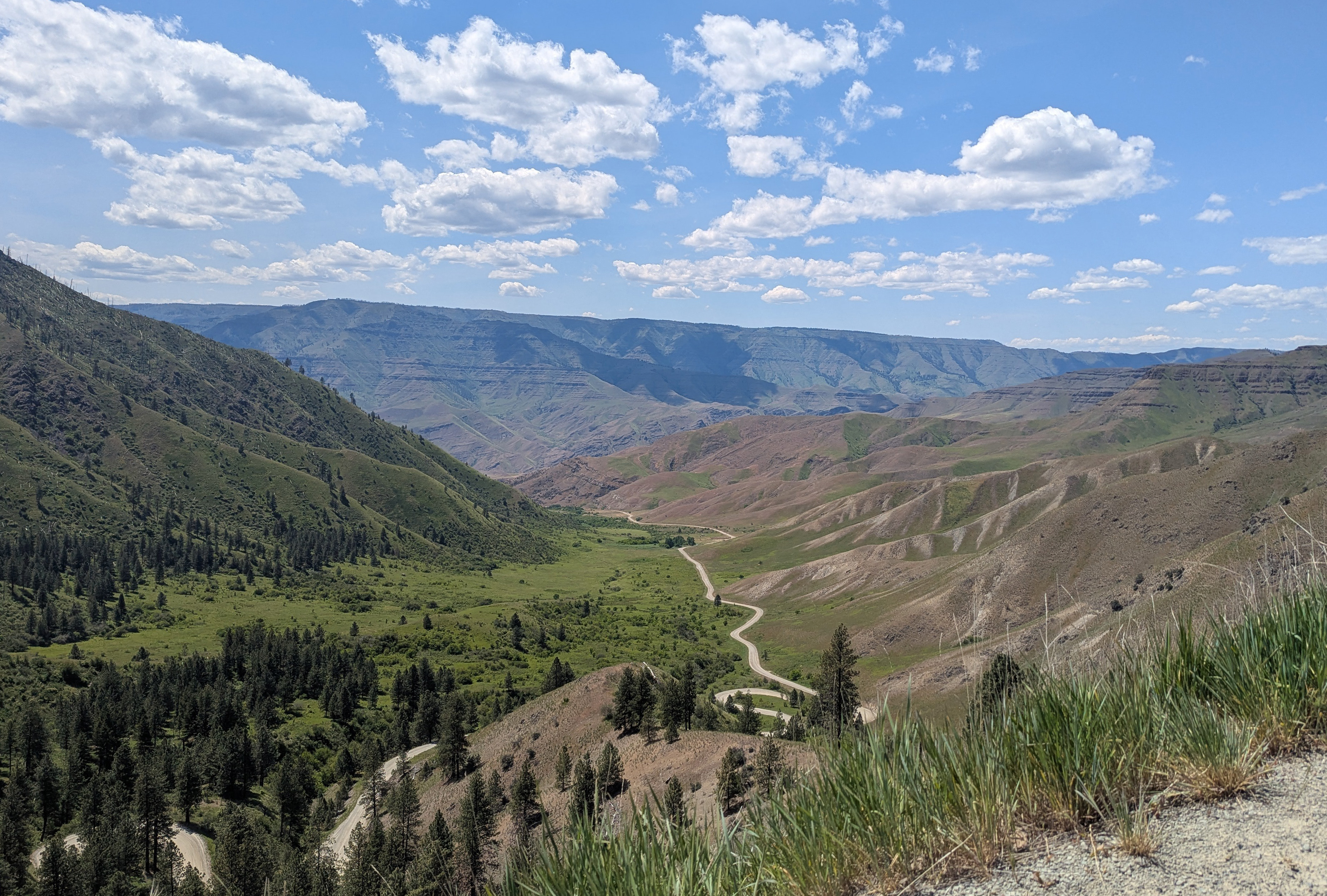
Deer Creek Road looking west to Pittsburg Landing

Farther north on the Idaho side, Deer Creek Road connects White Bird to the river at Pittsburg Landing. Near the northern end of the canyon, Forest Road 4260 (Lower Imnaha Road), the last part of which is too rough for most cars, reaches the river at Dug Bar, 21 miles (34 km) from Imnaha, Oregon. On the canyon rims, viewpoints accessible by road include Hat Point and Buckhorn in Oregon and Heavens Gate in Idaho.

== See also ==
- Hells Canyon Wilderness (Oregon and Idaho)
- List of plants endemic to Hells Canyon

== Works cited ==
- Orr, Elizabeth L., and Orr, William N. (1999). Geology of Oregon, fifth edition. Dubuque, Iowa: Kendall/Hunt Publishing Company. ISBN 0-7872-6608-6.
- Sullivan, William L. (2002). Exploring Oregon's Wild Areas, third edition. Seattle: The Mountaineers Press. ISBN 0-89886-793-2.
