= National Oldtime Fiddlers' Contest =

Coordinates: 44.261°N 116.979°W

Location in the United States
Location in Idaho

The National Oldtime Fiddlers' Contest is an old-time music competition, festival, and musical gathering in the western United States, held annually during the third full week in June in Weiser, Idaho, about fifty miles (80 km) northwest of Boise. Within the fiddling community, it is often referred to simply as "Weiser"; the contest draws musicians from across the country. Nearly 7,000 attend for the week and almost 350 fiddlers compete in eight divisions. In addition to the contest there are workshops, performances, a battle of the bands, a parade and a carnival. The contest is held at Weiser High School: the competition is held in the gymnasium, and most of the contestants camp in the school's sports fields.

== History ==
The contest began 72 years ago in 1953 as the Northwest Mountain Fiddlers' Contest, organized by Blaine Stubblefield, secretary of the Weiser Chamber of Commerce. The contest increased in size each year, and competitors came from farther away. The name was changed to the Northwest Oldtime Fiddling Championships in 1956, when a regional division was added for out-of-area fiddlers.

In 1963, the present National Oldtime Fiddlers' Contest was inaugurated. The contest has continued to grow since then, and now sets the standard for fiddling competitions across the nation.

== Style ==
The dominant style of fiddling that is played in the competition is Texas Contest Style, although there are many other fiddling styles which are played during jam sessions that last well into the night. There are also performances on the contest stage between rounds of competition, where the fiddling styles range from swing to bluegrass to Celtic.

== Rules ==
Each fiddler plays a set (or 'round') of three tunes, which must include a hoedown, a waltz, and a tune of choice, which can neither be a waltz nor a hoedown. The fiddlers with the highest scores move on to the next round of competition. The number of fiddlers that get to play in each round is decided before the contest starts. In all divisions, only five fiddlers compete in the final round of competition and scores are cumulative throughout the contest.

The contest is divided into seven divisions: Small Fry, for contestants 8 years of age and younger; Junior-Junior, for contestants 12 years of age and younger; Junior, for contestants less than 18 years of age; Young Adult, for ages 18–36; Adult, ages 37–59; Senior, ages 60 and above; and Grand Champion, which is open to competitors of any age. No competitor may enter more than one of these divisions. There is no competition between divisions. There are three rounds of competition for the Small Fry and Junior-Junior divisions, four for the Junior, Young Adult, Adult, and Senior divisions, and six for the Grand Championship.

If a contestant wins an age specific division three times, they can no longer compete in that division, but they may play in the next most competitive division the next year (Small Fry and Junior-Junior move up to the next age group, all other ages move up to the Grand Championship). If a fiddler wins the Grand Championship three years, they are asked to sit out a year, and are invited to judge the contest instead of competing.

Contestants may perform with up to three accompanists, and no contestant may play the same tune twice. There is a time limit of four minutes for rounds one through three, five minutes for rounds four and five, and no time limit for the final round of the Grand Champion division. All contestants must use the microphone provided. No sheet music is allowed on stage and there is no "trick" or "fancy fiddling", nor can there be any cross tuning on stage. Anyone may enter the contest.

== Judging ==
The judging criteria are: oldtime fiddling style, danceability, rhythm and timing, and tone quality. A simple tune, played well, is scored higher than a difficult tune that is played poorly. There are five judges and each gives up to a maximum score of 100 for each tune a fiddler plays. The highest and lowest scores for the round are thrown out, leaving the middle three round scores to be added to a player's cumulative total (a perfect score for one round is 900). The judges are often fiddlers who have won the Grand Championship in the past, or fiddlers who are well known in other styles of fiddle music.

To reduce bias, judging is done from a room away from the competition area; judges only hear the number of the competitor and the performance, but this does not prevent judges from recognizing fiddlers by their style. The exception is the final round of the Grand Championship, with the judges in the front row, next to the stage.

== See also ==
- List of folk festivals
