= Robert Brownlee Observatory =

Observatory in California, US

- Organization: Mountain Skies Astronomical Society
- Location: Lake Arrowhead, California, United States
- Coordinates: 34°13′51″N 117°12′35″W
- Website: www.mountain-skies.org/RBO.html

Robert Brownlee Observatory (RBO) is an astronomical observatory owned and operated by the Mountain Skies Astronomical Society (MSAS). It is located in Lake Arrowhead, California, USA.

The observatory was named for Robert Gregg Brownlee, a biochemist.

== See also ==
- List of observatories
