= Brownlee Dam =

Dam on the Idaho-Oregon border

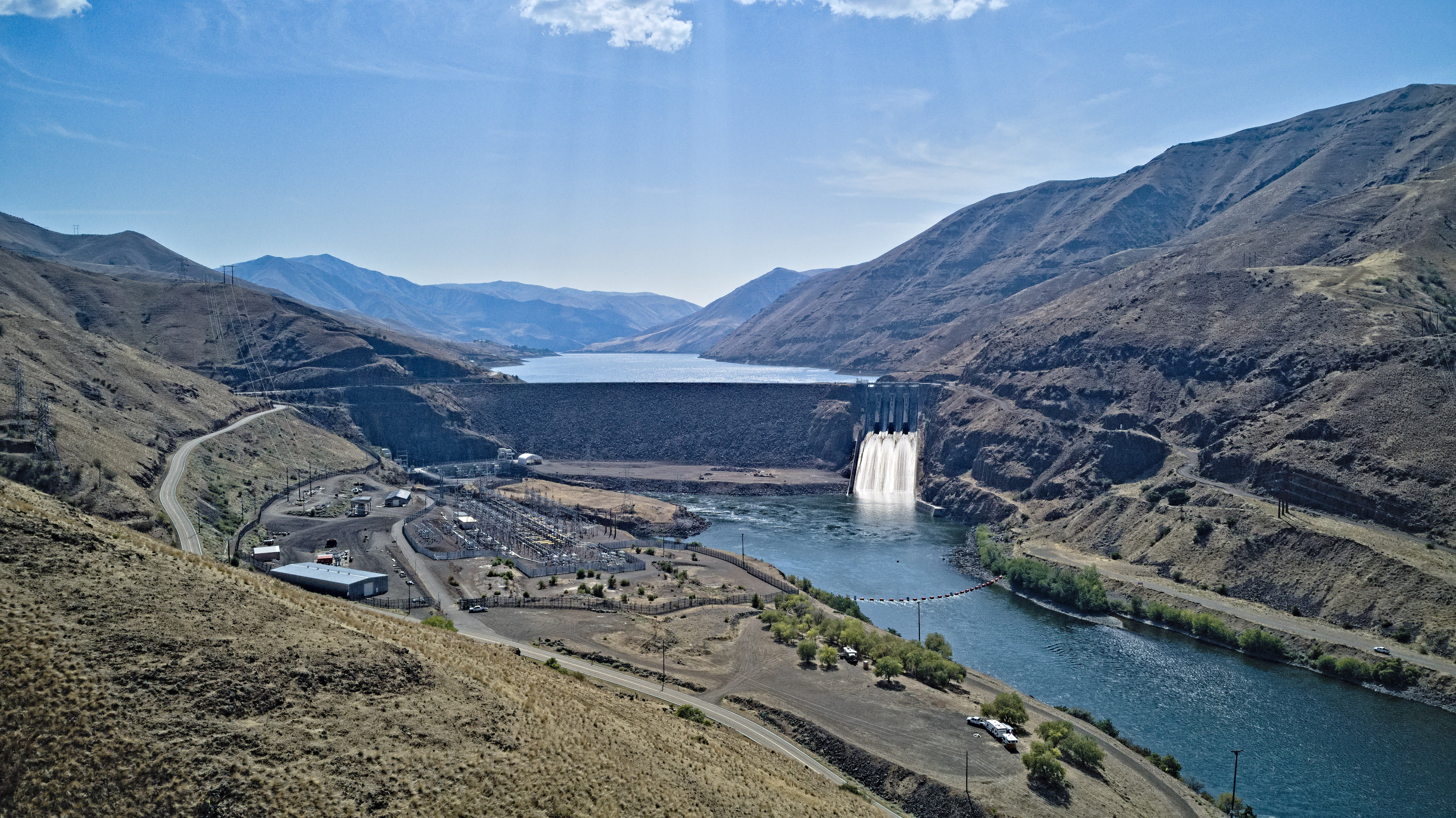
- View from northeast in August 2025

- Location within the United States Location within Idaho
- Official name: Brownlee Dam
- Country: United States
- Location: Hells Canyon, Baker Co., Oregon / Washington Co., Idaho
- Coordinates: 44.836°N 116.9°W
- Construction began: 1955
- Opening date: May 9, 1958; 68 years ago
- Operator: Idaho Power Company

Dam and spillways
- Impounds: Snake River
- Height: 420 feet (128 m)

Reservoir
- Creates: Brownlee Reservoir
- Total capacity: 1,426,700 acre-feet (1.7598 km^{3})
- Catchment area: 72,590 square miles (188,000 km^{2})
- Surface area: 15,000 acres (61 km^{2})
- Normal elevation: 2,070 feet (630 m)

Power Station
- Installed capacity: 585.4 MW
- Annual generation: 2,406.8 GWh
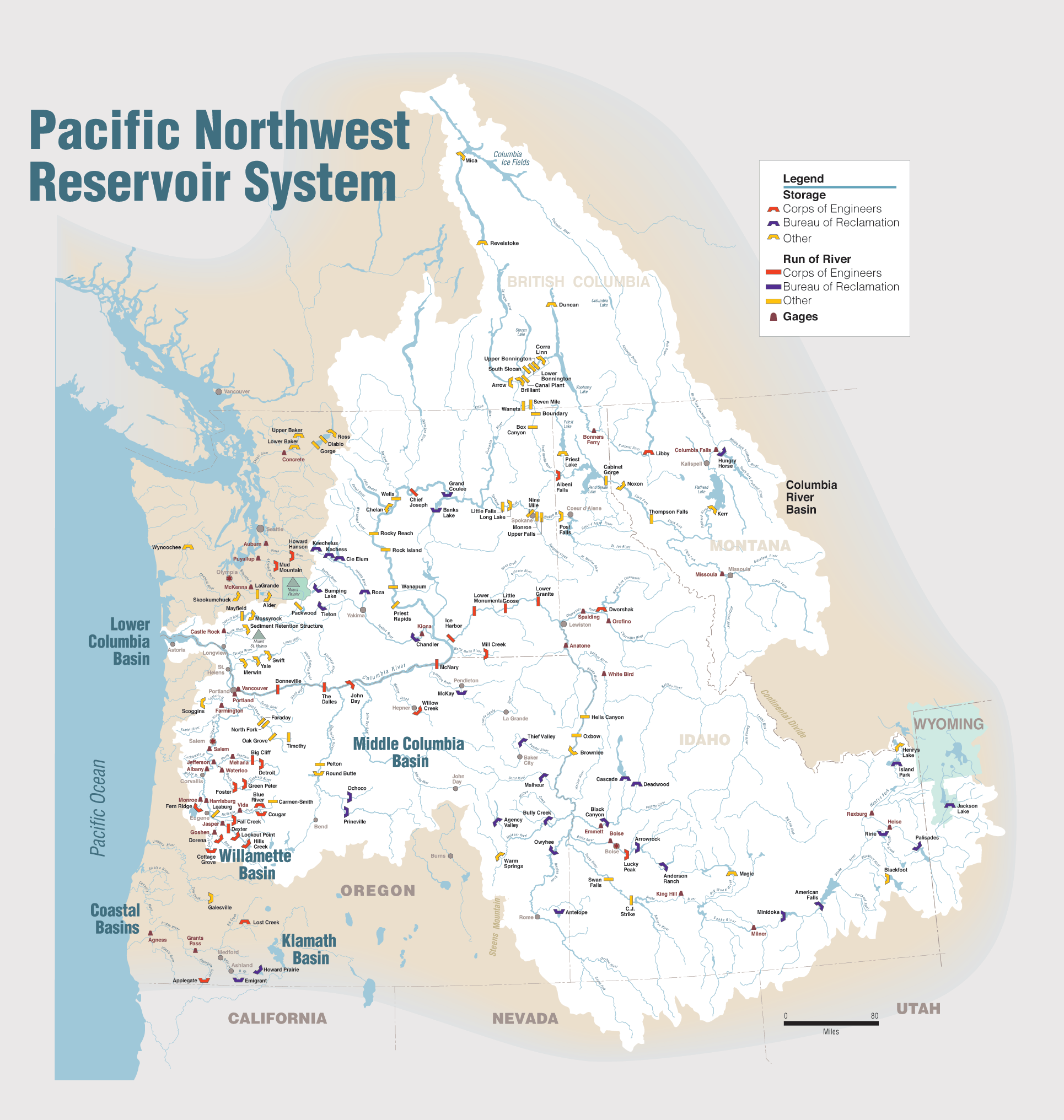
- Columbia River Basin

Brownlee Dam is a hydroelectric earth fill embankment dam in the western United States, on the Snake River along the Idaho-Oregon border (Washington County, Idaho in and Baker County in Oregon). In Hells Canyon at river mile 285, it impounds the Snake River in the 58-mile-long (93 km) Brownlee Reservoir.

== Description ==
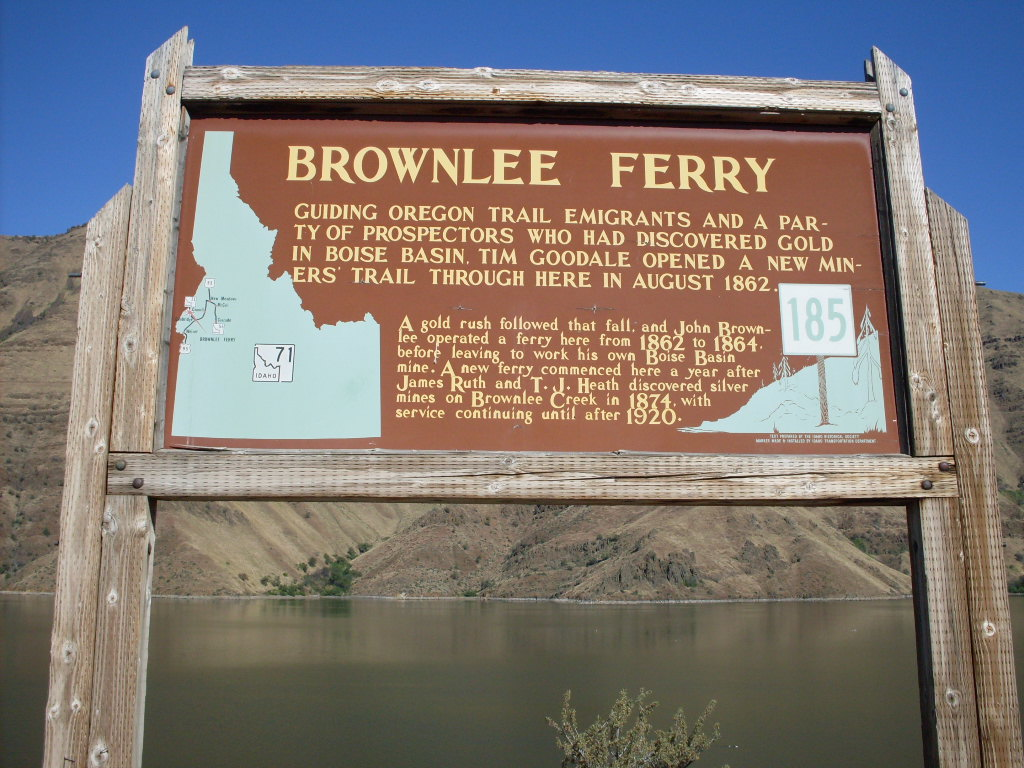
Namesake of the Brownlee Dam & Reservoir, July 2008

The dam is part of the Hells Canyon Project that also includes Hells Canyon Dam and Oxbow Dam, all built and operated by Idaho Power Company. The first and upper-most of the three dams, its contractor was Morrison-Knudsen of Boise. Filling started 68 years ago on May 9, 1958, flooding the community of Robinette, Oregon.

The dam's powerhouse contains five generating units with a total nameplate capacity of 585.4 megawatts.

Lacking passage for migrating salmon and other migratory species, the three Hells Canyon Project dams blocked access by anadromous salmonids (and Pacific lamprey) to a stretch of the Snake River drainage basin from Hells Canyon Dam up to Swan Falls Dam (constructed in 1901). Prior to the construction of Brownlee Dam, Swan Falls prevented migrating salmon, lamprey and other species from reaching Shoshone Falls, which naturally prevents any upstream fish passage to the upper Snake River basin.

== Heliport ==
There is a 100-by-60-foot (30 by 18 m) private heliport, Brownlee Heliport (FAA LID: OR75), located near the dam.

== See also ==
- Brownlee, Oregon, the dam's namesake, was located about two miles upstream.
- List of dams in the Columbia River watershed
- List of dams and reservoirs in Idaho
- List of lakes of Oregon
