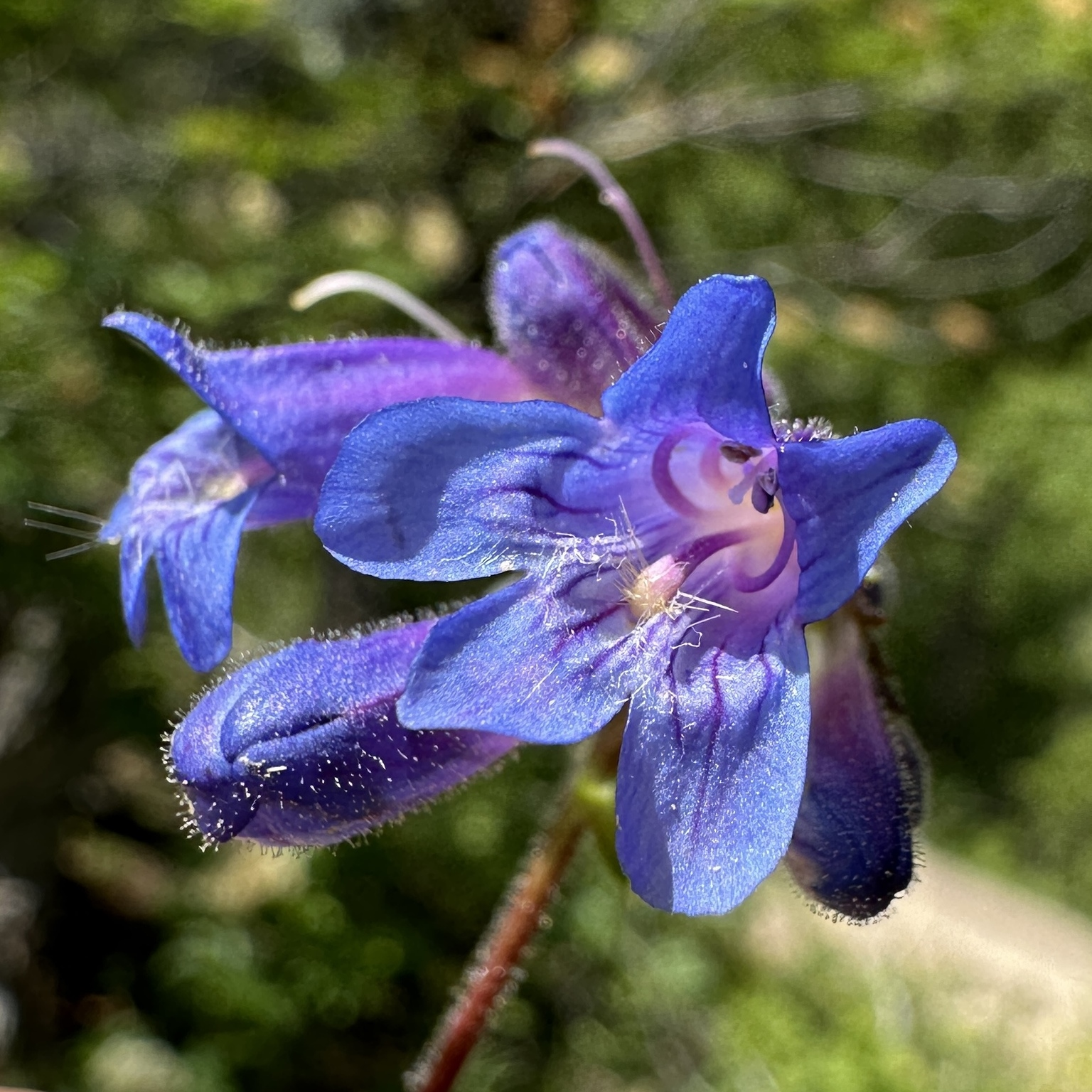

Scientific classification
- Kingdom: Plantae
- Clade: Embryophytes
- Clade: Tracheophytes
- Clade: Spermatophytes
- Clade: Angiosperms
- Clade: Eudicots
- Clade: Asterids
- Order: Lamiales
- Family: Plantaginaceae
- Genus: Penstemon
- Species: P. wilcoxii

Binomial name
- Penstemon wilcoxii Rydb.

= Penstemon wilcoxii =

Species of plant

Penstemon wilcoxii is a species of flowering plant in the family Plantaginaceae. It is commonly called Wilcox's penstemon.

== Description ==
Its bilabiate flowers range from vivid blue to violet with small silvery hairs covering petals and stems.

== Range ==
Penstemon wilcoxii can be found in Montana and Oregon in the Western United States, in open or forested regions.
