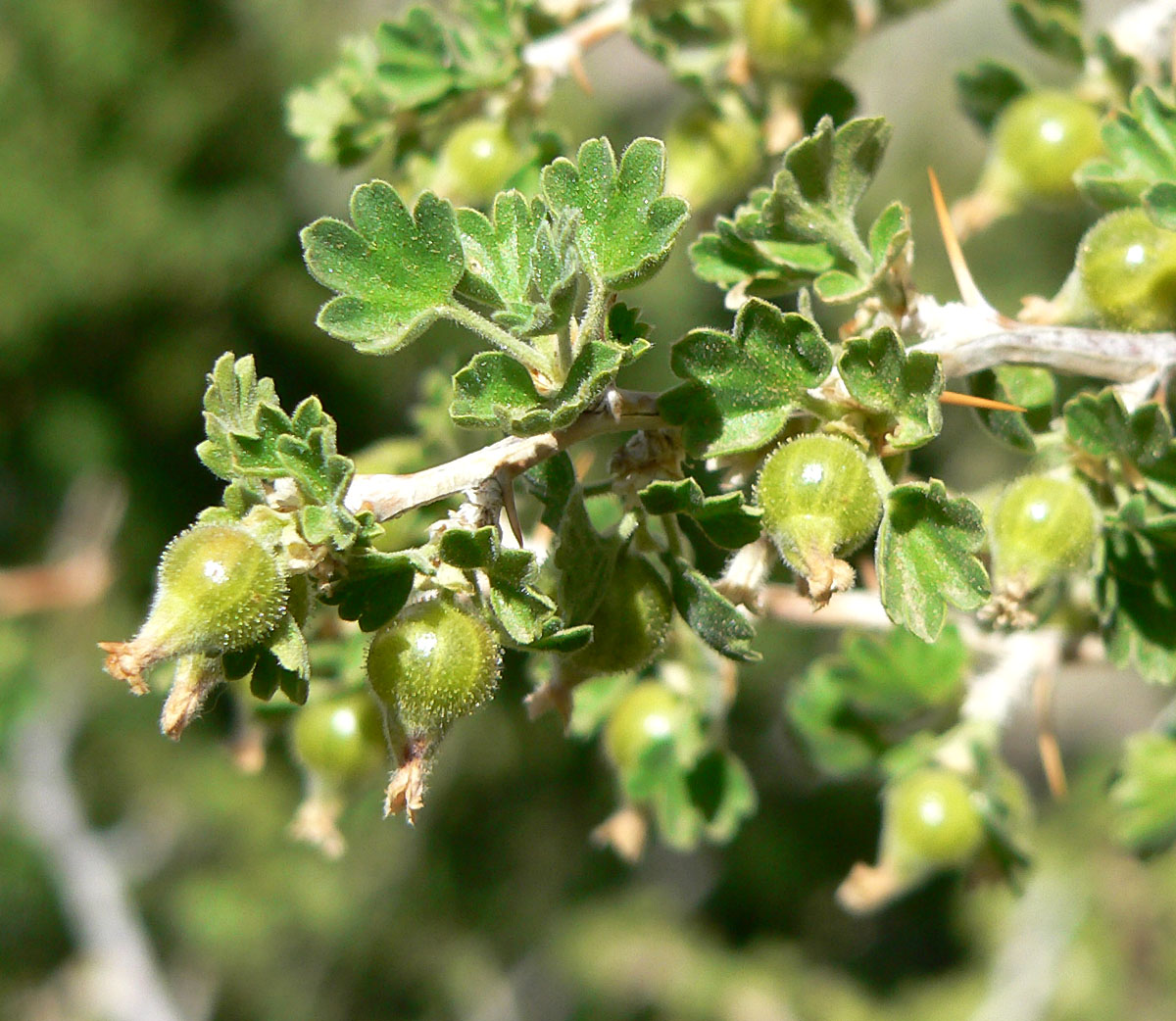

Scientific classification
- Kingdom: Plantae
- Clade: Tracheophytes
- Clade: Angiosperms
- Clade: Eudicots
- Order: Saxifragales
- Family: Grossulariaceae
- Genus: Ribes
- Species: R. velutinum

Binomial name
- Ribes velutinum Greene

Varieties
- Ribes velutinum var. gooddingii (M.Peck) C.L.Hitchc.

Synonyms
- Grossularia velutina (Greene) Coville & Britton; Ribes goodingii M.E.Peck

= Ribes velutinum =

Desert gooseberry

Species of flowering plant

Ribes velutinum is a North American species of currant known by the common name desert gooseberry.

== Description ==
Ribes velutinum is a spreading shrub growing to 2 metres (6 1/2 ft) in height. It has a thick, arching, multibranched stem growing up to 2 metres (6 1/2 ft) long. Nodes along the stems are armed with spines that may reach 2 centimetres (3/4 in) in length. These are not 'prickles', as they are derived from leaf material rather than plant epidermis (skin).

The thick, leathery leaves have generally rounded blades divided shallowly into three or five lobes and dotted with glandular hairs. The small blades are borne on petioles.

The inflorescence is a solitary flower or raceme of up to four flowers. Each small flower is a tube of white or yellowish sepals with smaller, similarly colored petals inside. The bloom period is April to May.

The fruit is a berry 0.5–1 cm (1/4–3/8 in) wide, which ripens yellow, then reddish or purple. It is dry and unpalatable.

== Varieties ==
- Ribes velutinum var. goodingii — Gooding's gooseberry, from the Great Basin region in California, Nevada, Idaho, Washington, and Oregon

== Distribution and habitat ==
It is endemic to the deserts and mountains of the Western United States. It is native to areas in Montana, Idaho, Washington, Oregon, Utah, Nevada, California, and Arizona.

It grows in many types of habitat, including sagebrush scrub, pinyon–juniper woodland, and yellow pine forest.
