= Homestead, Oregon =

Unincorporated community in the state of Oregon, United States

- Unincorporated community
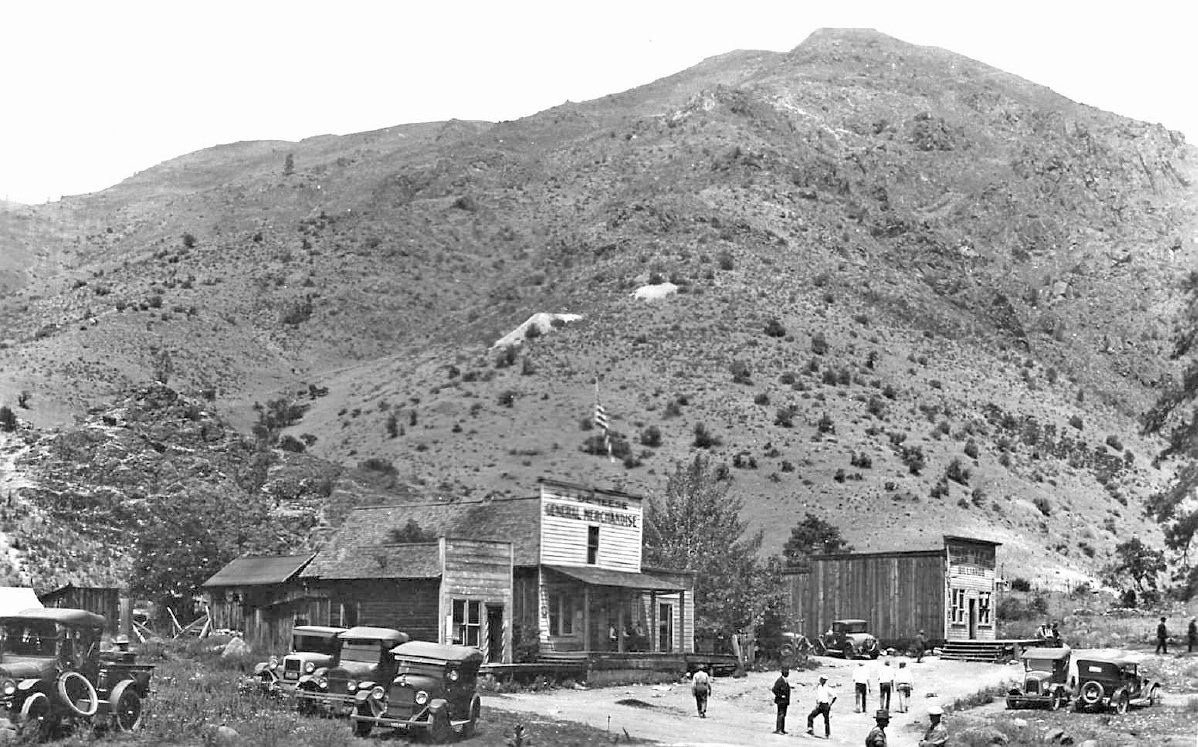
- Homestead (circa 1915-1925)

- Location within Oregon Location within the United States
- Coordinates: 45°01′26″N 116°51′03″W
- Country: United States
- State: Oregon
- County: Baker
- Elevation: 1,742 ft (531 m)
- Time zone: UTC-8 (Pacific (PST))
  - Summer (DST): UTC-7 (PDT)
- Area codes: 458 and 541
- GNIS feature ID: 1121943

Homestead is an unincorporated community in Baker County, in the U.S. state of Oregon. Homestead lies on the Snake River south of Hells Canyon National Recreation Area and about 4 miles (6 km) north of Copperfield and Oxbow.

The community was named for the homestead claim of Frank E. Pearce, who conducted operations at the nearby Iron Dyke Mine around 1900. J. H. Pearson was the first postmaster of the Homestead post office, which operated until May 1, 1965. The post office at Oxbow then replaced the office at Homestead.

Homestead was platted around 1898 along a Northwest Railway Company line that never developed. It thrived because of the patronage of the miners from the Iron Dyke Mine and because it was the railhead for local orchards.

From 1953 to 1960, Homestead was the starting point for passenger boat trips down the Snake River to Lewiston, Idaho operated by Blaine Stubblefield.
