= Copperfield, Oregon =

- Former unincorporated community
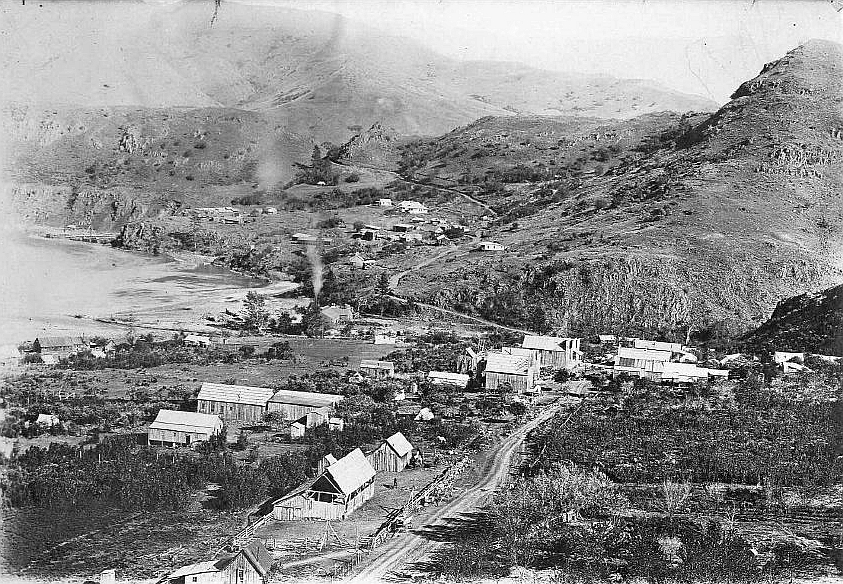
- Copperfield, 1907

- Location within Oregon Location within the United States
- Coordinates: 44°58′22″N 116°51′27″W
- Country: United States
- State: Oregon
- County: Baker
- Elevation: 1,722 ft (525 m)
- Time zone: UTC−08:00 (Pacific (PST))
  - Summer (DST): UTC−07:00 (PDT)
- Area codes: 458 and 541
- GNIS feature ID for Copperfield Campground: 1156619

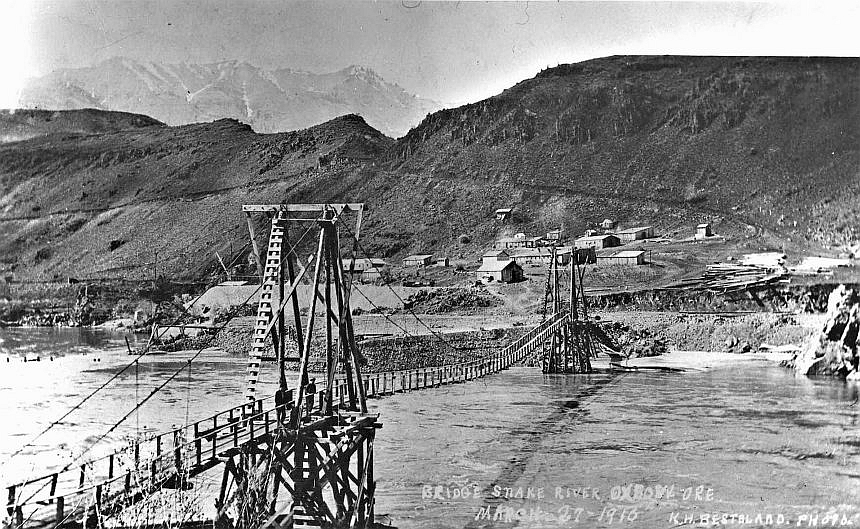
Bridge across Snake River at Copperfield, 1916

Copperfield is a former town in Baker County, in the U.S. state of Oregon. It is on the west bank of the Snake River and the north bank of Pine Creek, downstream of a feature of the Snake River known as The Oxbow. Copperfield Park, managed by Idaho Power, occupies the former town site. The Geographic Names Information System also lists Copperfield as a variant name for Oxbow, Oregon.

== Early history ==
According to the historian Lewis McArthur, the town was formed in the late 1890s as "Copper Camp", and was inhabited by prospectors of the local copper ore; However, the Oregon writer Stewart Holbrook asserted that "there was no copper in Copperfield", and that the community "had one purpose; namely, to cater to the uninhibited appetites of more than two thousand men who were engaged on two nearby construction projects."

Copperfield was platted around 1898, along a Northwest Railway Company line that never developed. Soon the locality was known as "Copperfield" and a post office was established in 1899. The population grew to 1,000 by 1910 because two tunnels were being dug near The Oxbow by the local railroad company and by the predecessor of the Idaho Power Company. This railroad activity was described as a "brawling railroad construction camp" during this period by Barbara Ruth Bailey.

== Martial law ==
As Holbrook describes it, "early in 1913 the construction jobs began to peter out. Fewer men were employed. Competition for the remaining trade became stiff. The saloon keepers began feuding." With stories of arson, the town acquired a reputation for lawlessness. When the county authorities failed to get control of the situation, Governor Oswald West announced he was sending his secretary, Fern Hobbs, with a signed declaration of martial law to clean up the place. The locals, who had been led to believe she was travelling alone, were surprised by state militia who had accompanied Hobbs and enforced martial law on the town after she read the declaration to its inhabitants. A few months after Hobbs' intervention, a fire "of unknown origin destroyed a block or two of the jerry-built structures. No saloon ever reopened."

== Ghost town ==
There were two more fires, and then the post office closed in 1927, essentially turning Copperfield into a ghost town. In 1965, however, the community of Oxbow was founded near the site of Copperfield when the Idaho Power Company was building the Oxbow Dam. The former site of Copperfield is now a park run by Idaho Power.
