= Austin, Oregon =

Unincorporated community in the state of Oregon, United States

- Ghost town
- Location within Oregon
- Coordinates: 44.602656°N 118.49661°W
- Country: United States
- State: Oregon
- County: Grant County
- Founded: late 1800s

Austin is an unincorporated community, considered a ghost town, in Grant County, Oregon, United States. It is located north of Oregon Route 7, near the Middle Fork John Day River in the Malheur National Forest.

== History ==
Austin was named for Minot and Linda Austin, early settlers of the area. The Austins operated a small store and hotel, Austin House. Austin House was started as a hotel and stagecoach station by a Mr. Newton. Austin post office was established in 1888 and closed in 1950.

The tracks of the Sumpter Valley Railway reached Austin in 1905. The railway was built by Oregon Lumber Company and Austin became an important railroad logging community. Austin was the hub of the area until Bates, a company town of the Oregon Lumber Company, was built 1 mile (1.6 km) to the west. Austin was also a supply depot for local mining towns, including Susanville and Galena. Austin sawmills supplied lumber for places such as Greenhorn and the Bonanza Mine, higher up in the Blue Mountains. At its height, the population was about 500 (some estimates say it was high as 5,000) and the community had three sawmills. The town also had a substantial jail and the offices of several doctors, lawyers and real estate operators. As the neighboring mining towns disappeared, however, Austin also went into decline.

By 1997, a newer business called Austin House was the only business remaining in the Austin area, at Austin Junction where Oregon Route 7 meets U.S. Route 26. Built in 1959, the business is about 2.5 miles (4.0 km) from the original site of Austin and serves as a combination tavern, grocery store, restaurant and gas station. As of 2002, fewer than 35 people lived within a 5-mile (8.0 km) radius of Austin.

== Climate ==
Climate data for Austin, Oregon, 1991–2020 normals, 1912-2020 extremes: 4213ft (1284m)
Month	Jan	Feb	Mar	Apr	May	Jun	Jul	Aug	Sep	Oct	Nov	Dec	Year
Record high °F (°C)	58 (14)	65 (18)	75 (24)	90 (32)	95 (35)	103 (39)	108 (42)	103 (39)	99 (37)	89 (32)	73 (23)	60 (16)	108 (42)
Mean maximum °F (°C)	49.2 (9.6)	53.4 (11.9)	61.9 (16.6)	73.5 (23.1)	83.5 (28.6)	89.0 (31.7)	95.5 (35.3)	94.4 (34.7)	89.4 (31.9)	76.9 (24.9)	60.2 (15.7)	47.8 (8.8)	95.8 (35.4)
Mean daily maximum °F (°C)	34.4 (1.3)	39.4 (4.1)	46.1 (7.8)	52.9 (11.6)	62.0 (16.7)	71.3 (21.8)	83.4 (28.6)	82.7 (28.2)	73.3 (22.9)	58.5 (14.7)	42.0 (5.6)	33.5 (0.8)	56.6 (13.7)
Daily mean °F (°C)	24.8 (−4.0)	29.0 (−1.7)	34.7 (1.5)	40.4 (4.7)	47.9 (8.8)	54.9 (12.7)	63.3 (17.4)	62.4 (16.9)	54.1 (12.3)	43.3 (6.3)	32.1 (0.1)	24.8 (−4.0)	42.6 (5.9)
Mean daily minimum °F (°C)	15.2 (−9.3)	18.5 (−7.5)	23.2 (−4.9)	27.8 (−2.3)	33.8 (1.0)	38.5 (3.6)	43.2 (6.2)	42.0 (5.6)	34.8 (1.6)	28.2 (−2.1)	22.2 (−5.4)	16.0 (−8.9)	28.6 (−1.9)
Mean minimum °F (°C)	−7.7 (−22.1)	−6.3 (−21.3)	6.1 (−14.4)	15.9 (−8.9)	21.4 (−5.9)	27.3 (−2.6)	31.3 (−0.4)	29.3 (−1.5)	21.4 (−5.9)	12.6 (−10.8)	2.5 (−16.4)	−8.5 (−22.5)	−16.3 (−26.8)
Record low °F (°C)	−52 (−47)	−47 (−44)	−25 (−32)	−1 (−18)	7 (−14)	13 (−11)	15 (−9)	17 (−8)	10 (−12)	−6 (−21)	−29 (−34)	−41 (−41)	−52 (−47)
Average precipitation inches (mm)	2.56 (65)	1.74 (44)	1.92 (49)	1.66 (42)	1.84 (47)	1.62 (41)	0.69 (18)	0.71 (18)	0.79 (20)	1.25 (32)	2.66 (68)	3.32 (84)	20.76 (528)
Average snowfall inches (cm)	22.3 (57)	11.3 (29)	7.1 (18)	2.8 (7.1)	0.4 (1.0)	0.0 (0.0)	0.0 (0.0)	0.0 (0.0)	0.1 (0.25)	0.8 (2.0)	11.1 (28)	26.8 (68)	82.7 (210.35)
Average extreme snow depth inches (cm)	20.7 (53)	21.6 (55)	14.7 (37)	3.3 (8.4)	0.6 (1.5)	0.0 (0.0)	0.0 (0.0)	0.0 (0.0)	0.0 (0.0)	0.7 (1.8)	7.5 (19)	16.0 (41)	26.2 (67)
Source 1: NOAA (1981-2010 snowfall)
Source 2: XMACIS2 (records, 1981-2010 monthly max/mins & snow depth)

== See also ==
- List of ghost towns in Oregon
