= Oregon Route 7 =

State highway in northwestern Oregon, US

Oregon Route 7
- Route 7 highlighted in red

Route information
- Maintained by ODOT
- Length: 52.78 mi (84.94 km)
- Existed: 1932–present
- Component highways: Whitney Highway No. 71; La Grande–Baker Highway No. 66; Baker–Copperfield Highway No 12

Major junctions
- South end: US 26 in Austin Junction
- US 30 in Baker City
- North end: I-84 in Baker City

Location
- Country: United States
- State: Oregon
- Counties: Grant, Baker

Highway system
- Oregon Highways; Interstate; US; State; Named; Scenic
← OR 6	→ OR 8

Oregon Route 7 is an Oregon state highway which runs from Interstate 84 at Baker City to U.S. Route 26 at Austin Junction. OR 7 traverses several highways of the Oregon state highway system: Whitney Highway No. 71, part of the La Grande–Baker Highway No. 66, and part of the Baker–Copperfield Highway No 12. A short spur, Oregon Route 410, serves the city of Sumpter.

== Route description ==
OR 7 has its southern terminus at a junction with U.S. Route 26 at the unincorporated locale of Austin Junction. From Austin Junction, it runs roughly northeast, passing near Bates and Austin, and crossing the Middle Fork John Day River. The route continues northeast through the Malheur National Forest until it crosses the North Fork Burnt River and passes into the Wallowa–Whitman National Forest. The road follows the river roughly eastward until it reaches the community of Whitney, where it turns northeast again. South of Sumpter the route crosses the Powder River—in an area covered with gold dredge tailings—and forms a junction with Oregon Route 410. OR 7 continues southeast along the Powder River and passes Phillips Lake, an impoundment of the river dating from 1968. At its junction with Oregon Route 245 at Salisbury, the route veers north as it continues to follow the river, terminating in Baker City at an interchange with I-84.

== History ==
The route of Oregon Route 7 once followed the current route of Oregon Route 245 to Unity, but it was changed in favor of the Sumpter routing.

== Major intersections ==
Milepoints are as reported by ODOT and do not necessarily reflect current mileage. Z indicates overlapping mileage due to construction longer than established route, and – indicates negative mileage behind established beginning point. Segments that are locally maintained may be omitted. For routes traversing multiple named state highways, each milepoint is preceded by the corresponding state highway number.

County	Location	Milepoint	Destinations	Notes
Grant		71 0.00	US 26 west – Prairie City, John Day US 26 east – Unity, Vale	
Grant		71 6.74	Tipton Summit, elevation 5,124 feet (1,562 m)	
Baker		71 21.48	Larch Summit, elevation 5,082 feet (1,549 m)	
Baker		71 25.23	OR 410 – Sumpter, Granite	
Baker		71 34.15	Viewpoint	
Baker	Salisbury	71 41.85	OR 245 – Unity	
Baker	Baker City	71 50.96 66 52.04	US 30 east – Ontario, Huntington	Southern end of concurrency with US 30
Baker	Baker City	66 51.79 12 0.00	US 30 west – North Baker Business District, Haines, Anthony Lakes	Northern end of concurrency with US 30
Baker	Baker City	12 1.14– 12 1.57	I-84 – Ontario, Richland, Hells Canyon, La Grande	Exit 304 on I-84
1.000 mi = 1.609 km; 1.000 km = 0.621 mi: Concurrency terminus
