= Ghost Mine (TV series) =

- Genre: Paranormal; Reality TV
- Starring: Stan Griffith; Edward Griffith; Keith Leingang; Patrick Doyle; Kristen Luman; Jay Verburg; Jamol Eli; Jared Anderson; Dick Secord; Richard Secord; Mikey Griffith
- Narrated by: Erik Bregmann
- Opening theme: "Proud Man's Soul"
- Country of origin: United States
- Original language: English
- No. of seasons: 2
- No. of episodes: 18

Production
- Executive producers: Mark Cronin; Jay Bluemke; Dave Caplan; Phil Davis
- Producer: Tom Dorman
- Production location: Sumpter, Oregon
- Cinematography: Daniel Cotroneo
- Editors: Dean Kekoolani; Gary Reid; Joe Rogan; Andrew Wardlaw; Mathys Willem; Corey Becker; Tod Modisett
- Camera setup: Multiple
- Running time: 45 minutes
- Production companies: Never Nominated Productions, LLC

Original release
- Network: Syfy
- Release: January 16 – November 20, 2013

Ghost Mine is an American paranormal television series that premiered on January 16, 2013, in the United States on the Syfy channel. The series features a group of hard rock miners searching for gold in Oregon's Crescent Mine. Two paranormal investigators accompany them in an attempt to determine if the location is haunted.

On April 10, 2013, Syfy renewed the series for a 12-episode second season which premiered September 4, 2013.

On December 19, 2013, Paranormal Investigator Patrick Doyle reported via his Facebook page that Syfy had decided not to renew the show for a third season.

== Premise ==
The series proposes that certain mines are haunted by ghosts of miners from Gold Rush days, or by spirits that superstitious miners call "Tommy-Knockers". Paranormal investigators Patrick and Kristen go into the mine first and investigate using equipment they believe can detect supernatural activity. Then it's Mine Foreman Stan's hard rock miner crew's turn to work the mine while the investigators monitor them on their DVR system in an attempt to see if they experience anything supernatural. In the end, the investigators show their evidence to the miners and state their opinions regarding the degree of supernatural activity they believe is present.

Opening introduction:

Let me tell you about gold. I've been chasing it my whole life. Everybody loves it. But it's got a dark side. The old miners that have died in there, they don't want you in their mine. Mines are some of the most haunted places in the world. I don't know what it really is, but it's there...and it scares the hell out of me!

== Cast and crew ==
Mine Owner:

- Larry Overman (owner of the Crescent Mine)

Hard Rock miners:

- Stan "Papa Smurf" Griffith - Mine Foreman (40 years mining experience/Griffith Exploration Corp.)
- Edward "Fast Eddie" Griffith - Job Supervisor (Stan's son)
- Keith "Dingus" Leingang - Drill Operator
- Jared "Buckett" Anderson - Heavy Machinery Operator
- Dick "Greybeard" Secord - Sample Specialist
- Richard "Duck" Secord - Explosives Expert (Season 1 - Episode 1, Season 2)
- Jay Verburg & Jamol Eli ("The Greenhorns") - Handymen (Jay was a former computer programmer)
- Mikey Griffith - Miner

Paranormal investigators:

- Patrick Doyle - Paranormal investigator (15 years experience)
- Kristen Luman - Investigator (background in paranormal psychology and 10 years experience)

== Episodes ==
=== Season 1 (2013) ===
No.	Title	Location(s)	Original release date
1.1	"Descent into Darkness"	Old Crescent Mine, Sumpter, Oregon	January 16, 2013
In the series premiere, the gold miners and paranormal team head to an abandoned mine along the Elkhorn Mountains in the community of Sumpter. The mine, said to be haunted, was recently reopened by new mine owner Larry Overman. According to Overman, his last crew walked off the job due to the hauntings and their own personal paranormal experiences.
1.2	"Disturbance at the Inn"	Sumpter Bed & Breakfast	January 23, 2013
After a cave-in and one miner's quitting (Duck), the team continues mining for gold. Paranormal investigators Patrick and Kristen use a robotic probe called the "R.I.P.A. 2" ("Remote Investigator of Paranormal Activity") and make a discovery in the eastern tunnel. Through research on the town, they discover that the bed and breakfast they later investigate used to be a hospital that treated injured miners and a masonic temple. This leads them to believe that the whole town, and not just the Crescent Mine, is haunted.
1.3	"Vengeful Spirit"	Sumpter Dredge	January 30, 2013
After weeks of working in the mine, the miners finally strike gold; however, power failures occur. Meanwhile, Kristen turns to a local Native American historian for help as she tries to figure out what's going on with the paranormal activity that she avers is being picked up in town. The historian says that "the dredge," an old gold mill built on a riverboat in 1935, had disfigured the land with its 8-mile long hole and scared off all the wildlife. When she and Patrick investigate the dredge, they record what they believe to be a full-bodied apparition of a miner named "Joe."
1.4	"Phantom Wind"	Sumpter Cemetery	February 6, 2013
While working 16-hour days in the mine, two miners claim to have experienced something that frightens them and seems to be paranormal. After hearing their story, Patrick and Kristen encounter what they term a "phantom wind" that they believe lends proof to the miners' claim. Through research, Patrick learns that on August 13, 1917, a fire broke out in the cook's quarters of the Capital Hotel, and the entire town burned down. So he heads to the local cemetery to see who perished in the blaze and perhaps identify the voice they claim to have captured on their audio recorder, whom they call "Joe."
1.5	"Secret Passage"	Sumpter Forest/Old Crescent Mine	February 13, 2013
Patrick and Kristen say they find clues of the mine's connection to the secret society of the Free Masons; they believe there is a secret passage to another tunnel and set out to find it. They say "a mysterious presence" has sent "a threatening message" by disrupting the mine. During a campfire, Dingus' 9-year-old daughter goes missing after reporting a shadowy figure peeking through the trees. Stan tracks down a new mine shaft and quickly has his crew excavate it.
1.6	"Gold Fever"	Unnamed Mine Shaft	February 20, 2013
Despite finding large amounts of gold in the Crescent Mine, the miners vote to begin work in the recently discovered mine shaft. However, they are cautioned by Patrick and Kristen, who both believe an evil presence is lurking inside the old tunnel. Their feelings are backed up when they claims to capture a full-figured apparition at the face of the shaft who they think may be guarding the mine. With the mining season coming to an end, the miners start blasting the new mine. They quickly get freaked out when claims of paranormal activity arise, but they still go for the gold.

=== Season 2 (2013) ===
No.	Title	Location(s)	Original release date	U.S. viewers (millions)
2.0	"Back on the Mountain"	Sumpter Dredge, Sumpter, Oregon	September 4, 2013	0.84
Adam Copeland hosts a special episode that briefly explores the history of the area and of the Old Crescent Mine. It then reviews the events of the previous season, offering new unseen footage from the first season. Then Adam, along with the miners, and the mine owner discuss events around the campfire. As well as offering their own perspective on the mine and their reasons for returning, the miners then answer fan questions put to them. During the interview, they are joined by paranormal investigators Patrick Doyle and Kristen Luman who, after explaining their reasons for taking on a paranormal investigation at the mine, join the discussion. After showing one of the five scariest moments on the show, the Tommyknocker incident that prompted Richard "Duck" Secord to quit the mine, he joins the discussion and explains his reasons for quitting the mine. As Copeland continues to discuss mining and the mine with the miners and Patrick and Kristen, footage is shown at random points, including footage showing the new Ripa 3 investigative robot that is used during the second season. They then are joined by some of the family members of the miners who join the discussion and give their thoughts on the questions put to them including those about being a wife of a miner. During the discussion, supported by footage from the first season, Copeland and the miners, as well as Patrick and Kristen, discuss the area, the mine and events that occurred previously in detail and give their thoughts on it. And also more 'Scariest' moments voted by the viewers are revealed. Drawing the discussion to a close, footage from the upcoming season is shown. Patrick, Kristen and the miners give their thoughts on the video clips and reveal their scariest moments on the show.
2.1	"Return to Darkness"	Old Crescent Mine, Sumpter, Oregon	September 4, 2013	0.93
The miners return to the Crescent Mine and are reunited with Patrick and Kristen, and Richard "Duck" Secord rejoins the team. Meanwhile, as the miners settle into their camp, they then discover that the previously unknown mine discovered during Season 1 had caved in due to an unknown person attempting to dig it out. They then devise a plan to tunnel from the Old Crescent Mine into the Old Unknown Mine to get to the gold. When work begins to excavate the mine, Kristen warns the miners of what might be released as a result of the blasting process. They then discover an unknown room in the mine which they dub 'The Ballroom' and explain that the area had previously been excavated. While searching the area, they find some out-of-place items. Because of this, Patrick and Kristen decide to investigate 'The Ballroom' and discover what they believe to be an entity in the area. Believing he may have seen an intruder in the area, Larry, along with Patrick and Stan, search the area but discover nothing. Patrick, after believing he was being watched, takes several pictures with his full-spectrum camera. While reviewing the pictures, Patrick discovers what he perceives as an anomaly in one and shows his findings to Kristen, who suspects it might be the previously encountered entity "Joe". Patrick and Kristen then decide to do a night time investigation in the woods and use a 100-year-old pickaxe as a trigger object to make contact with what they believe to be an entity in the area. They later present the previously discovered evidence to the miners. While reviewing the pictures taken in the 'Ballroom', Patrick and Kristen discover something they believe to be unknown on the mine wall.
2.2	"The Lost Chamber"	Old Crescent Mine, Sumpter, Oregon	September 11, 2013	1.38
Patrick and Kristen head into the 'Ballroom' chamber to investigate the wall of the mine after discovering something strange. While using black light on the wall, they discover what appears to be the Roman numeral 'VI' marked on the wall. Meanwhile, Mikey Griffith joins the team. Though the miners initially suspect Mikey is a greenhorn, Stan reveals that he is highly experienced. Meanwhile, the miners begin work in two teams: one team mines the western tunnel, and Mikey and Bucket clear the debris in the 'Ballroom' chamber. After checking in with Stan, Jay thinks he spots someone walking past him into the mine as he checked the board. Jay initially suspects it to be Mikey. Believing it may be a trespasser, several of the miners go back inside to investigate and find it to be all clear. Stan decides to go to Patrick and Kristen to see if they have footage of what Jay may have seen but discover a strange glitch occurring on multiple cameras. They decide to go inside to investigate the 'Ballroom' at nightfall. As Patrick and Kristen begin checking the cameras, they hear sounds and see a light from within the mine. Patrick and Kristen decide to travel to the Baker County Library to investigate the 'Ballroom' and the 'VI' symbol by checking newspaper and book records. Kristen discovers a possible history of the room, called the Chamber of Reflection, and proposes a link between the room and the Free Masons. On the way back to the mine, Patrick and Kristen discuss the newly discovered evidence, and Stan discovers that Mikey and Bucket have not 'Brassed out'. Finding this unusual, he heads to the ballroom out of concern. Stan informs Mikey and Bucket that they have been there for 6 hours to their surprise; they believe they were only there for an hour. Mikey decides to discuss his potential 'lost time' experience with Patrick and Kristen, and he later discusses it with the rest of the miners. After hearing Mikey's story, Patrick and Kristen head into the ballroom to search for a potential answer to Mikey's experience. Patrick and Kristen conduct a time code experiment with two cameras. After discovering that his compass is reacting strangely, Patrick and Kristen suspect that there may be a high magnetic field in the 'Ballroom' and believe the effects of this may have caused Mikey and Bucket's perceived 'time loss'. Patrick and Kristen later show the recorded evidence of their 'Ballroom' investigation to the miners, including the 'knocking' experiment and what they believe is a response. Patrick and Kristen also reveal what they found about the possible history of the room. As the miners begin prepping for the blasting process in the ballroom, Kristen gives her thoughts on what may be released. As Mikey and Bucket leave the mine, and with the explosive charge now lit, they wait with the other miners for the explosion, only to discover it does not occur.
2.3	"Phantom Intruder"	Old Crescent Mine, Sumpter, Oregon	September 18, 2013	0.96
The miners wait outside of the mine for the impending explosion, only to discover it may have misfired. At Stan's request, Patrick sends Ripa 3 into the mine to investigate the area and find out what may have gone wrong. As they examine the area with Ripa 3, they inadvertently reignite the explosives, severely damaging Ripa 3 in the process. The miners then head back into the mine to investigate what may have caused the fuse to reignite and discover a newly opened section of the ballroom which is caved-in. Believing it to be man-made, Patrick and Kristen decide to investigate the area and conduct an EVP session, but are forced to leave the area for safety reasons after hearing and seeing what they believed to be rocks falling. When they explain their experience to Stan and Eddie, they both head into the Ballroom and find nothing out of place. They then return with Patrick and Kristen and explain their findings, and Patrick speculates that they may have experienced a residual haunting of a past event. At Larry's request, Patrick and Kristen examine what Larry believes to be a malfunctioning trail camera that has a full memory card. After reviewing the pictures on the memory card, they discover an anomaly present on most of the pictures. Because of this, Patrick and Kristen return to the area at night to investigate and, after hearing unknown sounds, discover a rock formation, with one rock having Chinese symbols on it. After concluding the investigation, Patrick and Kristen discuss their findings with the miners, with Stan believing it may have been from the Chinese miners who were known to mine in the area in the past. The next day, the miners discover that some of their equipment had been moved and vandalized by who they believed to be a trespasser. They then continue work on the 'dog leg' tunnel. Meanwhile, Patrick investigates further into the Chinese symbols they had discovered, and Kristen travels to the Sumpter Museum to investigate the Chinese miners who lived in the area. She learns that there may have been 2000–3000 miners who lived in the area that were not counted on the census, and that they did all kinds of labor but were treated poorly by the locals. Patrick and Kristen then gather the miners in the Cook Shack to present the evidence they had gathered and to hear their thoughts on what they had discovered. Some of the evidence revealed included a translation of the Chinese symbols discovered which were revealed to be 'House of Cremation' and a translation of an EVP captured which they believed to say 'I'm lost' in Cantonese. During the evidence reveal, a loud bang against the structure is heard but no cause is found. And as the miners and Patrick and Kristen search the area, the miners believed it may have been a trespasser, but Patrick speculates it may be something else.
2.4	"Wandering Spirits"	Baker City, Baker County, Oregon	September 25, 2013	1.11
Following the events at the Cook Shack, Patrick and Kristen decide to investigate the area at nightfall and conduct an experiment to try to debunk what they had experienced with the miners prior. With no success, they then conduct an EVP session and find nothing. Patrick and Kristen then decide to travel to Baker City in an attempt to try to find a connection between the Chinese miners and the Crescent Mine. They then meet up with author Greg Nokes at the Geiser Grand Hotel and discover that due to a lack of jobs in the area, the locals turned on the Chinese miners and placed blame on them. Although they were treated poorly with many incidents of racial violence, they learn of a massacre that occurred at Hells Canyon, where many Chinese miners were found dead, and that the event was covered up for more than a century. After learning that the Chinese were not allowed to be buried along with the Caucasian locals in area, they discover that they have a cemetery in the Baker City area and decide to investigate. They discover a burn house, and many depressions in the ground where the bones of the Chinese miners were dug up to be reburied in China. After finding a lone gravestone of a man who had died in the 1930s, they conduct an EVP session, believing his spirit may be wandering the area. While Patrick and Greybeard look over the remains of Ripa 3, Kristen travels to Granite, Oregon to investigate further into the Chinese miners and their connection to the Crescent Mine. Upon arriving at the Chinese Walls, an area where the Chinese miners once lived, she discovers a 60-acre area of rocks that were once sorted through by the Chinese miners, and then decides to take pictures using a full spectrum camera and hears the sound of rocks falling. Meanwhile following the news that the gold vein they had been mining had run dry, the miners focus on finding a new vein of gold and place importance on the dog leg tunnel in the Eastern tunnel. Stan decides to allow the miners to see their families in an effort to boost morale. During the event, Mikey and Jay decide to have a Jack Leg contest in front of their families and the miners, along with Patrick, with Mikey the victor of the contest. After successfully creating a dog leg tunnel around the cave-in in the ballroom, the miners along with Patrick investigate the area but are confused when they find that the newly discovered tunnel goes nowhere. Eddie discovers a rich vein of quartz, while Patrick and Stan suspect that the area may have been caved in to prevent access to the area. Patrick and Kristen then decide to return to the Chinese Walls to investigate the area and conduct an EVP session. While investigating the area, Patrick's camera dies.
2.5	"Ghosts of the Geiser Grand"	Geiser Grand Hotel, Baker City	October 2, 2013	0.94
Kristen decides to investigate the Geiser Grand Hotel in Baker City and discovers that it may be haunted, and that it may have a connection to the Crescent Mine. She then decides to return to the hotel with Patrick and learns that the Geiser family were a wealthy family that owned their own mine and that they may have hired Chinese miners. When they investigate further they learn that the hotel was constructed in 1889 at the height of the gold rush, and hear about how the Chinese workers were said to have constructed tunnels that were linked to the China town district as they were allegedly not allowed on the streets. They both then conduct an investigation at the hotel, and later an EVP session in an attempt to make contact with Albert Geiser. With the investigation over, they return to the Crescent Mine and gather the miners at the cook shack to present their evidence. Kristen explains about the Chinese walls, and of the persecution the Chinese miners are believed to have faced. They then give their thoughts about how they believe the Geiser Grand Hotel and the Crescent Mine are linked. They then conclude the evidence reveal by telling the miners that they had discovered a burn house on the outskirts of Baker City by a Chinese cemetery and believe that Chinese miners may be buried in the area.
2.6	"Mystery Train"	Sumpter Valley Railway. McEwen, Oregon	October 9, 2013	0.86
Patrick and Kristen continue their night time investigation in the woods and attempt to replicate the anomaly caught on the camera but are unsuccessful. Believing that there may be spirits in the area they then conduct an EVP session before concluding the investigation. Meanwhile the miners sat around the campfire and discussed the recent events, before Stan reveals that the security guard they had hired had quit due to unknown circumstances. Patrick and Kristen then travel to the Sumpter Train Depot after hearing what they believe to be a train steam whistle on an EVP from their previous investigation. After hearing that the train was not operational during their investigation, they then learn about the history of the railway and how it was linked the Crescent Mine, and that miners injured or killed at the mine were transported to Baker City. Patrick and Kristen decide to ride the train to McEwen, Oregon to investigate further. At nightfall Patrick and Kristen decide to investigate the McEwen train yard, and after hearing what they believe to be footsteps, Patrick then captures what he believes to be a figure on his camera in a nearby train car but upon searching the car, discover nothing. They then decide to do an EVP session to make contact with what they may of seen. On their journey back to Sumpter, Patrick and Kristen decide to investigate the train and use their full spectrum camera, and also conduct an EVP session in an attempt to contact who they believe may be spirits of miners. During their investigation several instances of the train car door opening were seen but not explained. Back at the mine, the miners continue their raising up process and while Jamol decides to grow a herb garden, inside the mine Mikey believes he may of heard and felt something strange. When Patrick and Kristen decide to look further into what they had discovered and how it is all linked, they then travel to the Sumpter B&B where Jay's son Ashton informs them that he may of caught something unexplained on camera, which he believes to be a shadow figure. After reviewing Ashton's evidence, Patrick and Kristen are led to the Elkhorn Saloon by Ashton to investigate where he caught the footage, where they learn the history of the place from the owners, and claims that it might be haunted. Patrick and Kristen then return to the saloon at nightfall and conduct an investigation to uncover answers. During an EVP session they hear several unexplained sounds but find no explanation. Patrick then uncovers an anomalous heat signature on his camera but finds no explanation. Patrick and Kristen then meet the miners and their families in Sumpter to present their evidence and to hear their thoughts. Patrick explains about the figure the security guard was chasing, and talks, along with Kristen about their findings in the woods, that of an EVP that sounds to them like a steam train whistle. They then talk about the railway and its link to the Crescent Mine. After revealing their findings at the McEwen train yard, they then reveal their evidence found at the Elkhorn Saloon. Patrick and Kristen then talk about how they believe that all their experiences are somehow linked to the Crescent Mine. The next day, the miners notice a forest fire in the distance.
2.7	"Massacre at Hells Canyon"	Hells Canyon	October 16, 2013	0.89
The miners decide to evacuate the Crescent Mine and journey to Sumpter to meet their families. Though concerned that the forest fire may cause the closure of the mine, and their chance to make money. As they settle in and await further news, Patrick and Kristen approach Stan to inform him that they will be traveling to Hells Canyon to investigate further into the Chinese miners that were reported to be massacred by horse thieves. The following day Stan informs the miners that the fire had been contained and that it was safe to return to work, and then mentions that prior to leaving Patrick and Kristen wanted them to wait until they returned before resuming work. Meanwhile Patrick and Kristen arrive at Hells Canyon and journey by boat along Snake River and learn more about the massacre and that a monument was placed in the area that contained the names of the Chinese miners who were pulled from the river. Meanwhile back at the mine Jay and Bucket investigate a generator failure, and inside the mine, while sampling, Duck and Greybeard hear what they believe to be knocking, and decide to leave the mine through concern. Patrick and Kristen then arrive near the presumed burial site of the Chinese miners and set up camp. At nightfall Patrick and Kristen decide to investigate the area and after initially receiving some startling results on their initial EMF sweep, decide to set up a laser grid near the camp and conduct an EVP session in both English and Cantonese. During the EVP session Patrick and Kristen both believe to hear the sound of movement in the area, but find no explanation. Kristen then decides to take pictures using her full spectrum camera while Patrick searches the area. Back at the mine the miners continue to be plagued by equipment malfunctions, and while alone in the mine, Jamol believes he may of heard something he can't explain. After hearing what he believes to be a chinese miner attempting to make contact, Patrick and Kristen then resume their investigation on a nearby ridge after both believing they had seen a shadow figure. Patrick then decides to conduct an EVP session while Kristen takes pictures with a full spectrum camera. Back at the mine the miners continue the raising up process and successful set and detonate the explosives. After finding no explanation for what they had seen and heard during the investigation, Patrick and Kristen decide to conclude the investigation and return to their campsite to rest. Not long after they are awoken when the motion detectors set previously inexplicably activate. Patrick, concerned by this searches the surrounding area but finds no answers, but later feels unwell. Back at the mine, while clearing the debris from the explosion, Jamol experiences an equipment malfunction with his mucker and a fire starts in the mine.
2.8	"Supercharging the Supernatural"	Old Crescent Mine, Sumpter, Oregon, Hell's Canyon along the Snake River, McEwen, Oregon	October 23, 2013	0.85
The miners continue to experience equipment malfunctions and take measures when a mucker unexplainably catches fire. Meanwhile Patrick and Kristen wrap up their investigation at Hells Canyon. After earlier hearing about the miners strange experiences at the mine, Patrick and Kristen decide to conduct an experiment with a Tesla Coil which they believe will make it easier for them to capture evidence of any paranormal activity in the mine. During the experiment Patrick and Kristen investigate the mine and hear, and see what they believe to be paranormal activity. Following the conclusion of the experiment and after reviewing the evidence, Patrick and Kristen present their evidence to the miners and show them their findings, and what they believe to be a shadow figure. The next day Kristen decides to meet the mayor of Sumpter and learns about the alleged murder of eighteen chinese miners who were killed in the town of McEwen in a fire. After hearing the story Patrick and Kristen later decide to investigate several sites in McEwen and conduct an EVP session in both English and Cantonese to contact any presumed spirits in the area. The following day, Patrick agrees to send RIPA into the newly discovered drift at the request of the miners, but RIPA experiences technical malfunctions not long after which halts the investigation.
2.9	"Town-wide Terror"	The Dredge, Old Crescent Mine, Sumpter, Oregon, Baker City, Sumpter Valley Railway	October 30, 2013	1.17
The miners attempt to use RIPA to explore a newly discovered drift but their plans are derailed when an unexplained technical malfunction causes problems in the mine. When Patrick investigates the cause, he discovers that several components require replacing before it will be operational again. Kristen meanwhile believes that the presumed spirits of the Chinese miners in the area are traveling in straight lines across Sumpter and that they somehow are linked to the Crescent Mine. Patrick and Kristen then decide to conduct an overnight investigation at several locations in Sumpter and set up cameras across the town. During their investigation they are contacted by Ashton, who they invited to join the investigation who is also the son of Jay, a miner. He informs Patrick and Kristen that he believes to have seen a shadow figure while viewing the video feed on one of the monitors in the area. When unexplained visual anomalys appear on several of the monitors, Patrick and Kristen follow what they believe to be a spirit across Sumpter which they later discovered may have gone into the mine. The next day Kristen and Stan travel to the Octave Mine in Congress, Arizona where they learn about the history of the mine and of the local legend of the Blue Devil of Octave from Adam, the mines owner. Adam, along with Kristen and Stan then decide to head into the mine, and Stan notes from visually inspecting the area that it seemed promising but required substantial rehab work. During the mine investigation Kristen and Stan discover strange markings on the mine wall and hear unexplained sounds, and at numerous points during the investigation Kristen notes the high EMF readings. With RIPA now operational, the miners, along with Patrick use it to explore the upper drift and discover a promising quartz vein and another bulkhead.
2.10	"Passageway to the Unknown"	Old Crescent Mine, Sumpter, Oregon, Oracle Mine, Cemetery outside The Oracle	November 6, 2013	0.99
Kristen and Stan decide to travel to the Octave Mine in Arizona and hear about the history of the mine and local legends from the mines owner. They then decide to investigate the mine and experience what they believe to be paranormal activity, and discover markings on the mine wall of what they believe to be a demon and cross markings. With the investigation now over, they leave the mine and Stan believes the mine to be promising prospect. Meanwhile, at the Crescent Mine Patrick and the miners decide to investigate the newly discovered bulkhead with RIPA, and learn about the Quartz vibrations in the mine. They discover an area of interest and decide to blast the area but inadvertently create a new opening in the side of the mountain.
2.11	"Shadows in the Drift"	Old Crescent Mine, Sumpter, Oregon	November 13, 2013	1.07
When the miners inadvertently blast a hole in the side of the mountain while in pursuit of the quartz vein previously discovered, they then take measures to secure the area, and one miner discovers evidence of another drift below. With the miners and Patrick and Kristen gathered, Patrick suggests that he will rappel down the side of the mountain to see what is there. At nightfall Patrick and Kristen investigate the drift and experience when they believe to be paranormal activity and notice that the new opening of the mine is facing Baker City and come to the conclusion that they believe any presumed spirits in the area are traveling in a straight line. The next day Patrick rappels down the side of the mountain and into the newly discovered entrance and encounters another bulkhead with a masonic symbol engraved on it. After briefly investigating the area, he returns to the group. When Stan and Eddie discover that they had gone in the wrong direction in the upper drift, they decide to investigate in the opposite direction with Patrick and Kristen and initially experience equipment malfunctions. When they reach the end of the tunnel they notice that it had been caved in, and they then hear unexplained sounds. Stan and Eddie then lay out in detail their plans to Larry the miner owner about reaching what they believe to be the motherload of gold, and Patrick and Kristen meanwhile review the evidence gathered over a 24-hour period, and discuss the significance of the bulkheads and believe that there may have been one outside of the Crescent Mine itself. After learning that the miners have actively taken measures to remove the debris from the caved in section of the upper drift, Patrick and Kristen present Stan with what they believe to be audio and visual evidence of a shadow figure, and later inform him that the audio evidence was translated from Chinese as 'Demon'. They then warn of him that there may be an entity in the area, to which Stan responds that they have no choice but to continue working on the drift. Meanwhile while clearing the debris from the caved in section of the upper drift, Jay believes that he had been tapped on the shoulder. Patrick and Kristen then decide to ask Larry if there may have been a bulkhead at the portal of the Crescent Mine and learn that while he didn't personally see one, when the mine was opened by him that they had discovered a lot of wood near the entrance. They then decide to search through the stored wood and discover a piece with a masonic symbol engraved on it and believe it to be from a potential portal bulkhead.
2.12	"The Final Barrier"	Old Crescent Mine, Sumpter, Oregon	November 20, 2013	1.03
Patrick and Kristen along with Stan and Eddie investigate a stone bulkhead which they discover has 3 lots of triangles and believe it to be a Masonic symbol. The miners are faced with a decision when Patrick and Kristen reveal the evidence taken during an investigation which includes what they believe to be a growling noise, they believe what is behind the bulkhead shouldn't be released, and that it may be unsafe for the miners. The miners vote on the issue in the cook shack and decide that the gold is more important and return to the bulkhead to begin work. They are soon joined by Patrick and Kristen, and watch on as Buckett works on the bulkhead, however they hear what appears to be a structural sound and evacuate the mine as it collapses. While outside the miners watch on as the mine collapses and the portal is sealed. The miners reluctantly decide to pack up and leave as the season is coming to an end, but before they do they decide to, along with Patrick and Kristen lay a monument in honor of the miners who may be at the site.

== Current status ==
As of 2013, the Crescent mine has been listed for sale with Cascade Sotheby's realty for an assessed value of $2.5 million. Larry Overman the mine owner finally placed a monument which had been planned for years, the stone was the corner stone to the original miners lodge that used to stand on the property to keep the spirit "at peace".

== Syndication ==
In October 2016, Ghost Mine premiered on Destination America.

== See also ==
- Apparitional experience
