= Hereford, Oregon =

Unincorporated community in the state of Oregon, United States

- Unincorporated community
- Location within Oregon Location within the United States
- Coordinates: 44°29′55″N 118°02′14″W
- Country: United States
- State: Oregon
- County: Baker
- Elevation: 3,671 ft (1,119 m)
- Time zone: UTC-8 (Pacific (PST))
  - Summer (DST): UTC-7 (PDT)
- Area codes: 458 and 541
- GNIS feature ID: 1136373

Hereford is an unincorporated community in Baker County, in the U.S. state of Oregon. Hereford lies along the Burnt River southwest of Baker. It is on Oregon Route 245 northeast of its intersection with U.S. Route 26 in Unity. Hereford is 3,671 feet (1,119 m) above sea level.

Hereford once had a post office, but the area continues to use a ZIP code 97837. It is said that the community was named in the late 19th century for a Hereford bull. A post office was established here on March 7, 1887.
