= McEwen, Oregon =

Unincorporated community in the state of Oregon, United States

- Unincorporated community
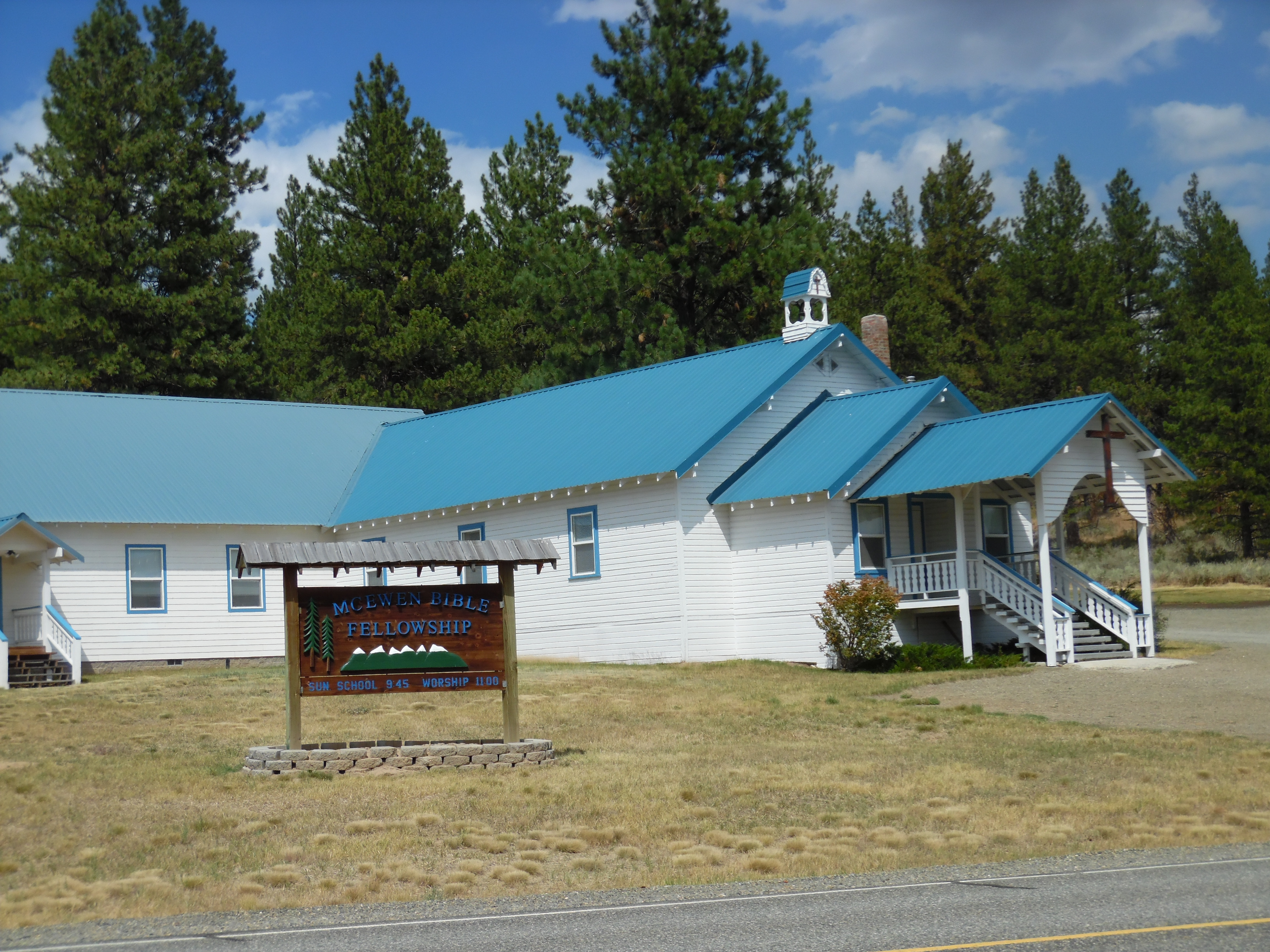
- Community church in McEwen

- Location within Oregon Location within the United States
- Coordinates: 44°42′03″N 118°06′17″W
- Country: United States
- State: Oregon
- County: Baker
- Elevation: 4,150 ft (1,260 m)
- Time zone: UTC-8 (Pacific (PST))
  - Summer (DST): UTC-7 (PDT)
- Area codes: 458 and 541
- GNIS feature ID: 1136524

McEwen is an unincorporated community in Baker County, Oregon, United States. McEwen lies on Oregon Route 7 east of its interchange with Oregon Route 410. McEwen is about 6 miles (10 km) southeast of Sumpter along the Powder River.

McEwen was founded as a logging town, platted in 1891, and then was a rail stop on the Sumpter Valley Railway. It was named after a Mormon missionary who converted Charles W. Nibley's parents to the LDS Church.

Oregon Geographic Names links the community name to Thomas McEwen, a settler who filed a land claim here in 1888. The McEwen post office opened in 1893 and closed in 1943.
