= Galena, Oregon =

Coordinates: 44.710434°N 118.816348°W

Galena is an unincorporated community in Grant County, Oregon, United States, about 20 miles (32 km) from Austin Junction in the Blue Mountains. It is on the Middle Fork John Day River in the Malheur national forest. The former gold mining camp is considered a ghost town.

The locale was settled in 1865 as a mining community on the Middle Fork John Day River near its confluence with Elk Creek. The town was named Susanville after one of the earliest inhabitants, Susan Ward.

Galena post office was established in 1901 when a group of miners were able to get the Susanville post office moved from the current site of Galena two miles up Elk Creek to their mine. The new post office was named for a body of galena ore in the area, and the town was renamed as well. The mines were worked extensively in the 1860s and were still active in 1940.

== See also ==
- List of ghost towns in Oregon
