= Antlers Guard Station =

- U.S. National Register of Historic Places
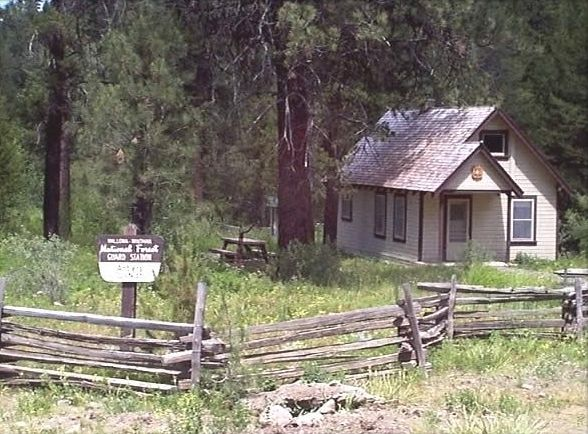
- Location: Wallowa–Whitman National Forest
- Nearest city: Baker City, Oregon
- Coordinates: 44°38′01″N 118°16′44″W
- Built: 1935
- Architectural style: Rustic forest cabin
- NRHP reference No.: 91000166
- Added to NRHP: 1991

The Antlers Guard Station is a rustic cabin located in the Wallowa–Whitman National Forest in northeastern Oregon, United States. It was originally built to house fire crews assigned to patrol the surrounding National Forest. Since the 1990s, the United States Forest Service rents Antlers Guard Station and other forest cabins and lookout stations to recreational visitors. The Antlers Guard Station is listed on the National Register of Historic Places.

== History ==
In the 1920s and 1930s, Forest Service employees often traveled many miles from local ranger stations to forest work sites. Since the forest road networks were not well developed, getting to a job site meant a long trek, carrying all the equipment needed to perform the field work. This made it impractical for employees to make daily round trips. To facilitate work at remote sites, the Forest Service built guard stations at strategic locations throughout the forest to house fire patrols and project crews.

After World War II, the Forest Service greatly expanded its road network, allowing employees to get to most National Forest areas within a few hours. As a result, guard stations lost their utility. The Forest Service found new uses for some stations, but most were demolished or abandoned.

In the 1990s, historic preservation groups, with the support of Forest Service employees, began pressing National Forest managers to preserve the remaining structures. To finance the preservation effort, the Forest Service started renting its guard stations to the public. It later began renting out many unused fire lookout towers as well.

The Antlers Guard Station was built by the Civilian Conservation Corps in 1935. It was originally used as a home station for fire crews patrolling the surrounding forest. The Wallowa–Whitman National Forest started renting cabins including Antlers Guard Station to the public in the early 1990s. Because of its rustic architecture and the cabin's unique historic value as an early Forest Service guard station, it was listed on the National Register of Historic Places in 1991.

== Structure ==
The Antlers Guard Station is located at an elevation of 4,107 feet (1,252 m) on the west bank of the North Fork of the Burnt River approximately two miles from the abandoned Whitney, Oregon town site. The forest area around the cabin is dominated by ponderosa pine and provides scenic views.

The Antlers Guard Station has wood frame construction and a concrete foundation. Its exterior is covered with weather board and shingles. It has two small rooms: the front room is a combined living room and bedroom. It is furnished with a futon style double bed and two bunk bed sets. The kitchen is equipped with a propane stove, table and chairs. The cabin has a propane fireplace for heat and propane lights.

An outhouse is located near the cabin. Water is available from an outside hand pump. There is a garage, a fire pit, and an outdoor picnic table located on the guard station grounds. There is also room for tent camping at the site.

== Recreation ==
The Antlers Guard Station can be rented by the night. The Wallowa–Whitman National Forest keeps 95 percent of the rental fee to maintain the cabin and improve the site. The cabin is available year-round and can be booked for up to seven days at a time. Kitchen utensils are provided, but visitors must bring their own sleeping bags or bedding, toiletries, towel, and first aid kit.

In the summer, visitors can hike trails or bike on forest roads. The cabin is also used by fishermen and hunters. Cross-country skiing, snowshoeing, and snowmobiling on designated routes are popular winter activities. In addition, it is legal to pan for gold in the Burnt River, which flows next to the guard station. Because the cabin is located in an isolated forest area, the Forest Service warns visitors to watch out for mountain lions, black bears, and rattle snakes.

== Access ==
Antlers Guard Station is located approximately two miles from the old Whitney town site. It is 22 miles northwest of Unity, Oregon, and 40 miles west of Baker City, Oregon. Cabin reservations and detailed directions to the site can be obtained from the Wallowa–Whitman National Forest. In the winter, snow in the area can get deep so the Forest Service recommends that visitors carry tire chains during the winter.
