= Whitney, Oregon =

Unincorporated community in the state of Oregon, United States

- Unincorporated community
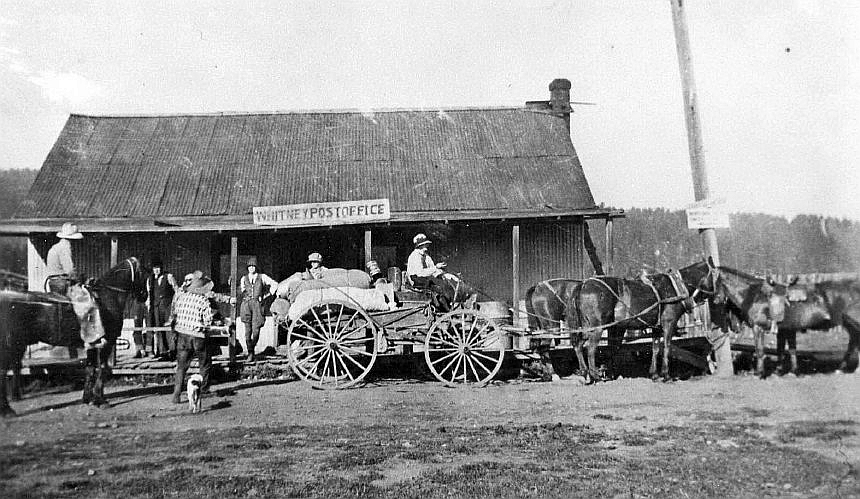
- Post office in Whitney, about 1900–1910

- Location within Oregon Location within the United States
- Coordinates: 44°39′34″N 118°17′27″W
- Country: United States
- State: Oregon
- County: Baker
- Elevation: 4,160 ft (1,270 m)
- Time zone: UTC-8 (Pacific (PST))
  - Summer (DST): UTC-7 (PDT)
- Area codes: 458 and 541
- GNIS feature ID: 1152282

Whitney is an unincorporated community, also considered a ghost town, in Baker County, Oregon, United States, on Oregon Route 7 southwest of Sumpter. It is on the North Fork Burnt River, near the Blue Mountains and Wallowa-Whitman National Forest.

Whitney was named for a pioneer in the county, C.H. Whitney. The community of Whitney had a post office from 1901 to 1943.

Founded as a logging town and platted in 1900, Whitney was the primary station on the narrow gauge Sumpter Valley Railway. The Oregon Lumber Company built the first sawmill. It burned down in 1918, causing the town to severely decline. It was rebuilt in 1939 by the Oregon Lumber Company to harvest some nearby newly purchased timber stands. The Nibley Lumber Company built a second sawmill in 1910–11 on the south side of town. It was a picturesque ruin well into the 21st century, but as of 2008 was completely gone. Logging declined in the area in the 1940s, which caused the town and the railroad to fade.

The Antlers Guard Station, which is on the National Register of Historic Places, is in the Whitney area.

== See also ==
- List of ghost towns in Oregon
