= Oregon Route 410 =

State highway in Baker County, Oregon, US

Oregon Route 410
- Route 410 highlighted in red

Route information
- Maintained by ODOT
- Length: 3.71 mi (5.97 km)
- Existed: 2003–present

Major junctions
- West end: Granite Hill Highway in Sumpter
- East end: OR 7 near Sumpter

Location
- Country: United States
- State: Oregon
- County: Baker

Highway system
- Oregon Highways; Interstate; US; State; Named; Scenic
← I-405	→ OR 413

Oregon Route 410 (OR 410) is an Oregon state highway running from Sumpter to OR 7 near Sumpter. OR 410 is known as the Sumpter Highway. It is 3.71 miles (5.97 km) long and runs east–west, entirely within Baker County. OR 410 was established in 2003 as part of Oregon's project to assign route numbers to highways that previously were not assigned, and, as of June 2020, was unsigned.

== Route description ==
OR 410 begins at the western city limits of Sumpter and heads east through Sumpter. It ends 1.83 miles (2.95 km) east of the eastern city limits at an intersection with OR 7.

== History ==
The Sumpter Highway originally ran to the current intersection of OR 7 and OR 245 in Salisbury and was designated as OR 220. This designation was removed in the 1980s when the section east of the current terminus was redesignated as part of the Whitney Highway and OR 7. OR 410 was assigned to the Sumpter Highway in 2003.

== Major intersections ==
The entire route is in Baker County.

Location	mi	km	Destinations	Notes
Sumpter	0.00	0.00	Granite Hill Highway	
	3.71	5.97	OR 7 – Baker City, John Day	
1.000 mi = 1.609 km; 1.000 km = 0.621 mi
