= Unity Ranger Station =

- U.S. National Register of Historic Places
- U.S. Historic district
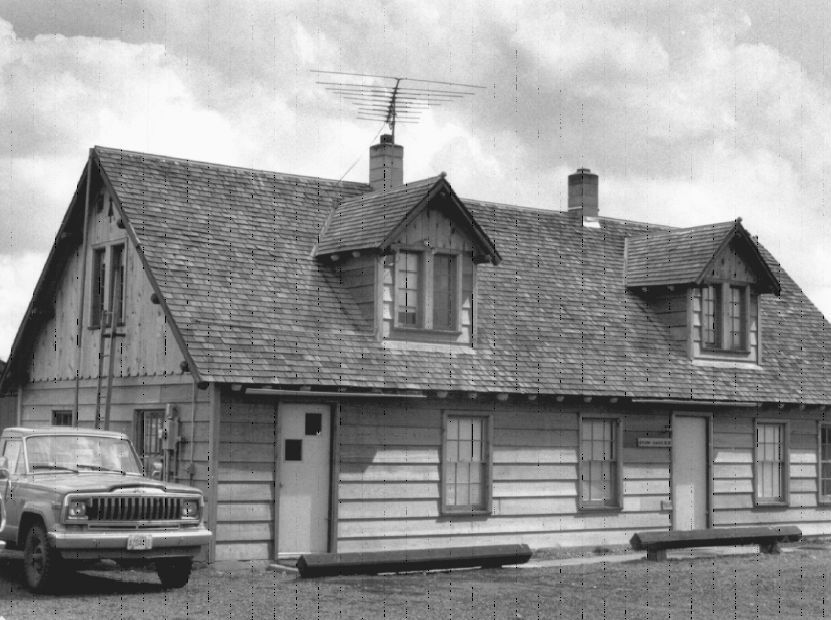
- Unity Ranger Station bunkhouse, 1984

- Location within Oregon Location within the United States
- Location: Wallowa-Whitman National Forest
- Nearest city: Unity, Oregon, USA
- Coordinates: 44.43544°N 118.1874°W
- Built: 1936–1938; 88 years ago
- Architect: U.S. Forest Service, Pacific Northwest Regional Architecture Group
- Architectural style: Cascadian rustic
- NRHP reference No.: 86000823
- Added to NRHP: 1986

The Unity Ranger Station is a United States Forest Service compound consisting of five buildings and a lookout tower in the Wallowa-Whitman National Forest of northeastern Oregon. It was previously the administrative headquarters for the Unity Ranger District. It is located in the small unincorporated community of Unity, Oregon. The historic structures were built in the rustic style by the Civilian Conservation Corps between 1936 and 1938. Today, the ranger station is only used during the summer months to house Forest Service fire crews. The ranger station is listed on the National Register of Historic Places.

== History ==
In the early 20th century, the forest road networks were not well developed. To facilitate work in National Forests, the Forest Service built district ranger stations at strategic locations within the forest to house full-time employees and provide logistics support to fire patrols and project crews working in remote areas of the forest. After World War II, the Forest Service greatly expanded its road network, allowing employees to get to most forest areas within a few hours. As a result, many of the more isolated ranger stations were closed or converted to summer guard stations.

The Whitman National Forest was established in 1908. The Unity Ranger District was an administrative subdivision of the Whitman National Forest, with responsibility for 194,000 acres (790 km^{2}) of forest land in the Blue Mountains of northeastern Oregon. After the Forest Service reorganization in 1954, the Unity Ranger District became part of the much larger Wallowa-Whitman National Forest.

The Civilian Conservation Corps began doing construction work at the ranger station in 1936. Between 1936 and 1938, Civilian Conservation Corps crews built a number of ranger station buildings. The construction crews worked under the supervision of Forest Service rangers. All of the buildings constructed during that period were designed by the Forest Service's Pacific Northwest Regional Architecture Group, and were built in the Cascadian rustic style.

In 1953, two buildings were moved to the ranger station from the John Day Experiment Station, a Forest Service research site on the Blue Mountains. This gave the ranger station a second ranger residence and a bunkhouse. Both of the buildings were constructed by the Civilian Conservation Corps under the supervision of Forest Service rangers at about the same time as the original ranger station structures. The two experiment station buildings have the same architectural characteristics as the original ranger station structures and were built using the same materials and methods.

The Unity Ranger Station served as a district headquarters until 2002, when the Unity district and two other ranger districts were merged and the headquarters was moved to Baker City, Oregon. However, a full-time visitor center remained open at the site until 2009. Today, the Unity Ranger Station is only open during the summer months, when the facilities are used to house Forest Service fire fighters.

There are six historically important structures that make up the ranger station complex. The historic buildings are all in excellent condition and are still used by Forest Service employees during the summer fire season. Because the Unity Ranger Station is of unique historic value as an early Forest Service ranger station, the compound was listed on the National Register of Historic Places on 11 April 1986. All of the historic buildings are located near one another so the historic district covers just 1-acre (4,000 m^{2}).

== Structures ==
With six historic structures, the Unity Ranger Station is a classic Forest Service range station. All of the historic buildings were built by the Civilian Conservation Corps between 1936 and 1938. Their work included two ranger residences, a bunkhouse, an equipment warehouse, a garage, and a fire lookout tower. The buildings were constructed in the Cascadian rustic architectural style using a wood-frame structure on a concrete foundation with clapboard, wood shingles, native lava stone, and concrete as the principal building materials. Many of the gables and shutters have the "open pine tree" logo common to Forest Service structures built during the 1930s.

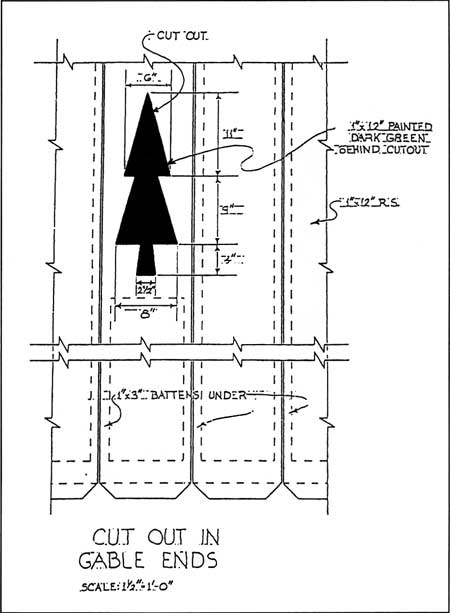
Forest Service open pine tree logo design

- The first ranger residence (building #1051) was built at the ranger station by the Civilian Conservation Corps. It is an L-shaped, one-story wood-frame building on a concrete foundation. It has a gabled roof with a hip extension on the east end. There are decorative pine tree logo cut outs on the north and west gable ends. The building's exterior is covered with clapboard except the gable ends which have vertical board and batten siding. There is a red lava stone chimney on the west side of the building. The roof extends out past the walls to cover porches on the north and east sides of the building. The porch roofs are supported by square timber posts. The residence has a combination of six-over-six double-hung sash windows and four-over-four double-hung sash windows. There have been no significant alterations to the exterior structure of the building.
- Near residence #1051, there is a small rectangular residential garage. It is a one-story wood-frame building on a poured concrete foundation. It has a gabled roof covered with wood shingles. The garage has horizontal lapped siding with vertical board and batten at the gable ends. An overhead-lift type vehicle-entry door is located on the west side of the building. There is also a regular entry door on the north. The garage's exterior siding was replaced in 1983 using the same kind of material as the original.
- The Unity Ranger Station equipment warehouse is a wood-frame structure, built at the site by the Civilian Conservation Corps. The foundation is concrete with a stone veneer. It has a wood-shingled gabled roof with a large projecting gable that gives the building an L-shape. There is a vehicle entrance below the projecting gable. There is a red lava stone chimney off-center on the south roof slope. The main roof extends out on the north side of the building to cover the porch. The porch roof is supported by square timber posts. The exterior siding is horizontal clapboard with vertical board and batten siding at the gable ends. Windows are the single-sash type. There is a decorative pine tree logo cut out just below the peak on the projecting gable.
- A second residence (building #1052) was built by the Civilian Conservation Corps at the John Day Experiment Station sometime between 1936 and 1938. It was moved to the ranger station in 1953. It is an L-shaped, 1 1/2-story wood-frame structure on a concrete foundation. It has a high gabled roof with larger gabled dormers on the south side (rear) of the structure. There is a large offset gable on the northeast corner and shed-type roof over the front porch which is located on the north side of the building. The porch roof is supported by round peeled-log posts. There is a brick chimney on the south side of the house and a concrete chimney on the north side. The exterior siding is horizontal clapboard with wooden corner trim and vertical board and batten siding at the gable ends. The residence has six-over-six double-hung sash windows. There are decorative pine tree logo cut outs just below the peak on the north, east, and west gable ends of the building.
- Like residence #1052, the bunkhouse was originally constructed at the John Day Experiment Station in the mid-1930s, and moved to the ranger station in 1953. The bunkhouse is a 1 1/2-story, rectangular building. It has a wood-frame, concrete foundation, and a high gabled roof with wooden-shingles. It has two large gable dormers on the front roof slope. There are also two cement chimneys that straddle the roof ridge. The exterior siding is horizontal clapboard with vertical board and batten siding at the gable ends. The bunkhouse has six-over-six double-hung sash windows. There are decorative pine tree logo cut outs just below the peak on the east and west gable ends of the building and at the crest of the two dormers.
- The Unity Ranger Station has a combined fire lookout and water tower located on the compound. The 60-foot (18 m) high, wooden tower was built by the Civilian Conservation Corps in 1938. The tower has a 7-foot (2.1 m) by 7-foot (2.1 m) cab mounted on a 12-foot (3.7 m) square deck with a catwalk enclosed by simple wooden railing. The windows have top-hinged, wooden shutters that help shade the cab when open. The tower is built with creosote treated Douglas-fir timbers. There is a wooden stairway leading up to the cab. There is a wooden water tank located just below the cab. The tower structure has never been modified so it remains true to its original design.
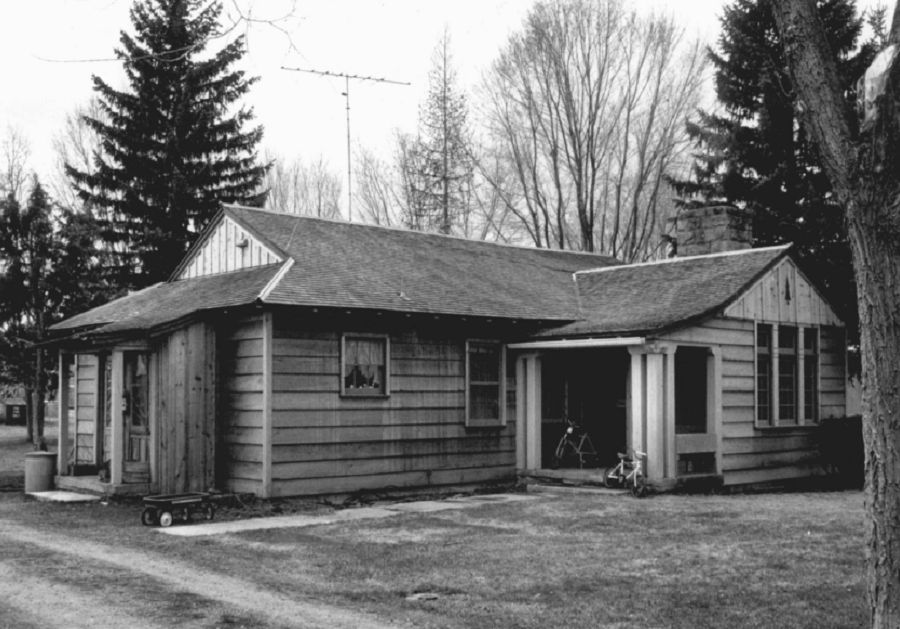
*Residence #1051

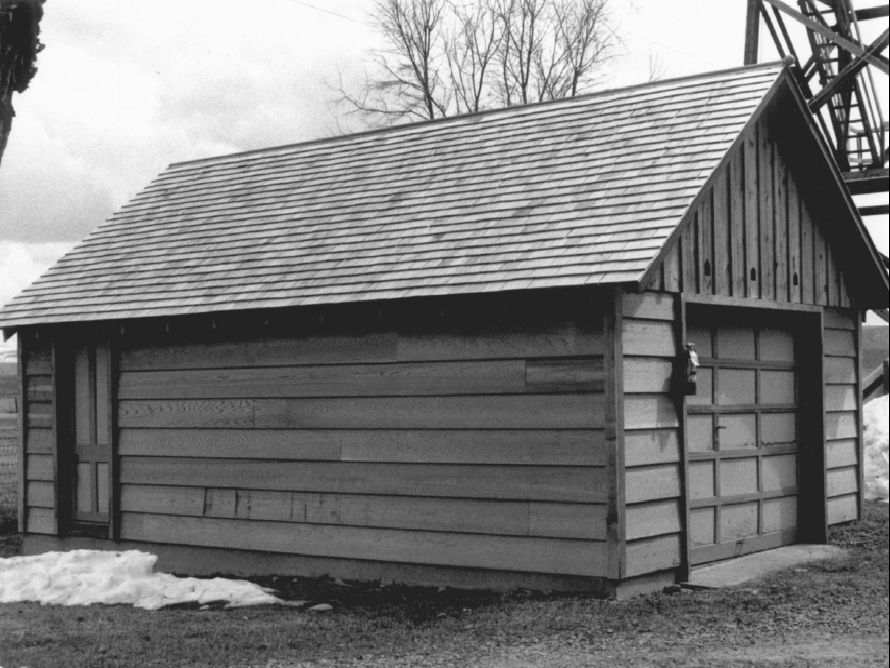
*Residential garage

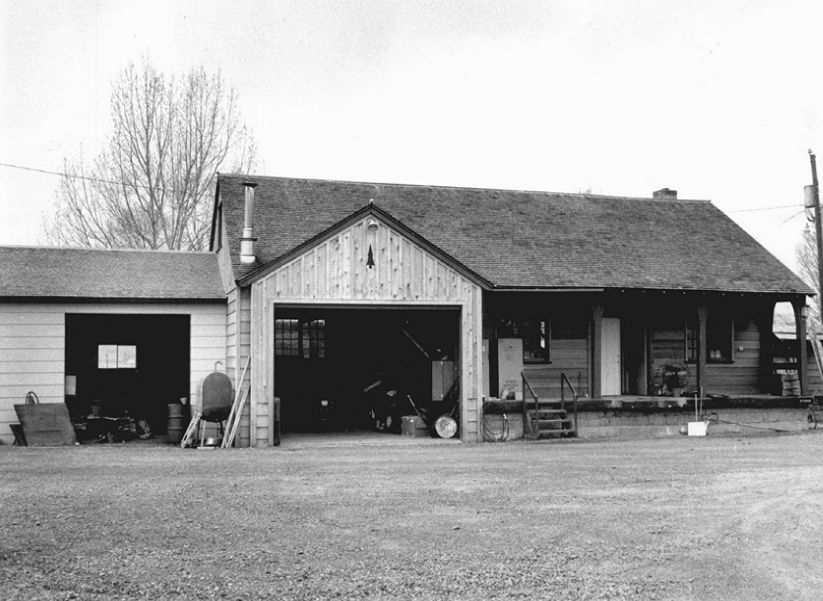
*Equipment warehouse

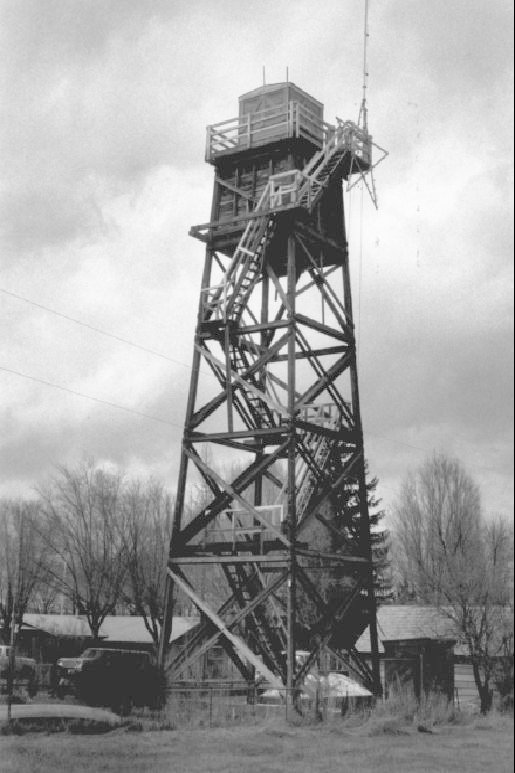
*Fire lookout tower

== Location ==
The Unity Ranger Station is located in the small unincorporated community of Unity, Oregon. Unity is in southwestern corner of Baker County, Oregon surrounded by the Wallowa-Whitman National Forest. Today, the historic ranger station is part of the Whitman Ranger District. The area of the Whitman Ranger District that used to be administered from the Unity Ranger Station is the southern part of the Wallowa-Whitman National Forest. The elevation at the ranger station is 4,038 feet (1,231 m) above sea level. The forest around the ranger station is dominated by large stands of Ponderosa pine.

Unity is 48 miles (77 km) southwest of Baker City on Oregon Route 245. John Day, Oregon, is 49 miles (79 km) west of Unity on U.S. Highway 26. Vale, Oregon, is 65 miles (105 km) southeast of Unity on U.S. 26. The historic Unity Ranger Station compound is on the south side of Main Street (U.S. 26) near the center of the Unity town site.
