= Joe Bush (ghost) =

Ghost legend from Oregon, United States

Coordinates: 44.7425°N 118.2041°W

Joe Bush is a legendary ghost said to haunt the Sumpter Valley Gold Dredge in Sumpter, Oregon, United States. According to legend, dredge workers on the No. 42 dredge at Sumpter Valley claim the ghost leaves wet, bare footprints on the dredge's decks, causes lights to flicker, and doors to open and close unexpectedly.

== History ==
According to Wes Dickson, an employee of the Sumpter dredge during the 1940s, "it all started as a joke, and I'd blame George Hansen", explaining that Hansen was a fellow employee who spread the legend of Joe Bush. George Hansen said that, "anything that happened on the dredge, or something went wrong, it was Joe Bush".

== Popular culture ==
In the Skeleton Creek book series, a man named Henry, trying to get gold from the dredge, pretends to be the ghost of Joe Bush.

== See also ==
- List of ghosts
- Madam Koi Koi
