= Armstrong Nugget =

Gold nugget

The Armstrong Nugget is a gold nugget that was found June 19, 1913, by George Armstrong, at a placer mine near Susanville in Grant County, Oregon, United States. The nugget weighs 80.4 ounces.

Today the nugget can be seen in a gold mining display at the U.S. Bank in Baker City.
