= Oregon Route 245 =

State highway in Baker County, Oregon, US

Oregon Route 245
- Route 245 highlighted in red

Route information
- Maintained by ODOT
- Length: 36.62 mi (58.93 km)
- Existed: 1981–present

Major junctions
- South end: US 26 near Unity
- North end: OR 7 in Salisbury

Location
- Country: United States
- State: Oregon
- County: Baker

Highway system
- Oregon Highways; Interstate; US; State; Named; Scenic
← OR 244	→ OR 250

Oregon Route 245 (OR 245) is an Oregon state highway running from Salisbury to Unity. OR 245 is known as the Dooley Mountain Highway No. 415 (see Oregon highways and routes). It is 38.62 miles (62.15 km) long and runs north–south, entirely within Baker County.

OR 245 was the highest-numbered state route in Oregon before 2002, when the state began issuing route numbers to previously unrouted highways.

== Route description ==
OR 245 begins at an intersection with US 26 near Unity and continues north, east, and north through Hereford to Salisbury, where it ends at an intersection with OR 7.

== History ==
The Dooley Mountain Highway can be traced to a private toll road constructed in the mid-19th century. It was owned by John J. Dooley, an Eastern Oregon pioneer who arrived in 1862, and the mountain was subsequently named after him. In 1889, it was acquired by Baker County and became a public road.

The road was made part of the Baker-Unity Highway in 1917. In 1932, the Baker-Unity Highway was designated OR 7.

In 1981, the Baker-Unity Highway was divided between the Whitney Highway No. 71 and the Dooley Mountain Highway. The Dooley Mountain Highway was redesignated OR 245.

== Major intersections ==
The entire route is in Baker County.

Location	mi	km	Destinations	Notes
Unity	0.00– 0.27	0.00– 0.43	US 26 – Unity, Prairie City, John Day, Vale, Mount Vernon, Ontario	Wye intersection
Salisbury	36.62	58.93	OR 7 – Baker City, Sumpter, John Day	
1.000 mi = 1.609 km; 1.000 km = 0.621 mi
