= Salisbury, Oregon =

Unincorporated community in the state of Oregon, United States

- Unincorporated community
- Location within Oregon Location within the United States
- Coordinates: 44°39′12″N 117°52′24″W
- Country: United States
- State: Oregon
- County: Baker
- Elevation: 3,655 ft (1,114 m)
- Time zone: UTC-8 (Pacific (PST))
  - Summer (DST): UTC-7 (PDT)
- Area codes: 458 and 541
- GNIS feature ID: 1136726

Salisbury is an unincorporated historic community in Baker County, Oregon, United States. It lies along the Powder River at the junction of Oregon Route 7 and Oregon Route 245 about 10 miles (16 km) southwest of Baker City. The elevation is 3,655 feet (1,114 m).

The place was once named "Bennett", probably after a local resident. Salisbury post office, established in 1906 and closed in 1907, was named after Hiram H. Salisbury, a superintendent for the W. H. Eccles Lumber Company. Salisbury was also a station on the Sumpter Valley Railway. In 1940, Salisbury had a population of 4. As of 1980, "there was little evidence of commercial activity".
