= Susanville, Oregon =

Susanville
- Ghost town
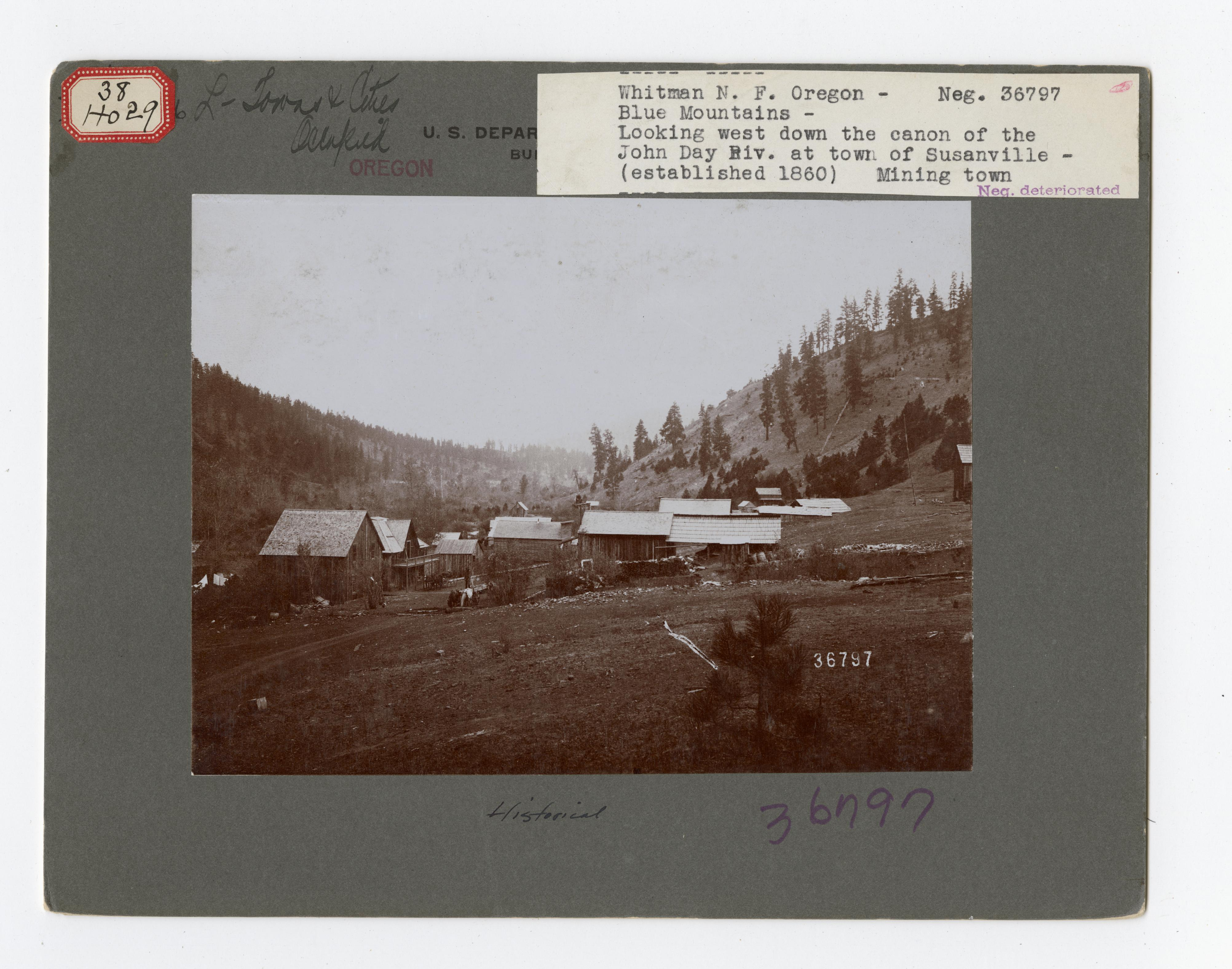
- Susanville, 1905

- Location in Oregon
- Coordinates: 44°42′48″N 118°47′02″W
- Country: United States
- State: Oregon
- County: Grant
- Elevation: 3,848 ft (1,173 m)
- Time zone: Pacific

Susanville is a ghost town in Grant County, Oregon, United States, in the Blue Mountains about two miles up Elk Creek from Galena. The place was started as a gold mining camp in 1862 or 1864.

== History ==
Susanville was originally where Galena is located now. Susanville post office was established in 1888, but was moved by miners two miles up Elk Creek in 1901, and Galena post office replaced the one at Susanville's original location. The story goes that the miners of the "New Susanville" actually stole the post office, including its mailboxes, canceling stamp, inkpad. The Susanville office ran until 1952, after which mail went to Bates.

In 1913, the 80-oz Armstrong Nugget was found in the Susanville area.

Susanville had only one street because Elk Creek canyon was too narrow for more. In its heyday, the camp had a store and a ten-stamp stamp mill. As many as 1000 miners would come to town on Saturday nights.

== See also ==
- List of ghost towns in Oregon
