= Sumpter Valley Railway =

Historic railway in Oregon, USA

- Locale: Sumpter, Oregon
- Terminus: McEwen, Oregon

Commercial operations
- Name: Sumpter Valley Railway
- Original gauge: 3 ft (914 mm)

Preserved operations
- Owned by: David Eccles
- Operated by: Sumpter Valley Railroad Restoration Inc.
- Stations: 2
- Length: 5.1 miles (8.2 km)
- Preserved gauge: 3 ft (914 mm)

Commercial history
- Opened: 1890
- Sumpter Valley Railway Historic District
- U.S. National Register of Historic Places
- U.S. Historic district
- Location within Oregon Location within the United States
- Nearest city: Bates, Oregon
- Area: 1,223.8 acres (495.3 ha)
- Built: 1890
- Architect: West, Joseph A.
- NRHP reference No.: 87001065
- Added to NRHP: August 3, 1987

The Sumpter Valley Railway, or Sumpter Valley Railroad, is a 3 ft (914 mm) narrow gauge heritage railroad located in Baker County, in the U.S. state of Oregon. Built on a right-of-way used by the original railway of the same name, it carries excursion trains on a roughly 5-mile (8.0 km) route between McEwen and Sumpter. The railroad has two steam locomotives and several other pieces of rolling stock. Passenger excursion trains operate on weekends and holidays from Memorial Day through the end of September.

== History ==
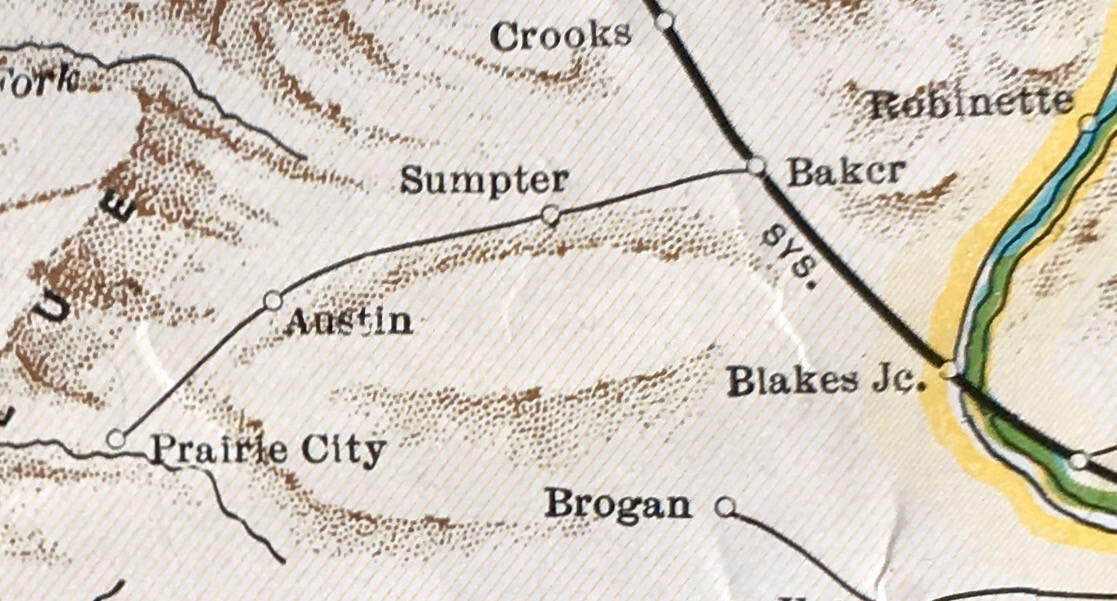
Route in 1931

The railway was incorporated in 1890 by David Eccles. The 3 ft (914 mm) narrow gauge railway's purpose was to haul logs to the Oregon Lumber Company sawmill in South Baker City. The sawmill and railroad remained separate corporations of the same owners for the life of the railroad. The builders of the railway also owned the Grande Ronde Lumber Company in Perry, Oregon, and the railway was financed by Mormons in Utah. The line was built over terrain originally considered as part of a railway from Denver, Colorado to the Pacific coast; but the Union Pacific Railroad opted for a different route to avoid bypassing growing communities which might provide an attractive opportunity for competition by the rapidly growing Oregon Railroad and Navigation Company.

Much of the original equipment came from the Utah & Northern Railway in Idaho and Montana. The Union Pacific owned the line and began converting it to standard gauge around 1887. Eccles owned a significant amount of Union Pacific stock, exerting enough influence to acquire the now-unneeded narrow gauge equipment. The first locomotive to arrive was a small 4-4-0 numbered 285; the Sumpter Valley also purchased a number of the U&N's Brooks 2-6-0 locomotives, along with a large number of boxcars and flatcars. In 1906, the railroad also acquired four locomotives from the Tonopah Railway (later the Tonopah & Goldfield Railroad).

By 1891, the line had reached McEwen, 22 miles (35 km) west of Baker City, and the railroad began offering passenger and freight service. To reach uncut forests further west, the company extended the line in stages. It reached Sumpter in 1896 and continued southwestward to Whitney, Tipton, Austin and Bates. By 1910, it arrived in Prairie City, a ranching and mining community along the John Day River in Grant County. The railroad continued to use wood fuel for their locomotives until converting to oil fuel in June, 1940. Diamond-shaped smokestacks were replaced by cabbage-shaped Rushton stacks after 1916.

Ten years later, the railway began losing business to automobiles and trucks, and in 1933 the 20 miles (32 km) of track between Prairie City and Bates were abandoned. Scheduled passenger service on the remaining line ended in 1937. Freight service remained, however, and in 1939 the railway purchased two 2-6-6-2T Mallet locomotives from the Uintah Railway in Colorado. These engines were converted from coal to oil burners and given tenders from two 2-8-2 locomotives. As traffic declined, the railway sold off the other, unneeded locomotives. In 1947, the railroad ceased all operations except for 1.5 miles (2.4 km) of track in the Oregon Lumber Company yard in South Baker City. This last section was abandoned and removed in 1961.

== Heritage operation ==
In 1971, a group of volunteers set out to rebuild the Sumpter Valley Railway. Locomotive No. 3, a 1915 Heisler steam locomotive, was restored to operation in 1976, and the new railway opened for business on July 4, 1976, over a track of less than 1 mile (1.6 km). The Sumpter Valley Railroad Restoration Inc. was created and 6 miles of track were reinstalled by hand over the next 15 years, to connect the McEwen, Oregon station with Sumpter, Oregon. SVR No. 19, a 2-8-2 steam locomotive built in 1920, was restored to operating condition in 1996. Sister locomotive 20 is also located at the railroad. In 2018, #720 was added to the railroad operating fleet after an overhaul. It previously was used by the Chiquita Banana company.

In 2007, the railway opened its reproduction of the original Sumpter Depot, within sight of the Sumpter Valley Dredge State Heritage Area operated by the Oregon Parks and Recreation Department. The railway operates a number of historic Sumpter Valley Railroad and adjoining 3 ft (914 mm) narrow gauge logging railroad steam locomotives and equipment on the line every summer.

In Prairie City at the western end of the original line, the Sumpter Valley Depot Restoration Committee renovated the Sumpter Valley Railway Passenger Station in the 1970s. The City of Prairie City has used it to house the DeWitt Museum since 1984. Its collections include lanterns, lights, and other railway artifacts, and photographs of train wrecks and of life along the rail line.

== Gallery ==
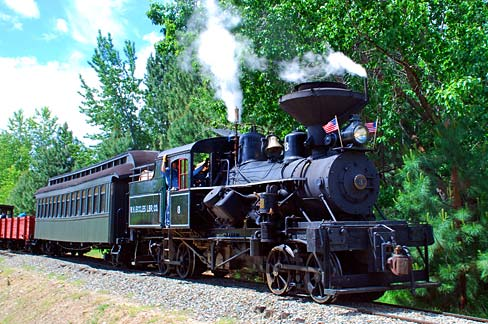
Excursion train on the line in 2010

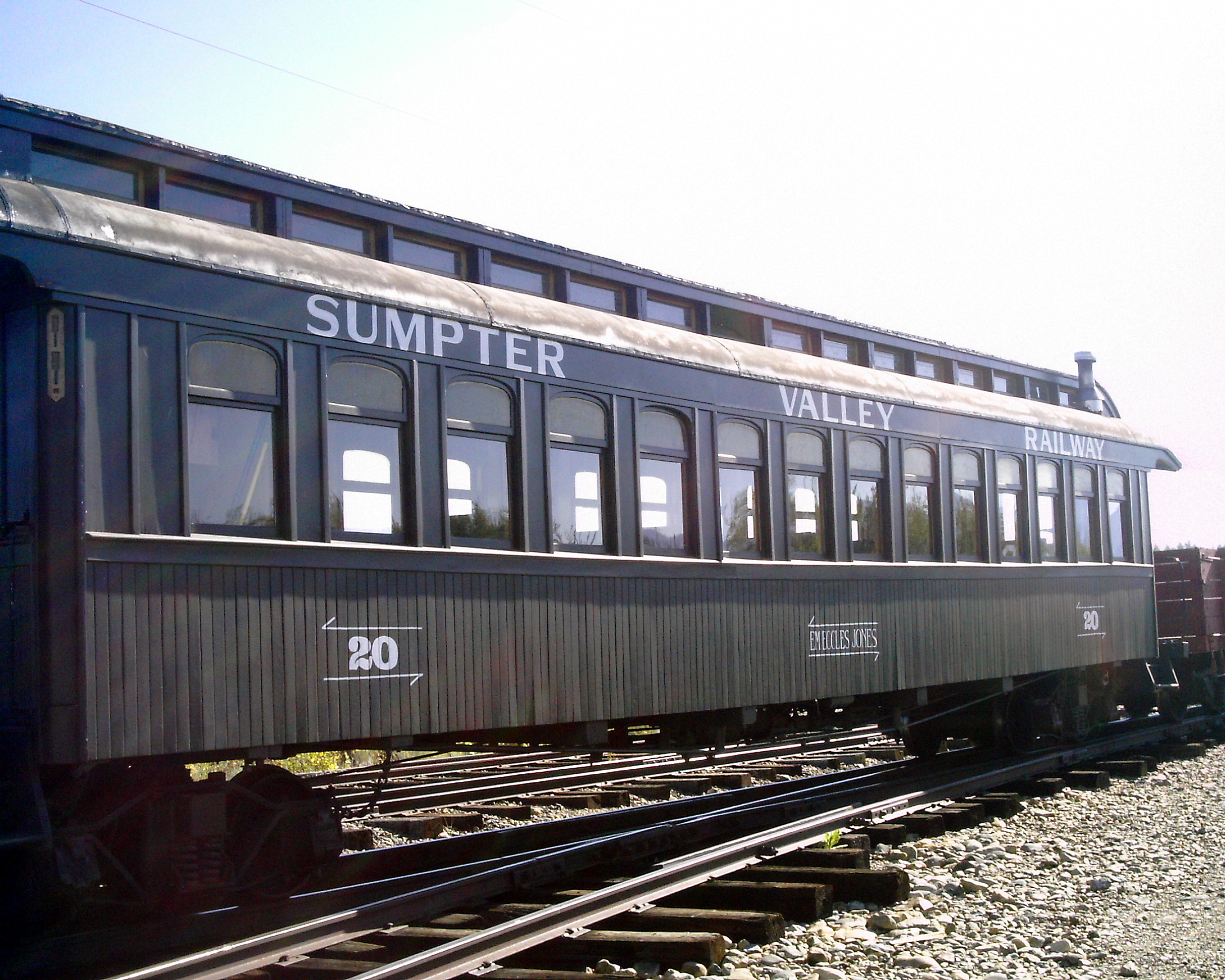
Railcar of the Sumpter Valley Line

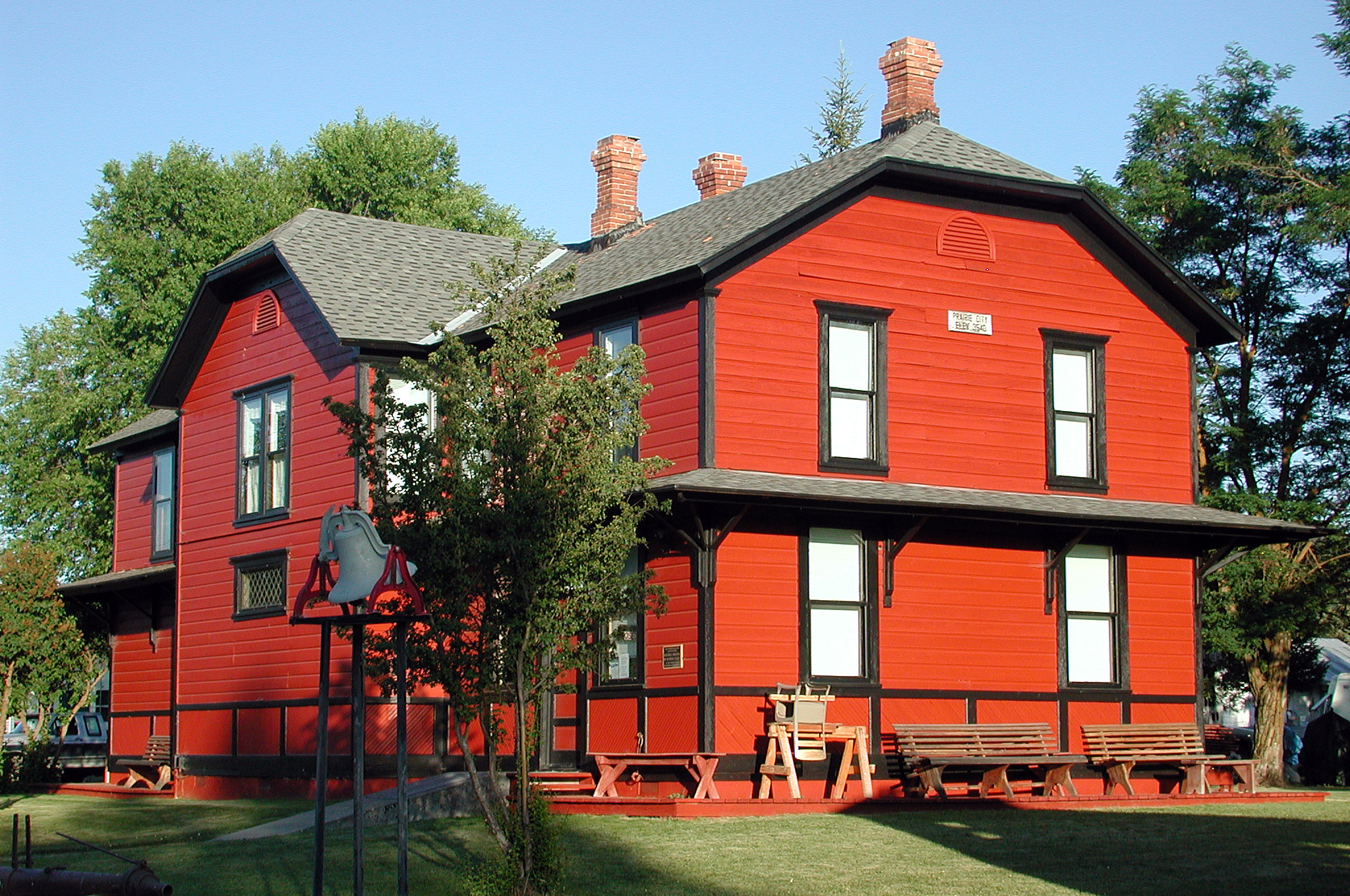
DeWitt Museum in Prairie City, Oregon, a former SVR passenger station

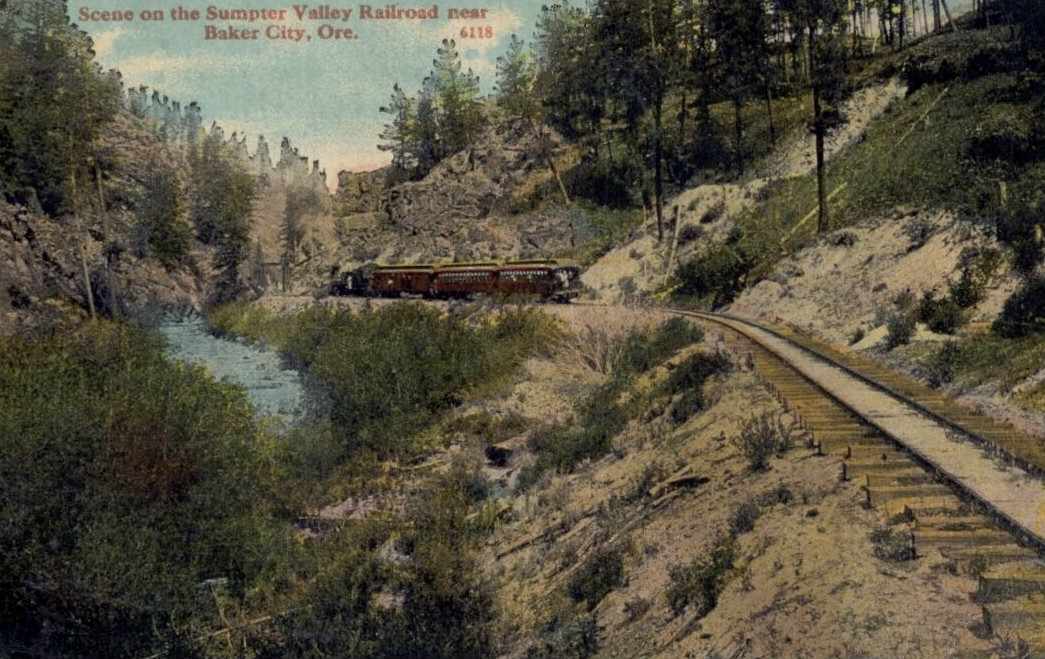
Scene near Baker City, Oregon in 1913.

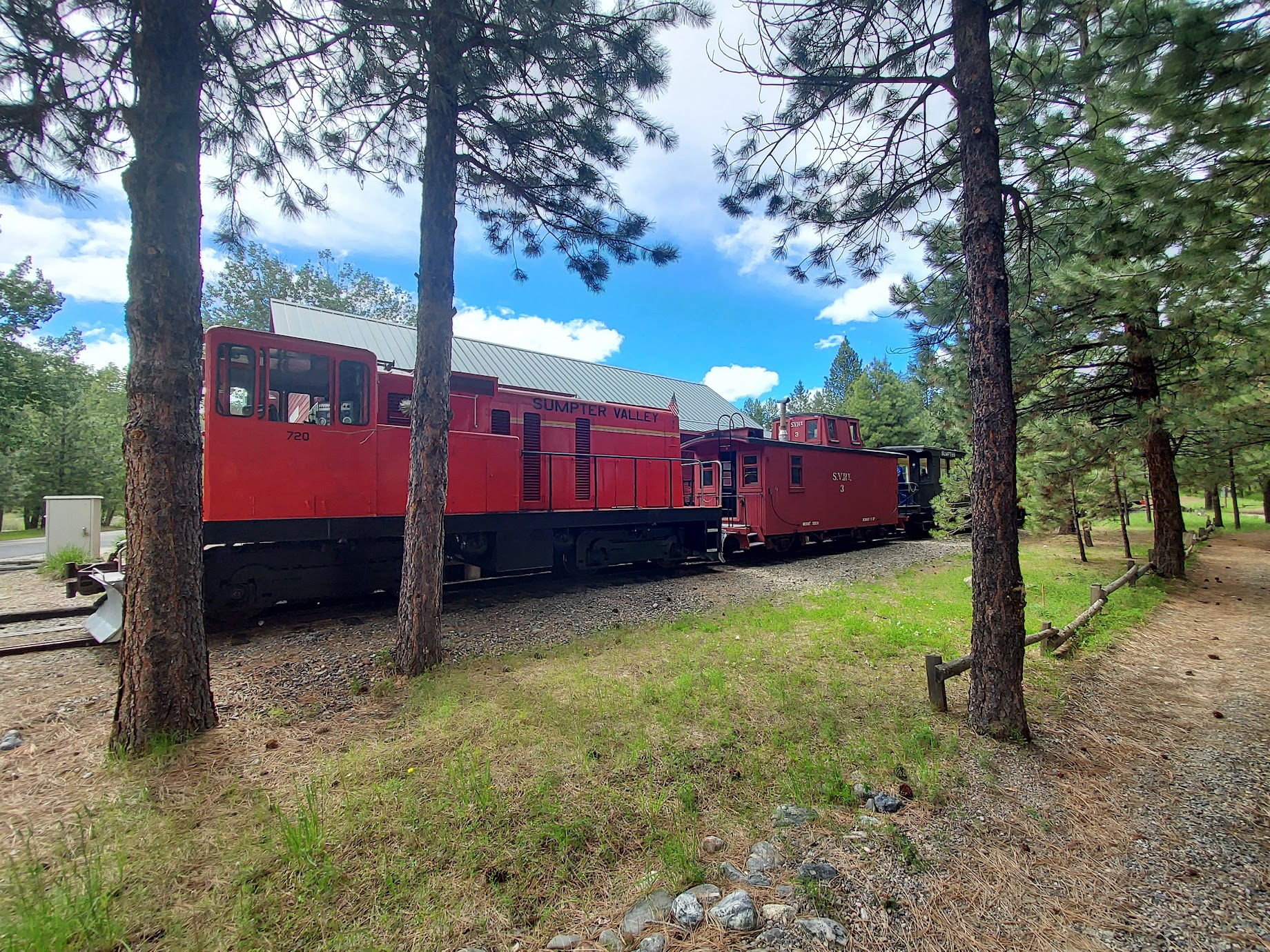
720 at station.

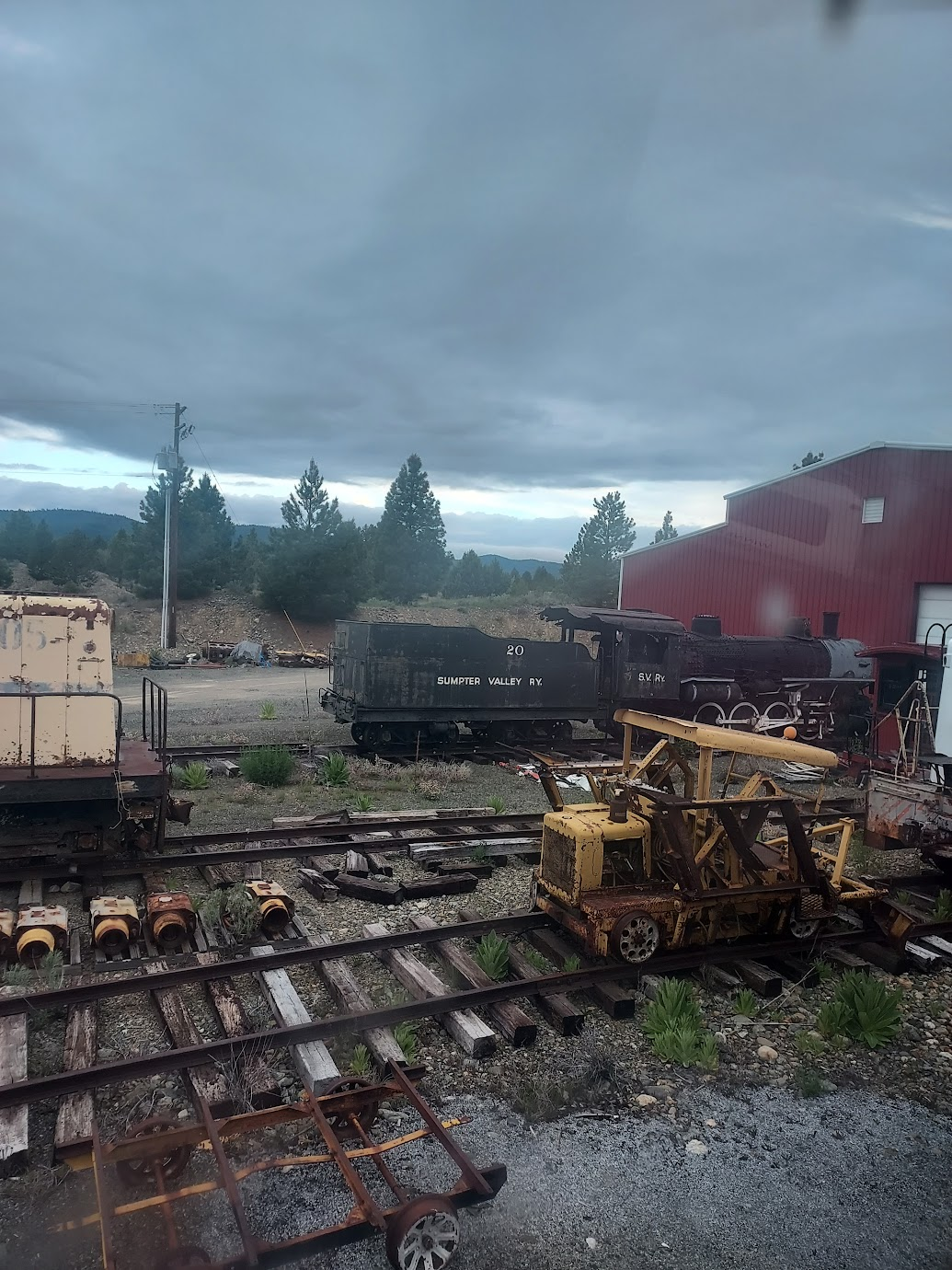
SVRR 20 in back shop.

== Locomotives ==
Number	Builder	Type	Date	Works number	Notes
1st #1	Lima Locomotive Works	Shay	1889	244	purchased from Sunny South Lumber Company in 1897
2nd #1	Brooks Locomotive Works	2-6-0	1881		purchased from Utah & Northern Ry
3rd #1	Baldwin Locomotive Works	2-6-0	1901	19211	purchased from Tonopah Ry in 1910
1st #2	Brooks Locomotive Works	2-6-0	1881		purchased from Utah & Northern Ry
2nd #2	Baldwin Locomotive Works	2-6-0	1901	19210	purchased from Tonopah Ry in 1910
1st #3	Baldwin Locomotive Works	2-8-0	1888	9519	purchased from Tonopah Ry in 1910
2nd #3	Heisler Locomotive Works	Heisler			purchased 1971
4	Baldwin Locomotive Works	2-6-0	1904	24689	purchased from Tonopah Ry in 1907
5	Brooks Locomotive Works	2-6-0	1881	530	purchased from Utah & Northern Ry; sold to Eureka and Palisade Railroad in 1912
6	Baldwin Locomotive Works	4-4-0	1880	4982	purchased from Utah & Northern Ry
7		2-8-0			Denver and Rio Grande Western Railroad C-16 class
8		2-8-0			ex-Denver and Rio Grande Western Railroad C-16 class; sold to Eureka and Palisade Railroad in 1912
9		2-8-0			ex-Denver and Rio Grande Western Railroad C-16 class; sold to Eureka and Palisade Railroad in 1912
10	Baldwin Locomotive Works	2-8-0	1880	5164	ex-Denver and Rio Grande Western Railroad C-16 class; sold to Eureka and Palisade Railroad in 1912
11	Baldwin Locomotive Works	2-6-0	1878	4429	ex-Utah & Northern Ry; scrapped 1942
12	Brooks Locomotive Works	2-6-0	1881		purchased from Utah & Northern Ry
13	Baldwin Locomotive Works	2-6-0	1881		purchased from Minnesota, Lyndale and Minnetonka Railroad
1st #14	Baldwin Locomotive Works	2-8-0	1881	5932	purchased from Connotton Valley Railway
2nd #14	Baldwin Locomotive Works	2-8-0	1906	28806	purchased from Eureka and Palisade Railroad in 1912
15	Baldwin Locomotive Works	2-6-0	1890	11075	purchased from Eureka and Palisade Railroad in 1912
16	Baldwin Locomotive Works	2-8-2	1915	42073	purchased new; sold to Peru in 1945
17	Baldwin Locomotive Works	2-8-2	1915	42074	purchased new; sold to Peru in 1945
18	Baldwin Locomotive Works	2-8-2	1915	42075	purchased new; sold to Peru in 1945
19	American Locomotive Company	2-8-2	1920	61981	purchased new as #100; sold to White Pass and Yukon Route in 1941; returned in 1977
20	American Locomotive Company	2-8-2	1920	61980	purchased new as #101; sold to White Pass and Yukon Route in 1941; returned in 1977
50	Baldwin Locomotive Works	4-6-0	1916	42865	purchased new; sold to Peru in 1945
250	Baldwin Locomotive Works	2-6-6-2T	6/1926	59261	purchased from Uintah Railway in 1940; sold to International Railways of Central America of Guatemala in 1947
251	Baldwin Locomotive Works	2-6-6-2T	4/1928	60470	purchased from Uintah Railway in 1940; sold to International Railways of Central America of Guatemala in 1947
285	Grant Locomotive Works	4-4-0	1870s		purchased from Utah & Northern Ry; used for construction prior to beginning rail service

== See also ==
- List of heritage railroads in the United States
- List of defunct Oregon railroads
