= Austin Junction, Oregon =

Unincorporated community in the state of Oregon, United States

Austin Junction
- Unincorporated community
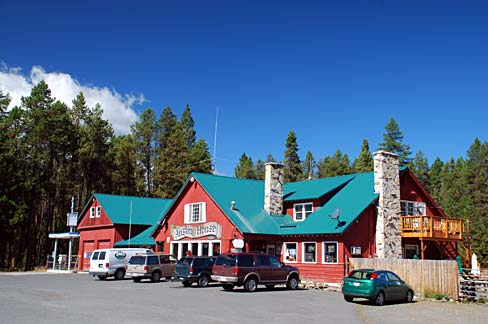
- Road house at Austin Junction
- Interactive map of Austin Junction
- Coordinates: 44.574046°N 118.501611°W
- Country: United States
- State: Oregon
- County: Grant
- Elevation: 4,236 ft (1,291 m)
- Time zone: UTC-8 (Pacific (PST))
  - Summer (DST): UTC-7 (PDT)

Austin Junction is an unincorporated community in Grant County, Oregon, United States. It is at the intersection of U.S. Route 26 and Oregon Route 7, about 2.5 miles (4.0 km) south of Austin in the Wallowa–Whitman National Forest. The Austin House, a combination café, grocery store, gas station and tavern at this location is named after an early business in nearby Austin. The business is located on Forest Service land and operates with a special-use permit. Austin Junction has a Bates, Oregon mailing address. The elevation is 4,236 feet (1291 m).
