= Middle Fork John Day River =

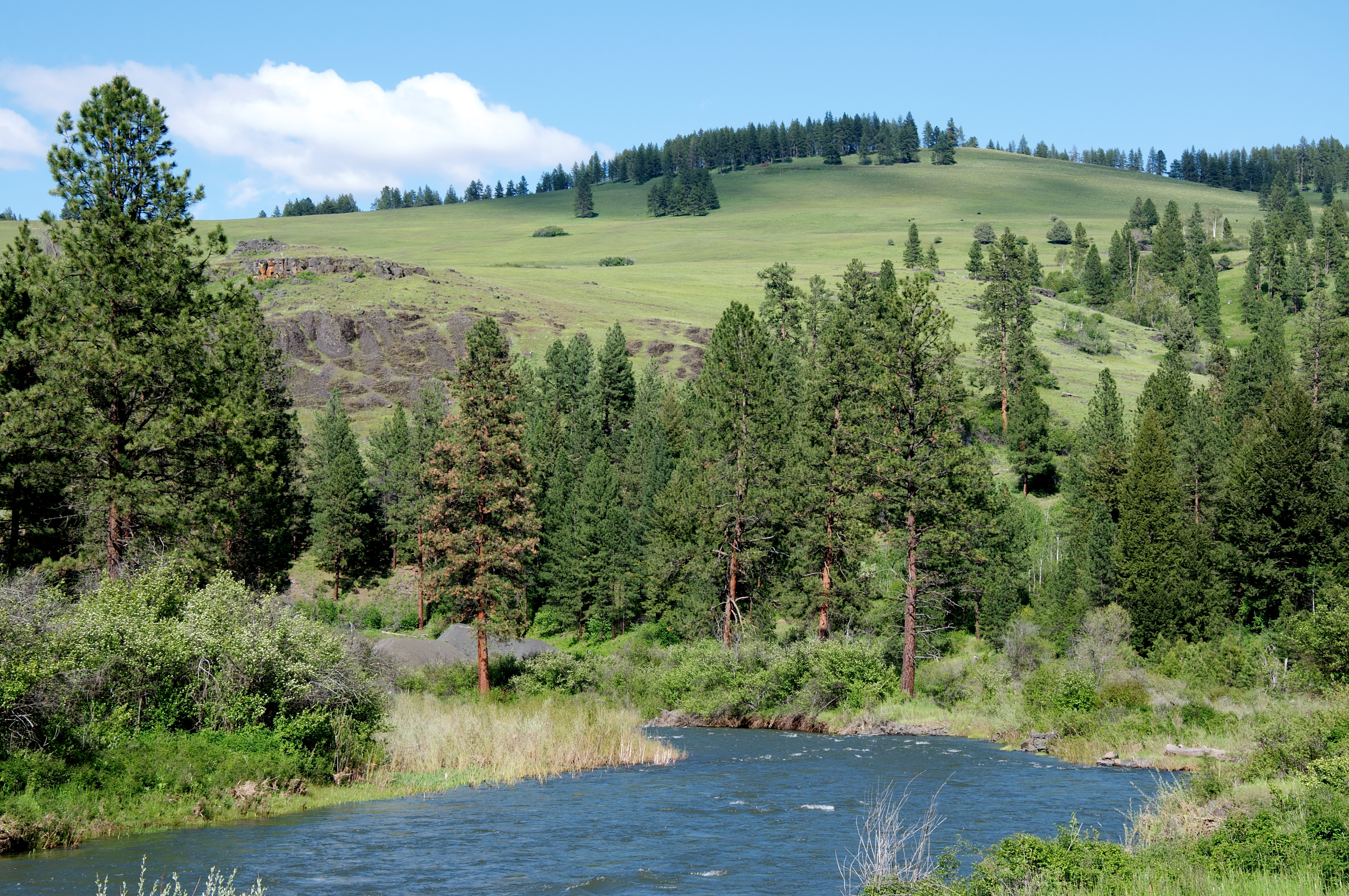
- Middle Fork John Day River

- Location of the mouth of the Middle Fork John Day River in Oregon
- Etymology: John Day, fur trapper

Location
- Country: United States
- State: Oregon
- County: Grant

Physical characteristics
- Source: Blue Mountains
  - location: near Austin, Grant County, Oregon
  - coordinates: 44°35′05″N 118°25′48″W
  - elevation: 4,254 ft (1,297 m)
- Mouth: North Fork John Day River
  - location: near Slickear Mountain, Grant County, Oregon
  - coordinates: 44°54′59″N 119°18′08″W
  - elevation: 2,192 ft (668 m)
- Length: 73.4 mi (118.1 km)
- Basin size: 806 sq mi (2,090 km^{2})
- Discharge
  - location: Ritter, Oregon, 14.9 miles (24.0 km) from the mouth
  - average: 266 cu ft/s (7.5 m^{3}/s)
  - minimum: 0.90 cu ft/s (0.025 m^{3}/s)
  - maximum: 5,430 cu ft/s (154 m^{3}/s)

The Middle Fork John Day River is a 73-mile (117 km) tributary of the North Fork John Day River in the U.S. state of Oregon. It originates in the Blue Mountains of northeast Oregon in the Malheur National Forest near Austin and flows generally west to the North Fork about 18 miles (29 km) above Monument. The Middle Fork drainage basin covers about 806 square miles (2,090 km^{2}).

The Oregon Scenic Waterways Program, administered by the Oregon Parks and Recreation Department (OPRD), protects the river for most of its length. The state lists a 60-mile (97 km) segment of the Middle Fork from about 71 miles (114 km) from the mouth to about 11 miles (18 km) from the mouth as a Scenic River Area and the lower 11 miles (18 km) as a Natural River Area. People planning to cut trees, mine, build roads or structures, or make other substantial changes within 1/4 mile (0.40 km) of the river must first notify OPRD and seek its approval.

== See also ==
- List of rivers of Oregon
- List of longest streams of Oregon
