= Sumpter Valley Gold Dredge =

- U.S. National Register of Historic Places
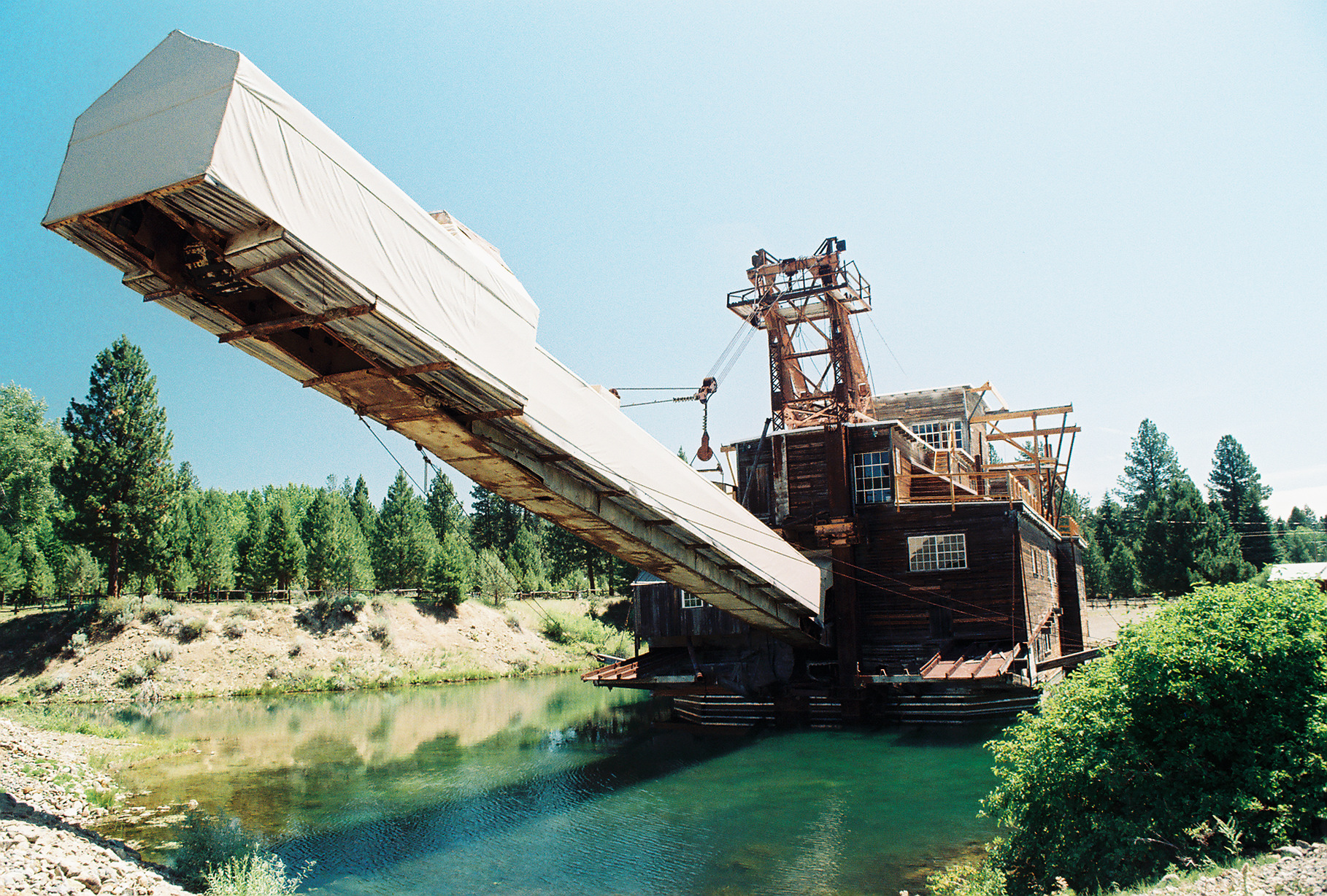
- Sumpter Valley Gold Dredge

- Location within Oregon Location within the United States
- Location: SW of Sumpter near Cracker Creek, Sumpter, Oregon
- Coordinates: 44°44′33″N 118°12′15″W
- Area: 5 acres (2.0 ha)
- Built: 1935
- NRHP reference No.: 71000676
- Added to NRHP: October 26, 1971

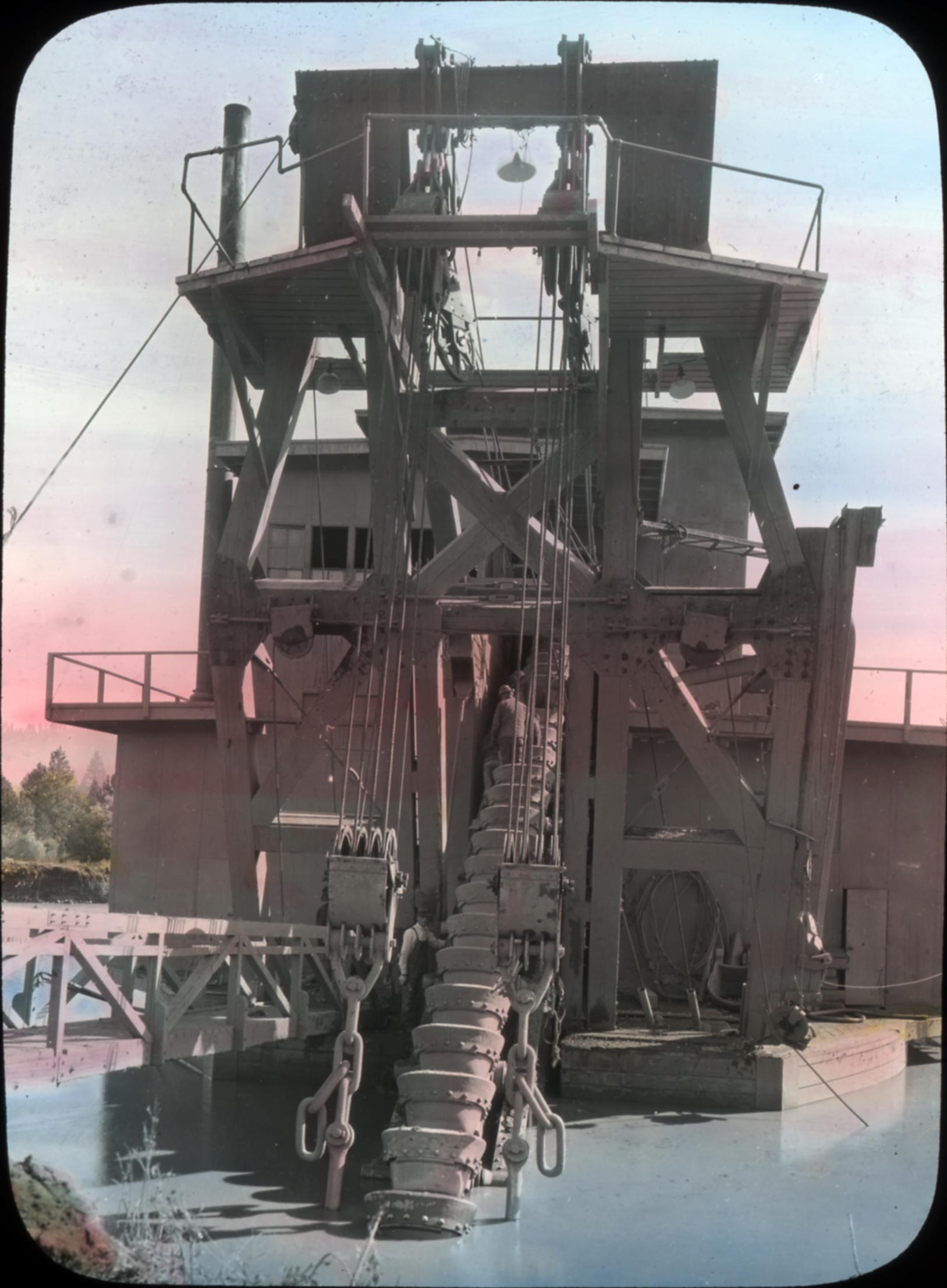
Dredge in the early 1900s

The Sumpter Valley Gold Dredge is a historic gold dredge located in Sumpter, in the U.S. state of Oregon. Gold was discovered in Sumpter in 1862. Three gold dredges were put into service in the Sumpter Valley district between 1912 and 1934.

== Description ==
A gold dredge works by having large buckets that pull the gold-bearing earth up into its machinery to be processed, keeping the gold and spewing the waste (known as "tailings") out the back by way of a stacker. Built on a shallow hull, these dredges did not need a lot of water to operate, as they moved their pond of water with them.

The internal mechanics were not very sophisticated—they duplicated, on a larger scale, many of the devices used by placer mining throughout the gold rush, such as the gold pan and the sluice box. In essence, the dirt that was dug by the large electrically powered buckets was sifted and sorted, and the remainder was washed over a series of riffles allowing the gold to settle and be trapped. The primary advantages that made the dredge more efficient than other methods were the volume of earth it could process and having its own water supply. The dredge that was built in Sumpter Valley could dig over 20 buckets per minute, consuming more than seven yards of earth each minute.

The Sumpter Valley Gold Dredge required a three-man crew to operate the machinery and 17 more workers to complete the crew for maintenance, bookkeeping, surveying, truck driving, managing and a few other roles. The dredge operated 363 days a year; most of the men were given the Fourth of July and Christmas day off from work. One or two men had to stay on board to watch over the machine during the evenings. Dredge workers often reported hearing the ghost of Joe Bush "Haunting" the dredge when the dredge was not operating due to closure or repair.

== History ==
Three dredges worked the valley from 1913 to 1954. Sumpter No. 3 was built substantially from parts of the first dredge, which had been idle for 10 years. Between them, the dredges traveled more than 8 miles (13 km), extracting $10 to 12 million worth of gold. Still, it cost more to run than the gold could pay for. The last dredge closed in 1954, more than $100,000 (~$924,006 in 2024) in debt. In its lifetime this dredge made $4.5 million at $35 per troy ounce. That is 128,570 troy ounces which, at the recent value of $1,990.00 per ounce, would be worth $255,854,300.

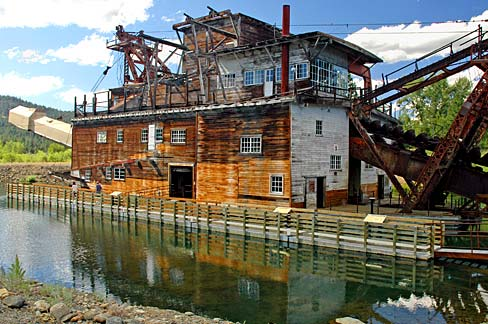
Sumpter Valley Dredge #3, 2005

The Oregon Parks and Recreation Department has preserved this historic area as the Sumpter Valley Dredge State Heritage Area. The park includes the Gold Dredge Gift Store and Museum, with a video featuring interviews with dredge workers, historic photos and artifacts. Tours of the dredge are provided. The dredge was part of a paranormal investigation on the 2013 television series Ghost Mine.

== See also ==
- National Register of Historic Places listings in Baker County, Oregon
