= Sumpter, Oregon =

- City
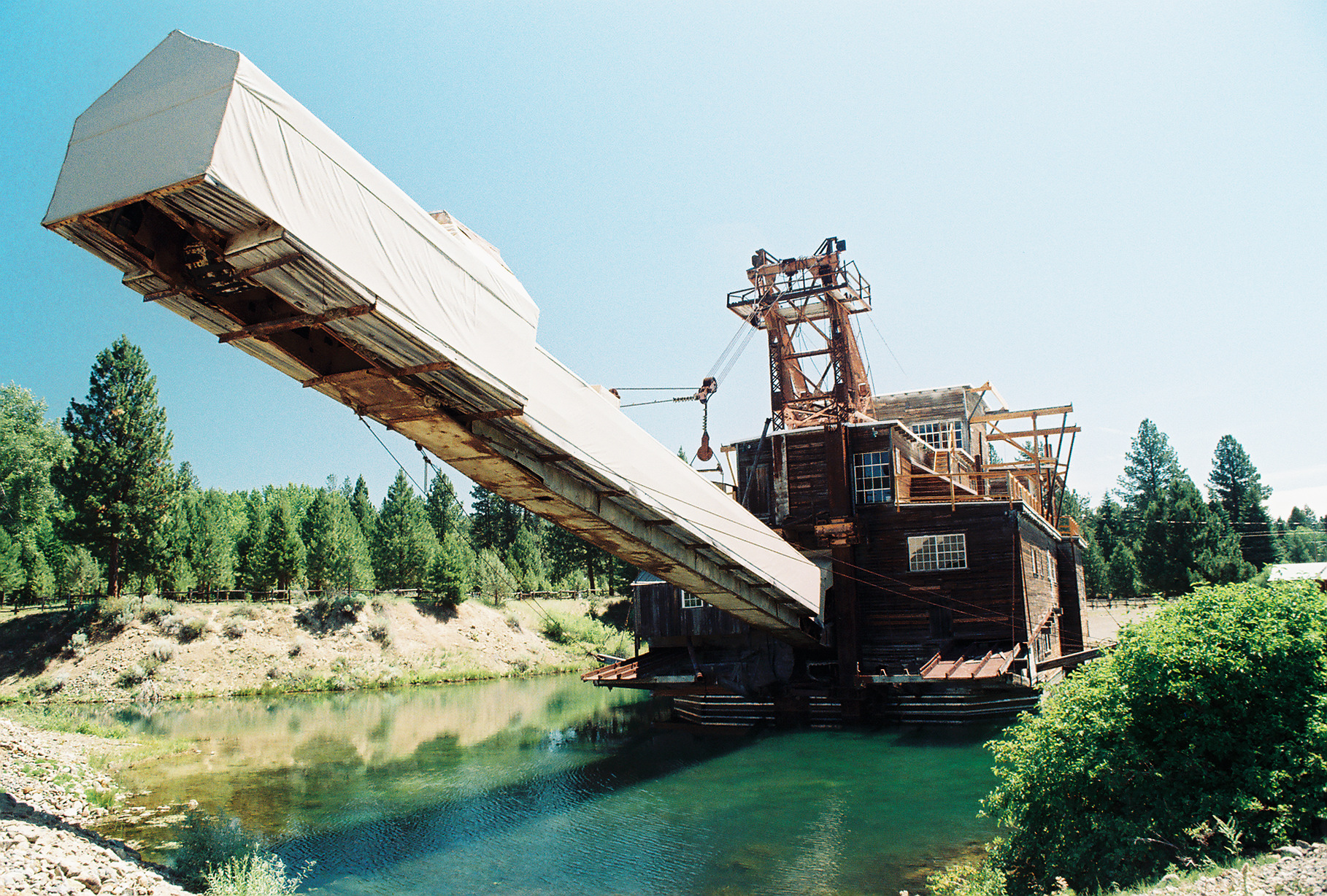
- The historic dredge at Sumpter Valley Dredge State Heritage Area recalls Sumpter's gold mining origins.

- Location in Oregon
- Coordinates: 44°44′46″N 118°11′51″W
- Country: United States
- State: Oregon
- County: Baker
- Incorporated: 1898

Government
  - Mayor: Greg Lucas

Area
  - Total: 2.18 sq mi (5.65 km^{2})
  - Land: 2.18 sq mi (5.65 km^{2})
  - Water: 0 sq mi (0.00 km^{2})
- Elevation: 4,462 ft (1,360 m)

Population (2020)
  - Total: 204
  - Density: 93/sq mi (36.1/km^{2})
- Time zone: UTC−08:00 (Pacific)
  - Summer (DST): UTC−07:00 (Pacific)
- ZIP Code: 97877
- Area codes: 458 and 541
- FIPS code: 41-71000
- GNIS feature ID: 2412002
- Website: cityofsumpteror.com

Sumpter is a city in Baker County, Oregon, United States. The population was 204 at the 2020 census. Sumpter is named after Fort Sumter by its founders. The name was inspired by a rock as smooth and round as a cannonball, which reminded a local resident of the American Civil War and Fort Sumter.

== Names ==
Baker County was named for Edward Dickinson Baker, a U.S. Senator from Oregon who was killed in the Battle of Ball's Bluff during the American Civil War. Sumpter, first settled by Euro-Americans during this war, was named after Fort Sumter in the U.S. state of South Carolina. The fort was often mentioned in war dispatches read by the settlers. An account in the Baker Democrat–Herald many decades later reported that a round rock found in the area in the early 1860s had looked to residents like a cannonball and, reinforced by the war news, had reminded them of Fort Sumter.

In 1883, Joseph D. Young became the first postmaster of Sumpter, and, according to his grandson, was not allowed by the U.S. Post Office to use the old name, Sumter. Since freight to the region then depended on pack mules, Young chose the form Sumpter, which was close to the original spelling and evoked the term sumpter mule.

== History ==
The community was platted in 1889, and became a mining boom town about 10 years later. Until transportation by rail became feasible in the area, Sumpter was little more than "a huddle of crude log cabins."

A narrow-gauge railway reached Sumpter in 1897. Built by David C. Eccles, the Sumpter Valley Railway (SVRy) ran 80 miles (130 km) from Baker City through Sumpter and on to Prairie City, which it reached in 1907. Until the line shut down in the 1930s, ranchers, mining interests, and timber companies used it to move freight.

Shortly after the SVRy arrived, the city expanded near a set of deep-shaft gold mines with a combined total of 12 miles (19 km) of tunnels. The population grew to more than 2,000. Sumpter had electric lights, churches, saloons, a brewery, sidewalks, three newspapers, and an opera house. However, as the mines played out, the city declined even before a devastating fire in 1917.

Dynamite was used to help put out the fire, which destroyed 12 blocks of the town's buildings. A few of the surviving structures remain in the 21st century and are occupied by retail shops.

== Economy ==
Sumpter relies heavily on tourism as a source of income. The town's remaining historic structures, an excursion train that runs along part of the SVRy line, and a state park devoted to a historic gold dredge make the city a tourist destination.

A 6-mile (10 km) stretch of the original SVRy has been restored and operates on summer weekends and major holidays from Memorial Day through the end of September. The excursion line has stations in Sumpter and McEwen. The Sumpter station and part of the line are within the state park, known as the Sumpter Valley Dredge State Historic Area. The dredge on display in the park was the last of three used to mine gold from surface deposits along the Powder River. It operated here from 1935 through 1954.

In 2013, the area was the location for the reality television show Ghost Mine. The plot involves a team of people looking for gold and ghosts in the "Crescent Mine" near Sumpter. According to a Baker City Herald story picked up by the Associated Press and Portland television station KATU, most of the filming was done at the Buckeye Mine group near Bourne, about 6 miles (10 km) north of Sumpter along Cracker Creek.

In 2020, Season 11 of Discovery's TV series Gold Rush was filmed in the area. The show features rookie miner Fred Lewis, a veteran, in his attempts to mine gold with his former military friends.

== Geography ==
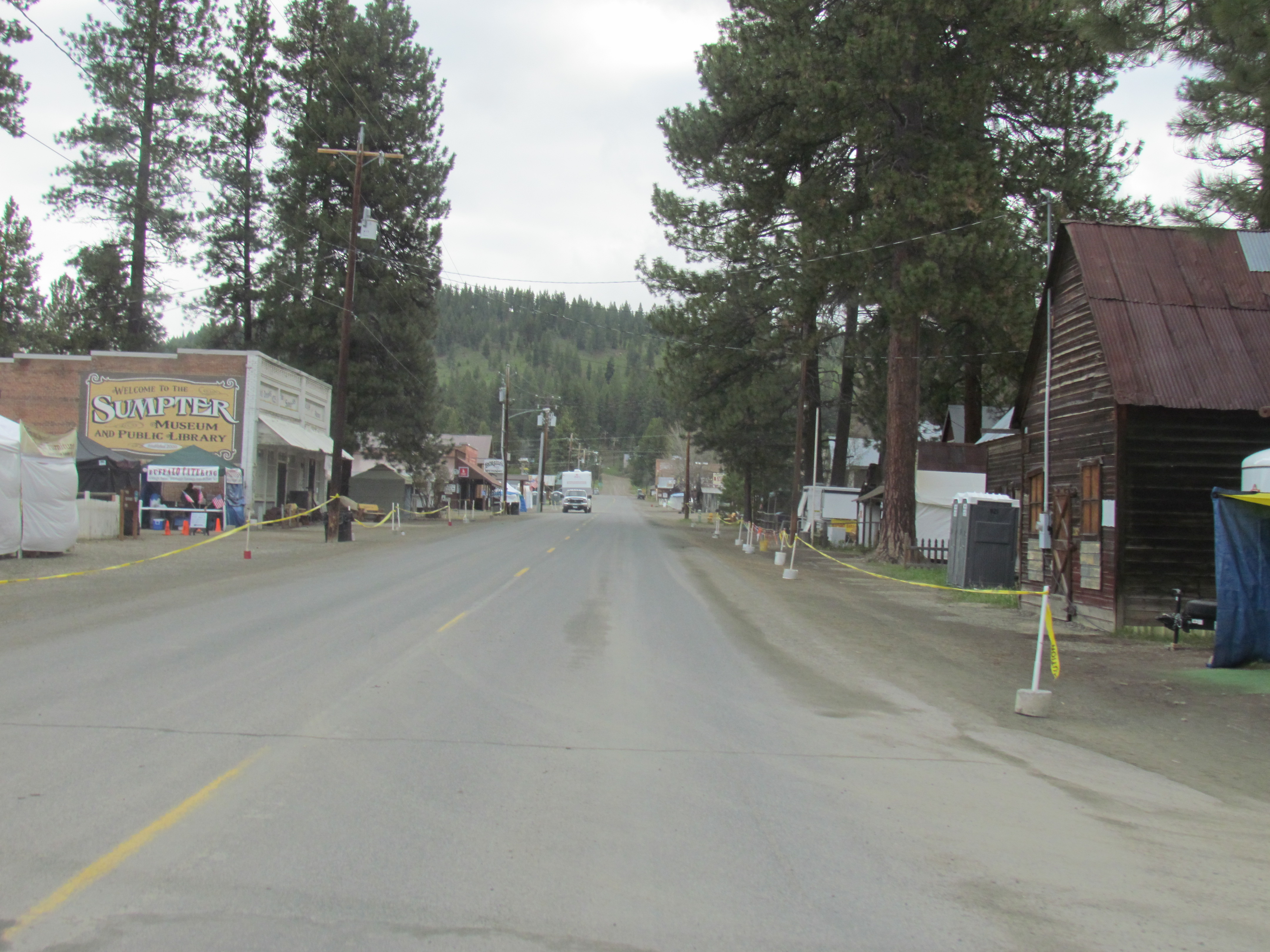
Main Street

Sumpter, about 4,400 feet (1,300 m) above sea level, is near the Wallowa–Whitman National Forest, the Blue Mountains, and a subrange of the Blue Mountains, the Elkhorn Mountains. McCully Fork and Cracker Creek meet to form the Powder River near Sumpter. According to the United States Census Bureau, the city has a total area of 2.18 square miles (5.65 km^{2}), all land.

Sumpter is along Oregon Route 410, also known as the Sumpter Highway. By highway, the city is 26 miles (42 km) from Baker City, 31 miles (50 km) from Interstate 84, and 333 miles (536 km) from Portland. A 106-mile (171 km) loop drive known as the Elkhorn Scenic Byway passes through Sumpter, connecting to Oregon Route 7 at its intersection with Route 410.

=== Climate ===
This climatic region is typified by large seasonal temperature differences, with warm to hot (and often humid) summers and cold (sometimes severely cold) winters. According to the Köppen Climate Classification system, Sumpter has a humid continental climate, abbreviated "Dfb" on climate maps.

== Demographics ==
Historical population
Census	Pop.	Note	%±
1880	261		—
1890	91		−65.1%
1900	2,216		2,335.2%
1910	643		−71.0%
1920	219		−65.9%
1930	154		−29.7%
1940	420		172.7%
1950	146		−65.2%
1960	96		−34.2%
1970	120		25.0%
1980	133		10.8%
1990	119		−10.5%
2000	171		43.7%
2010	204		19.3%
2020	204		0.0%

=== 2020 census ===
As of the 2020 census, Sumpter had a population of 204. The median age was 60.4 years. 12.3% of residents were under the age of 18 and 38.2% of residents were 65 years of age or older. For every 100 females there were 114.7 males, and for every 100 females age 18 and over there were 118.3 males age 18 and over.

0% of residents lived in urban areas, while 100.0% lived in rural areas.

There were 120 households in Sumpter, of which 16.7% had children under the age of 18 living in them. Of all households, 45.8% were married-couple households, 34.2% were households with a male householder and no spouse or partner present, and 17.5% were households with a female householder and no spouse or partner present. About 39.1% of all households were made up of individuals and 25.8% had someone living alone who was 65 years of age or older.

There were 334 housing units, of which 64.1% were vacant. Among occupied housing units, 88.3% were owner-occupied and 11.7% were renter-occupied. The homeowner vacancy rate was 4.5% and the rental vacancy rate was 6.3%.

Racial composition as of the 2020 census
Race	Number	Percent
White	185	90.7%
Black or African American	0	0%
American Indian and Alaska Native	2	1.0%
Asian	0	0%
Native Hawaiian and Other Pacific Islander	0	0%
Some other race	1	0.5%
Two or more races	16	7.8%
Hispanic or Latino (of any race)	5	2.5%

=== 2010 census ===
As of the census of 2010, there were 204 people, 119 households, and 65 families residing in the city. The population density was about 94 inhabitants per square mile (36/km^{2}). There were 307 housing units at an average density of about 141 per square mile (54/km^{2}). The racial makeup of the city was about 92% White, 2.5% Native American, 0.5% Asian, and 5% from two or more races. Hispanic or Latino of any race were 1% of the population.

There were 119 households, of which about 7% had children under the age of 18 living with them; 51% were married couples living together; 2.5% had a female householder with no husband present; less than 1% had a male householder with no wife present, and 45% were non-families. About 40% of all households were made up of individuals, and 19% had someone living alone who was 65 years of age or older. The average household size was 1.71 and the average family size was 2.22.

The median age in the city was about 62 years. About 6% of residents were under the age of 18; 3% were between the ages of 18 and 24; 8% were from 25 to 44; 49% were from 45 to 64, and 34% were 65 years of age or older. The gender makeup of the city was 54% male and 46% female.

== See also ==
- List of ghost towns in Oregon
