= Unity, Oregon =

- City
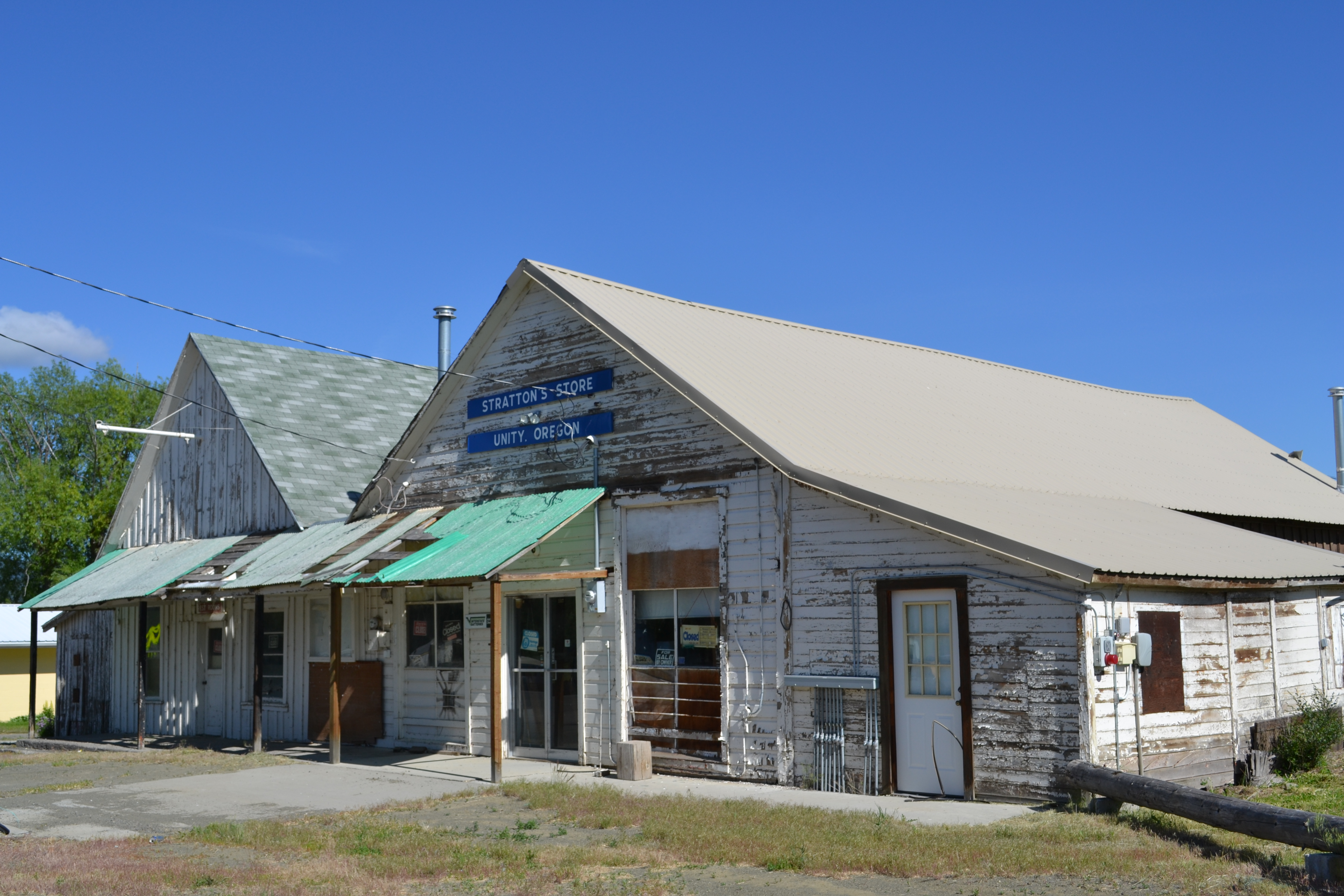
- A store in Unity

- Location in Oregon
- Coordinates: 44°26′57″N 118°11′17″W
- Country: United States
- State: Oregon
- County: Baker
- Incorporated: 1972

Government
  - General Manager: Mark Bennett

Area
  - Total: 0.65 sq mi (1.68 km^{2})
  - Land: 0.64 sq mi (1.66 km^{2})
  - Water: 0.0077 sq mi (0.02 km^{2})
- Elevation: 3,980 ft (1,210 m)

Population (2020)
  - Total: 40
  - Density: 62.5/sq mi (24.12/km^{2})
- Time zone: UTC-8 (Pacific)
  - Summer (DST): UTC-7 (Pacific)
- ZIP code: 97884
- Area code: 541
- FIPS code: 41-76250
- GNIS feature ID: 2412133

Unity is a city in Baker County, Oregon, United States, located in the Burnt River Valley. The population was 40 at the 2020 census.

== History ==
The town was never platted. A post office was established in Unity in 1891. A sawmill existed for some time. The Unity Ranger Station, which was built by the Civilian Conservation Corps, is listed on the National Register of Historic Places. In 2017, Unity experienced a total solar eclipse.

== Geography ==
According to the United States Census Bureau, the city has a total area of 0.65 square miles (1.68 km^{2}), of which, 0.64 square miles (1.66 km^{2}) is land and 0.01 square miles (0.03 km^{2}) is water.

== Climate ==
This climatic region is typified by large seasonal temperature differences, with warm to hot (and often humid) summers and cold (sometimes severely cold) winters. According to the Köppen Climate Classification system, Unity has a humid continental climate, abbreviated "Dfb" on climate maps.

Climate data for Unity
Month	Jan	Feb	Mar	Apr	May	Jun	Jul	Aug	Sep	Oct	Nov	Dec	Year
Record high °F (°C)	56 (13)	68 (20)	84 (29)	92 (33)	97 (36)	105 (41)	107 (42)	103 (39)	101 (38)	88 (31)	69 (21)	58 (14)	107 (42)
Mean daily maximum °F (°C)	32.5 (0.3)	39.3 (4.1)	47.9 (8.8)	57.7 (14.3)	66.5 (19.2)	74.7 (23.7)	85.6 (29.8)	84.6 (29.2)	74.9 (23.8)	61.8 (16.6)	44.7 (7.1)	34.6 (1.4)	58.7 (14.8)
Mean daily minimum °F (°C)	11.8 (−11.2)	17.3 (−8.2)	22.7 (−5.2)	27.8 (−2.3)	33.7 (0.9)	39 (4)	43.4 (6.3)	42.1 (5.6)	35 (2)	28 (−2)	21.4 (−5.9)	15.8 (−9.0)	28.2 (−2.1)
Record low °F (°C)	−32 (−36)	−28 (−33)	−15 (−26)	6 (−14)	11 (−12)	20 (−7)	24 (−4)	22 (−6)	11 (−12)	−2 (−19)	−21 (−29)	−33 (−36)	−33 (−36)
Average precipitation inches (mm)	1.13 (29)	0.75 (19)	0.71 (18)	0.66 (17)	1.13 (29)	1.16 (29)	0.52 (13)	0.6 (15)	0.55 (14)	0.63 (16)	1.07 (27)	1.24 (31)	10.16 (258)
Average snowfall inches (cm)	9.8 (25)	6 (15)	2.3 (5.8)	0.4 (1.0)	0.1 (0.25)	0.1 (0.25)	0 (0)	0 (0)	0 (0)	0.3 (0.76)	3.4 (8.6)	8.5 (22)	31 (79)
Average precipitation days	9	7	7	6	8	7	4	4	4	5	8	9	78

== Demographics ==
Historical population
Census	Pop.	Note	%±
1980	115		—
1990	87		−24.3%
2000	131		50.6%
2010	71		−45.8%
2020	40		−43.7%
U.S. Decennial Census

=== 2020 census ===
As of the 2020 census, Unity had a population of 40. The median age was 62.0 years. 7.5% of residents were under the age of 18 and 45.0% of residents were 65 years of age or older. For every 100 females there were 150.0 males, and for every 100 females age 18 and over there were 146.7 males age 18 and over.

0% of residents lived in urban areas, while 100.0% lived in rural areas.

There were 19 households in Unity, of which 15.8% had children under the age of 18 living in them. Of all households, 47.4% were married-couple households, 47.4% were households with a male householder and no spouse or partner present, and 5.3% were households with a female householder and no spouse or partner present. About 36.8% of all households were made up of individuals and 15.8% had someone living alone who was 65 years of age or older.

There were 47 housing units, of which 59.6% were vacant. Among occupied housing units, 84.2% were owner-occupied and 15.8% were renter-occupied. The homeowner vacancy rate was 26.1% and the rental vacancy rate was 25.0%.

Racial composition as of the 2020 census
Race	Number	Percent
White	36	90.0%
Black or African American	0	0%
American Indian and Alaska Native	1	2.5%
Asian	0	0%
Native Hawaiian and Other Pacific Islander	0	0%
Some other race	1	2.5%
Two or more races	2	5.0%
Hispanic or Latino (of any race)	2	5.0%

=== 2010 census ===
As of the census of 2010, there were 71 people, 36 households, and 20 families living in the city. The population density was 110.9 inhabitants per square mile (42.8/km^{2}). There were 58 housing units at an average density of 90.6 per square mile (35.0/km^{2}). The racial makeup of the city was 83.1% White, 4.2% Native American, and 12.7% Asian. Hispanic or Latino of any race were 8.5% of the population.

There were 36 households, of which 22.2% had children under the age of 18 living with them, 38.9% were married couples living together, 5.6% had a female householder with no husband present, 11.1% had a male householder with no wife present, and 44.4% were non-families. 41.7% of all households were made up of individuals, and 16.6% had someone living alone who was 65 years of age or older. The average household size was 1.97 and the average family size was 2.65.

The median age in the city was 49.6 years. 18.3% of residents were under the age of 18; 0.0% were between the ages of 18 and 24; 25.2% were from 25 to 44; 32.4% were from 45 to 64; and 23.9% were 65 years of age or older. The gender makeup of the city was 56.3% male and 43.7% female.

=== 2000 census ===
As of the census of 2000, there were 131 people, 57 households, and 36 families living in the city. The population density was 283.0 inhabitants per square mile (109.3/km^{2}). There were 75 housing units at an average density of 162.0 per square mile (62.5/km^{2}). The racial makeup of the city was 97.71% White, 1.53% Native American, and 0.76% from two or more races. Hispanic or Latino of any race were 2.29% of the population.

There were 57 households, out of which 35.1% had children under the age of 18 living with them, 47.4% were married couples living together, 7.0% had a female householder with no husband present, and 35.1% were non-families. 33.3% of all households were made up of individuals, and 8.8% had someone living alone who was 65 years of age or older. The average household size was 2.30 and the average family size was 2.89.

In the city, the population was spread out, with 29.0% under the age of 18, 10.7% from 18 to 24, 24.4% from 25 to 44, 26.7% from 45 to 64, and 9.2% who were 65 years of age or older. The median age was 37 years. For every 100 females, there were 104.7 males. For every 100 females age 18 and over, there were 97.9 males.

The median income for a household in the city was $27,679, and the median income for a family was $28,250. Males had a median income of $28,750 versus $14,375 for females. The per capita income for the city was $13,673. There were 5.3% of families and 15.8% of the population living below the poverty line, including 8.0% of under eighteens and 33.3% of those over 64.
