= National Register of Historic Places listings in Baker County, Oregon =

Location of Baker County in Oregon

This list presents the full set of buildings, structures, objects, sites, or districts designated on the National Register of Historic Places in Baker County, Oregon, United States, and offers brief descriptive information about each of them. The National Register recognizes places of national, state, or local historic significance across the United States. Out of over 90,000 National Register sites nationwide, Oregon is home to over 2,000, and 13 of those are found partially or wholly in Baker County.

This National Park Service list is complete through NPS recent listings posted June 13, 2025.

== Current listings ==
	Name on the Register	Image	Date listed	Location	City or town	Description
1	Antlers Guard Station	Antlers Guard Station	March 6, 1991 (#91000166)	Wallowa–Whitman National Forest; 44°38′01″N 118°16′44″W	Whitney vicinity	This rustic-styled cabin and garage were built for the Forest Service by the Civilian Conservation Corps around 1935. They recall both the CCC's Depression-era relief programs, and the use of architecture to express the Forest Service's identity and mission in the first half of the 20th century.
2	Baker Historic District	Baker Historic District	December 14, 1978 (#78002277)	Roughly along Main Street from Madison Street to Estes Street; 44°46′29″N 117°49′53″W	Baker City	
3	Baker Municipal Natatorium	Baker Municipal Natatorium	October 17, 1977 (#77001097)	2470 Grove Street; 44°46′53″N 117°49′31″W	Baker City	
4	Churchill School	Churchill School	March 5, 2008 (#08000182)	3451 Broadway Street; 44°46′40″N 117°50′57″W	Baker City	
5	Robert F. and Elizabeth Clark House	Robert F. and Elizabeth Clark House	October 30, 1989 (#89001857)	1522 Washington Avenue; 44°46′38″N 117°49′25″W	Baker City	
6	Cornucopia Jailhouse	Cornucopia Jailhouse	November 24, 2014 (#14000959)	2nd Street; 45°00′25″N 117°11′49″W	Cornucopia	
7	James O. Maxwell Farmstead	James O. Maxwell Farmstead	November 6, 1986 (#86003086)	15177 Muddy Creek Lane; 44°56′17″N 117°59′37″W	Haines	
8	Ed Rand House	Ed Rand House	December 9, 1981 (#81000709)	1700 4th Street; 44°46′29″N 117°50′03″W	Baker City	
9	St. Elizabeth Hospital (Old)	St. Elizabeth Hospital (Old)	February 21, 1989 (#89000047)	2365 4th Street; 44°46′50″N 117°50′04″W	Baker City	
10	Sumpter Valley Gold Dredge	Sumpter Valley Gold Dredge	October 26, 1971 (#71000676)	Southwest of Sumpter near Cracker Creek; 44°44′33″N 118°12′15″W	Sumpter	This gold dredge was used in placer mining along the Powder River from 1935 to 1954, representing a period of mining by dredge that began in 1913. The last of three dredges in the Sumpter Valley in that period, it produced some $4.5 million in gold in its career. It is preserved as a museum.
11	Sumpter Valley Railway Historic District	Sumpter Valley Railway Historic District	August 3, 1987 (#87001065)	Roughly between Baker and Prairie City starting near the McEwen station site and west to the Dixie Pass area (See also Grant County.); 44°42′13″N 118°07′17″W	Baker City to Prairie City	This narrow-gauge railway, built in stages between 1890 and 1910, was intimately connected to the logging industry in the Blue Mountains, and also served the mining, livestock, and agricultural industries. About half of the total roadbed of the railway is included in the historic district, along with several spurs, station sites, sawmill sites, and rolling stock. Although most of the line was abandoned in 1933 and 1946 and rails removed, a small section continues to operate as a heritage railway.
12	Superintendent's House	Superintendent's House	August 20, 2004 (#04000879)	271 S. Mill Street; 44°44′39″N 118°12′08″W	Sumpter	
13	Unity Ranger Station	Unity Ranger Station	April 11, 1986 (#86000823)	Wallowa-Whitman National Forest; 44°26′12″N 118°11′17″W	Unity	

== Former listings ==
	Name on the Register	Image	Date listed	Date removed	Location	City or town	Description
1	Oregon Commercial Company Building	Oregon Commercial Company Building	June 4, 1992 (#92000666)	June 17, 2025	40-50 E. Washington Street; 44°21′04″N 117°16′03″W	Huntington	This building was destroyed in a fire on 05/24/2019.

== See also ==
- National Register of Historic Places listings in Oregon
- Listings in neighboring counties: Adams, Grant, Malheur, Wallowa, Washington, Union
- Historic preservation
- History of Oregon
- Lists of Oregon-related topics
