= Rye Valley, Oregon =

Unincorporated community in the state of Oregon, United States

- Unincorporated community
- Location within Oregon Location within the United States
- Coordinates: 44°27′50″N 117°28′39″W
- Country: United States
- State: Oregon
- County: Baker
- Elevation: 3,189 ft (972 m)
- Time zone: UTC-8 (Pacific (PST))
  - Summer (DST): UTC-7 (PDT)
- Area codes: 458 and 541
- GNIS feature ID: 1131852

Rye Valley is an unincorporated community in Baker County, in the U.S. state of Oregon. It lies along Dixie Creek, a tributary of the Burnt River, about 30 miles (48 km) southeast of Baker City. It is slightly west of Interstate 84 near Weatherby and Dixie.

The community is named for a native grass used as forage for pack animals important to the region's immigrants and miners in the 1860s. A Rye Valley post office opened on September 27, 1869, and operated intermittently between then and September 14, 1935. Nayson S. Whitcomb was the first postmaster.

On July 24, 2014, a wildfire started by lightning happened in Rye Valley. The lightning first struck on Bureau of Land Management lands; however, winds quickly drove it onto forestlands protected by the Oregon Department of Forestry. The fire took three days to fully contain.
