= Hutchinson, Oregon =

Unincorporated community in the state of Oregon, United States

- Unincorporated community
- Location within Oregon Location within the United States
- Coordinates: 44°58′18″N 117°58′40″W
- Country: United States
- State: Oregon
- County: Baker
- Elevation: 3,383 ft (1,031 m)
- Time zone: UTC-8 (Pacific (PST))
  - Summer (DST): UTC-7 (PDT)
- Area codes: 458 and 541
- GNIS feature ID: 1136404

Hutchinson is an unincorporated community in Baker County, Oregon, United States. It is about 5 miles (8 km) northwest of Haines, west of U.S. Route 30.

Hutchinson was a station on the route of the Union Pacific Railroad's Huntington subdivision named for a local family. The line was originally owned by the Oregon Railroad and Navigation Company. Hutchinson post office was founded in 1900 with James H. Hutchinson as the first postmaster. The post office closed in 1902.
