= South Fork Burnt River =

- Location of the mouth of the South Fork Burnt River in Oregon
- Etymology: Either burned timber along its banks or burned-looking rocks along its course

Location
- Country: United States
- State: Oregon
- County: Baker

Physical characteristics
- Source: Blue Mountains
  - location: Monument Rock Wilderness, Wallowa–Whitman National Forest
  - coordinates: 44°20′35″N 118°23′40″W
  - elevation: 6,825 ft (2,080 m)
- Mouth: Burnt River
  - location: Unity Reservoir, north of Unity
  - coordinates: 44°29′23″N 118°12′04″W
  - elevation: 3,825 ft (1,166 m)
- Length: 12 mi (19 km)

The South Fork Burnt River is a tributary of the Burnt River in Baker County in the U.S. state of Oregon. Its headwaters lie in the Monument Rock Wilderness and the Wallowa–Whitman National Forest of the Blue Mountains. It flows generally northeast for about to meet the main stem at Unity Reservoir, north of Unity. The river, about 12 miles (19 km) long, crosses under U.S. Route 26 about 3 miles (5 km) northwest of Unity.

== Recreation ==
The spring-fed river, with steady flow and cool temperatures, supports a healthy population of rainbow trout. Trout fishing is generally good along the main stem of the South Fork as well as on Elk Creek, a tributary, and Last Chance Creek, a tributary of Elk Creek.

The South Fork Campground, along the creek 7 miles (11 km) from Unity, has 12 sites for tents or trailers and 2 sites for tents only. The campground is along Forest Road 6005 near the confluence of Rail Gulch and the South Fork. Amenities include vault toilets and picnic tables.

Further upstream is Stevens Campground, along Forest Road 6005 about 8 miles (13 km) from Unity, with seven sites for tents. Amenities include picnic tables and toilets.

Also along the South Fork is the Elk Creek Campground, about 9 miles (14 km) from Unity. It has 10 campsites along Forest Road 6005 near the confluence of Elk Creek with the South Fork. Amenities include vault toilets and picnic sites.

The Blue Mountain/South Fork OHV trails are a 56-mile (90 km) complex of trails for hikers, bikers, and horse riders, as well as OHVs up to 50 inches (130 cm) wide. The south end of the South Fork OHV trail is near South Fork Campground. The trail system extends north toward Sumpter.

== Tributaries ==
Listed from source to mouth, the named tributaries of the South Fork Burnt River are Lookout Creek, which enters from the left; Bear Creek, right; Spring and Elk creeks and Rail Gulch, left; Stevens, Barney, and Amelia creeks, right; Steep Creek, left; Bullrun Creek, right, and Pole Creek and Powell Gulch, both from the left.

== See also ==
- List of rivers of Oregon
