= Krag Peak =

Mountain peak in Oregon, United States

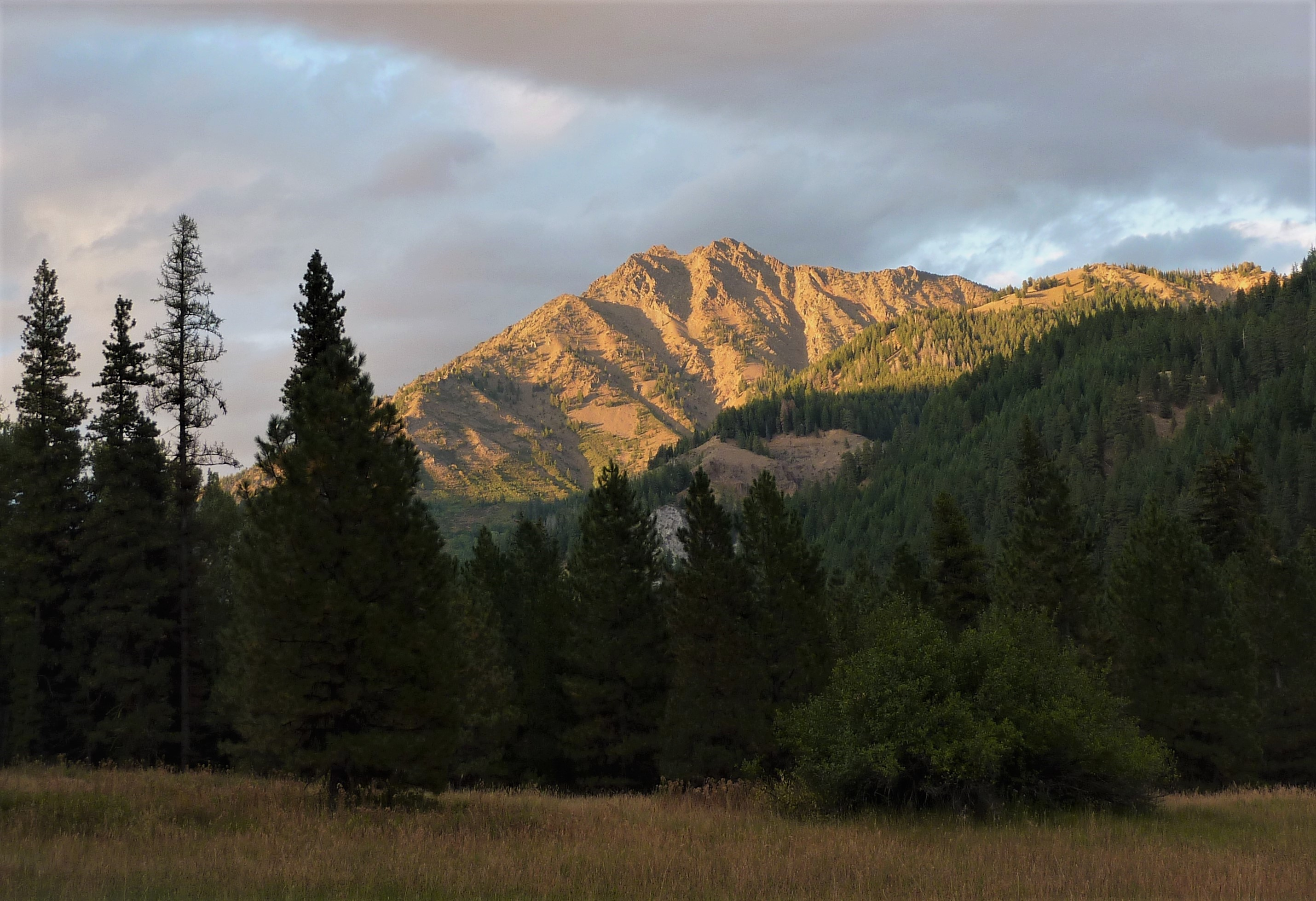
- South aspect

Highest point
- Elevation: 9,079 ft (2,767 m)
- Prominence: 1,240 ft (378 m)
- Parent peak: Red Mountain (9,537 ft)
- Isolation: 2.12 mi (3.41 km)
- Coordinates: 45°03′55″N 117°17′21″W

Geography
- Location within Oregon Location within the United States
- Location: Eagle Cap Wilderness
- Country: United States of America
- State: Oregon
- County: Baker
- Parent range: Wallowa Mountains
- Topo map: USGS Krag Peak

Climbing
- Easiest route: scrambling

Krag Peak is a mountain summit located in Baker County, Oregon, US.

== Description ==
Krag Peak is located in the southern Wallowa Mountains. The double summit peak is situated within the Eagle Cap Wilderness on land managed by Wallowa–Whitman National Forest. The 9,079-foot elevation (2,767 m) summit and slightly lower northwest peak (9,048 ft) ranks as the 42nd-highest mountain in Oregon, and third-highest in Baker County following Red Mountain and Rock Creek Butte. It ranks tied for 27th-highest in Oregon when 500-foot minimum topographic prominence is included as criteria. Precipitation runoff from the mountain drains west into East Fork Eagle Creek, and east to the Imnaha River via Cliff Creek. Topographic relief is significant as the summit rises nearly 4,500 feet (1,400 meters) above East Fork Eagle Creek in approximately one mile. This landform's toponym has been officially adopted by the United States Board on Geographic Names.

== Climate ==
Based on the Köppen climate classification, Krag Peak is located in a subarctic climate zone characterized by long, usually very cold winters, and mild summers. Winter temperatures can drop below −10 °F with wind chill factors below −20 °F. Most precipitation in the area is caused by orographic lift. Thunderstorms are common in the summer.

== See also ==
- List of mountain peaks of Oregon

== Gallery ==
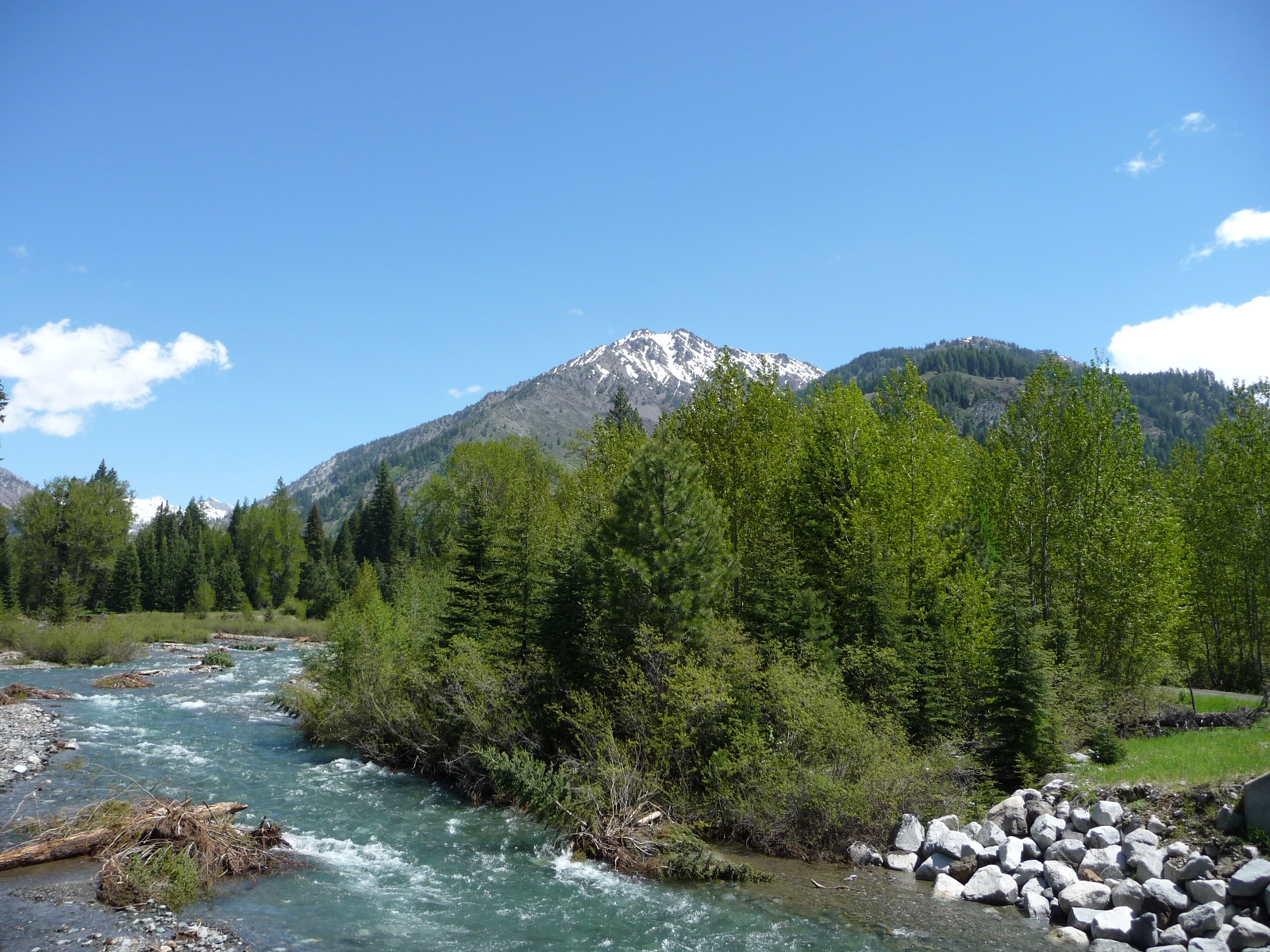
South aspect of Krag Peak with Eagle Creek

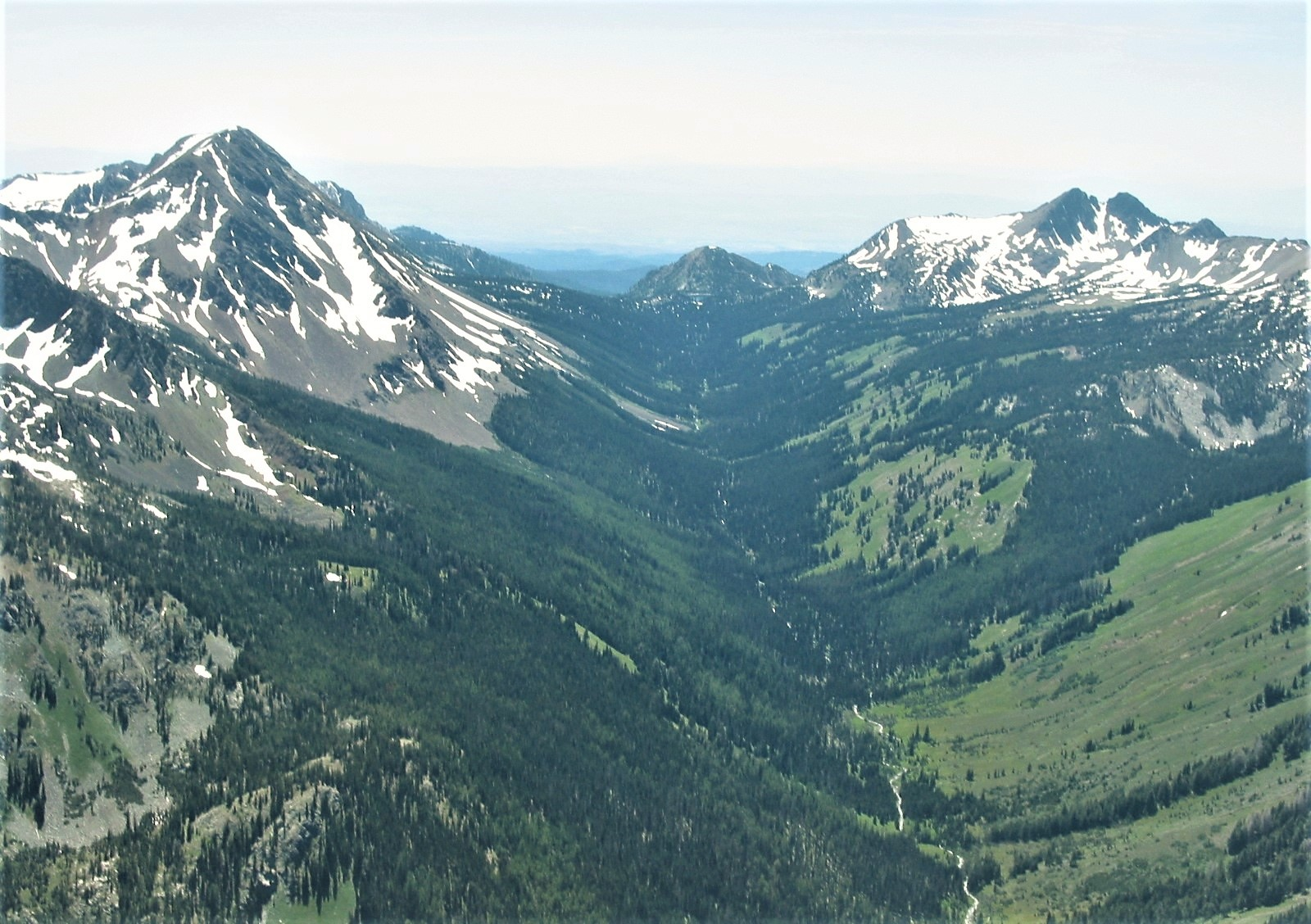
North aspects of Red Mountain (left) and Krag Peak (right).
Cliff Creek valley centered

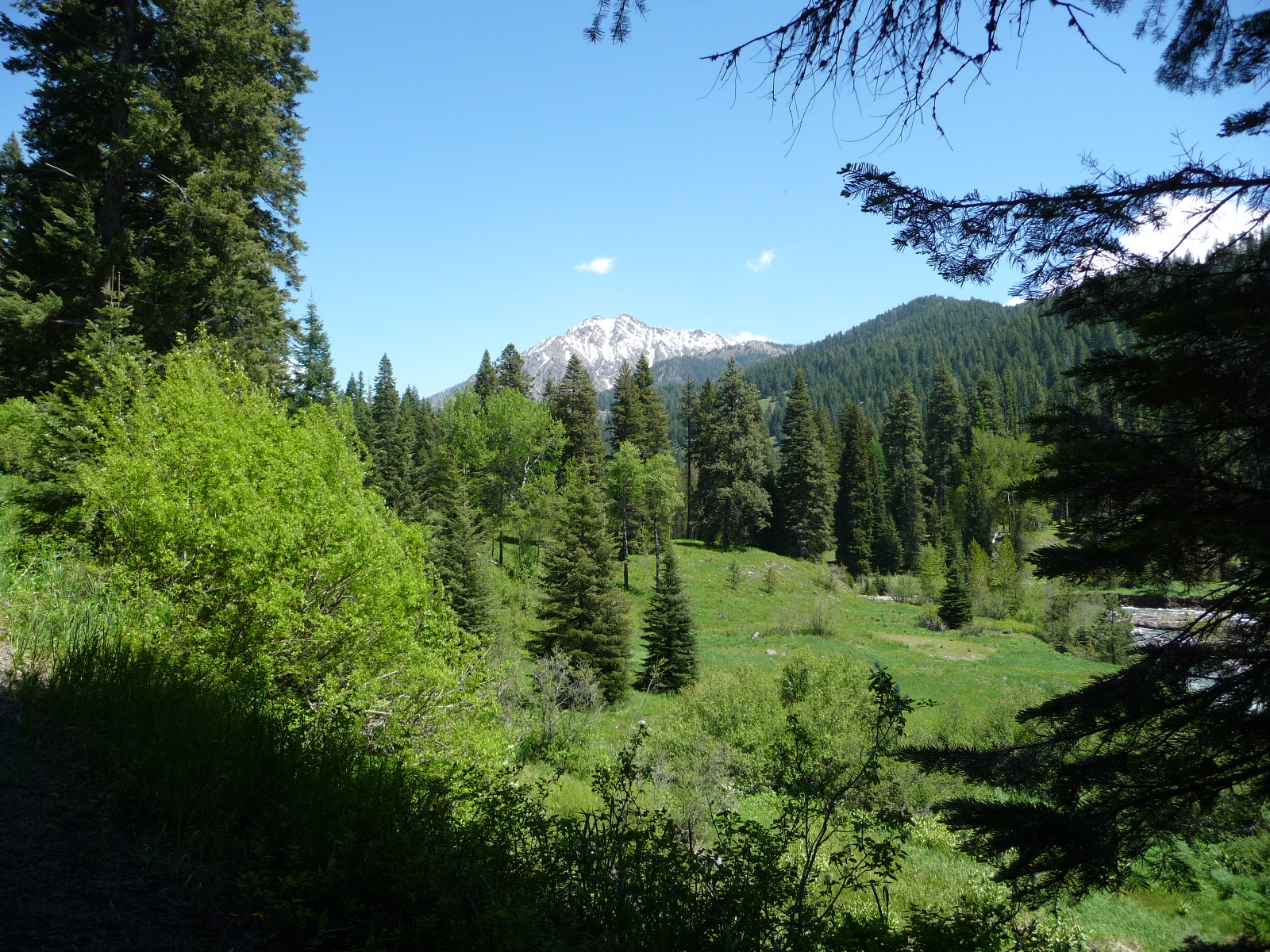
Krag Peak in the distance
