= Burnt River (Oregon) =

River in Oregon, United States

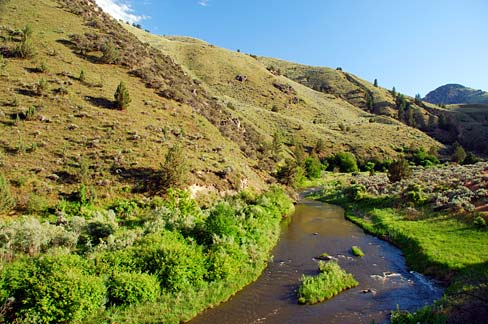
- Flowing through Burnt River Canyon

- Location in the United States Location of the mouth in Oregon
- Etymology: Either burned timber along its banks or burned-looking rocks along its course

Location
- Country: United States
- State: Oregon
- County: Baker

Physical characteristics
- Source: Blue Mountains
  - location: near Unity, Oregon
  - coordinates: 44°30′15″N 118°10′51″W
  - elevation: 3,824 ft (1,166 m)
- Mouth: Snake River
  - location: near Huntington, Oregon
  - coordinates: 44°21′54″N 117°13′34″W
  - elevation: 2,073 ft (632 m)
- Length: 98 mi (158 km)
- Basin size: 1,090 sq mi (2,800 km^{2})
- Discharge
  - average: 131 cu ft/s (3.7 m^{3}/s)

The Burnt River is a 98-mile-long (158 km) tributary of the Snake River in eastern Oregon, United States. It enters the Snake near Huntington at a point upstream of the Powder River and downstream of the Malheur River, slightly more than 327 miles (526 km) from the Snake's confluence with the Columbia River. Draining 1,090 square miles (2,800 km^{2}), it flows predominantly west to east.

The river begins at Unity Reservoir at the confluence of the North, West, Middle, and South forks of the river. The reservoir is slightly east of the Wallowa-Whitman National Forest in the Blue Mountains and slightly north of Unity. Unity Lake State Recreation Site adjoins the reservoir. As it leaves the lake, the river flows under Oregon Route 245, then runs east through the upper Burnt River Valley past Hereford and Bridgeport and, through the Burnt River Canyon, to Durkee. Turning generally southeast at Durkee, the river runs along Interstate 84 past Weatherby, Dixie, and Lime before flowing under the Interstate and turning east again. Shortly thereafter, it passes Huntington and reaches the Snake.

== See also ==
- List of rivers of Oregon
- List of longest streams of Oregon
