= Mason Dam =

Dam in Baker County, Oregon, United States

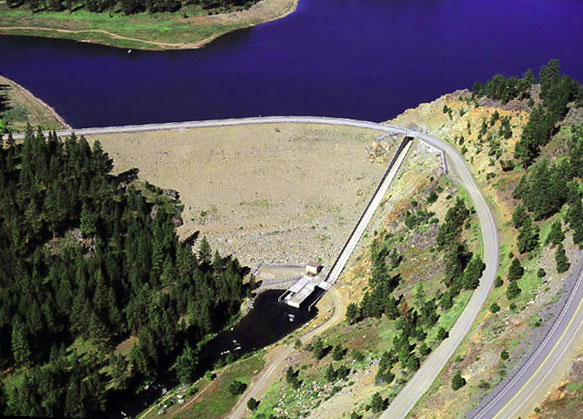
- Interactive map of Mason Dam
- Location: Baker County, Oregon
- Coordinates: 44°40′21″N 118°0′0″W

Mason Dam is a dam near Baker City, Oregon, in Baker County, of the north-eastern part of the state.

Mason Dam is a water conservation project of the United States Bureau of Reclamation, an earthen and rockfill dam originally constructed from 1965 through 1968. Owned by the Bureau, it is operated by the local Baker Valley Irrigation District. The nearby Thief Valley Reservoir from 1932 is part of the same Baker Project.

The dam is 167 feet (51 m) high, and the reservoir has a capacity of 114,000 acre-feet (141,000,000 m^{3}). It impounds the water of the Powder River to create Phillips Reservoir, which covers 2,235 acres (904 ha) and offers recreational fishing, boating, camping, etc. The lake is surrounded by the Wallowa–Whitman National Forest.

Baker County is in the process of adding a hydroelectric power plant at the dam which would sell power to Idaho Power through a nearby 138 kilovolt transmission line

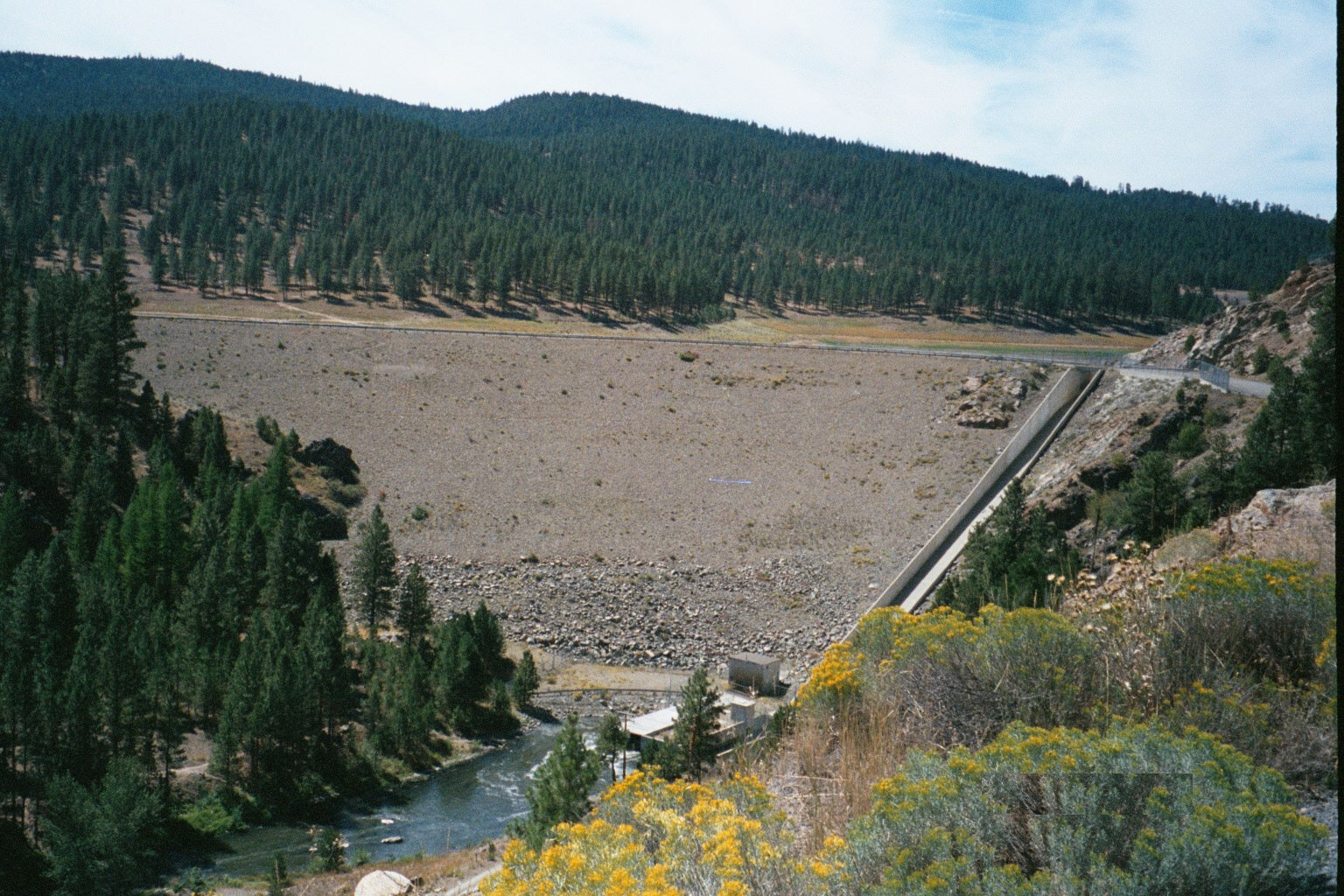
Taken from Oregon Route 7.

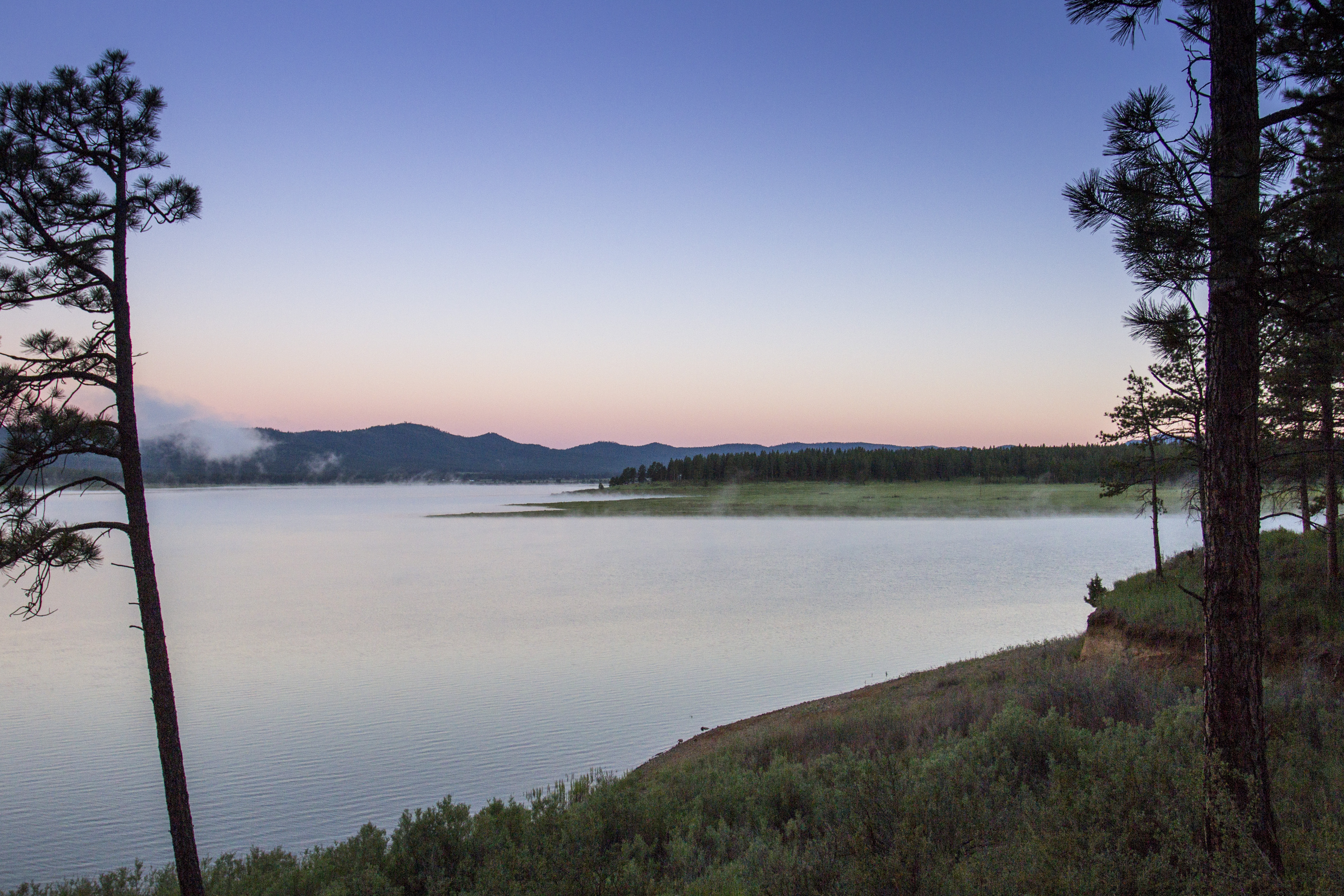
Phillips Lake (reservoir)

== See also ==
- List of lakes in Oregon
