= Huntington School =

Huntington School may refer to:

- Huntington School, York
- Huntington School (Oregon)
- Huntington School, a former Boston boys' school that is now part of the Chapel Hill – Chauncy Hall School
