= James O. Maxwell Farmstead =

- Maxwell, James O., Farmstead
- U.S. National Register of Historic Places
- Location within Oregon Location within the United States
- Nearest city: Haines, Oregon
- Coordinates: 44°56′17″N 117°59′34″W
- Area: 3.7 acres (1.5 ha)
- Built: 1880
- Architectural style: Late Victorian
- NRHP reference No.: 86003086
- Added to NRHP: November 06, 1986

The James O. Maxwell Farmstead, located in Haines, Oregon, is listed on the National Register of Historic Places.

== See also ==
- National Register of Historic Places listings in Baker County, Oregon
