= North Powder River =

- Location of the mouth of the North Powder River in Oregon

Location
- Country: United States
- State: Oregon
- County: Union and Baker

Physical characteristics
- Source: Blue Mountains
  - location: Wallowa–Whitman National Forest
  - coordinates: 44°52′15″N 118°12′14″W
  - elevation: 7,627 ft (2,325 m)
- Mouth: Powder River
  - location: North Powder, Oregon
  - coordinates: 45°02′19″N 117°53′44″W
  - elevation: 3,205 ft (977 m)
- Length: 25 mi (40 km)
- Basin size: 118 sq mi (310 km^{2})
- Discharge
  - average: 90 cu ft/s (2.5 m^{3}/s)

National Wild and Scenic River
- Type: Scenic
- Designated: October 28, 1988

The North Powder River is a 25-mile (40 km) tributary of the Powder River in the northeastern part of the U.S. state of Oregon. Fed by water from three small, high-elevation lakes, it begins in the Elkhorn Mountains, a sub-range of the Blue Mountains of the Pacific Northwest. From there it flows generally east to meet the larger river near the city of North Powder.

In 1988, the upper 6.4 miles (10.3 km) of the river, from the headwaters to the eastern boundary of the Wallowa–Whitman National Forest was named part of the National Wild and Scenic Rivers System. About 30 miles (48 km) from Baker City, the scenic upper river flows through rugged territory. Access by vehicle is limited to high-clearance types that use mainly the North Powder River Trail via Forest Road 7301. Although the upper river flows through old-growth forests and supports a population of wild rainbow trout, the lower river "mostly disappears in hayfield diversions."

The lower river forms the border between Union County on the north and Baker County on the south. Slightly upstream of North Powder, the river passes under Interstate 84.

== Tributaries ==
Named tributaries of the North Powder River from source to mouth are Horse Creek, North Fork North Powder River, Twin Mountain Creek, and Jimmy Creek. Then come Lawrence, Dutch Flat, Antone, and Little Antone creeks followed by Gorham Gulch. Entering the lower reaches are Anthony and Pilcher creeks.

== See also ==
- List of rivers of Oregon
- List of National Wild and Scenic Rivers
