= Wingville, Oregon =

Unincorporated community in the state of Oregon, United States

- Unincorporated community
- Location within Oregon Location within the United States
- Coordinates: 44°50′23″N 117°55′18″W
- Country: United States
- State: Oregon
- County: Baker
- Elevation: 3,402 ft (1,037 m)
- Time zone: UTC-8 (Pacific (PST))
  - Summer (DST): UTC-7 (PDT)
- Area codes: 458 and 541
- GNIS feature ID: 1129233

Wingville is an unincorporated community in Baker County, Oregon, United States. Wingville lies at the intersection of Wingville Lane and Old Wingville Road northwest of Baker City and northeast of Pocahontas.

The community's name stemmed from a derisive term for former soldiers of the Confederate States Army who had served during the American Civil War under Sterling Price, a major general, and who later emigrated to Oregon. Sometimes collectively referred to as a wing of Price's army, a group of them settled in Baker County after the war.

Wingville had a post office from June 23, 1871, through July 1879. John R. McLain was the first postmaster.
