= Baker Municipal Natatorium =

- U.S. National Register of Historic Places
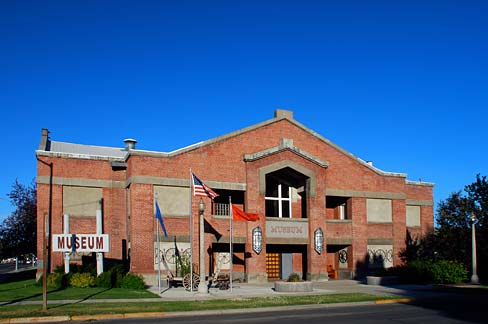

- Location within Oregon Location within the United States
- Location: 2470 Grove St., Baker, Oregon
- Coordinates: 44°46′54″N 117°49′27″W
- Area: 1.1 acres (0.45 ha)
- Built: 1920
- Architect: White, Michael P.
- NRHP reference No.: 77001097
- Added to NRHP: October 17, 1977

The Baker Municipal Natatorium, located in Baker City, Oregon, is listed on the National Register of Historic Places. Baker Heritage Museum, previously the Oregon Trail Regional Museum, is now housed in this building.

== See also ==
- National Register of Historic Places listings in Baker County, Oregon
