= Encina, Oregon =

Unincorporated community in the state of Oregon, United States

- Unincorporated community
- Location within Oregon Location within the United States
- Coordinates: 44°41′30″N 117°41′29″W
- Country: United States
- State: Oregon
- County: Baker
- Elevation: 3,963 ft (1,208 m)
- Time zone: UTC-8 (Pacific (PST))
  - Summer (DST): UTC-7 (PDT)
- Area codes: 458 and 541
- GNIS feature ID: 1116654

Encina is an unincorporated community in Baker County, Oregon, United States. Encina is about 10 miles (16 km) southeast of Baker City near exit 313 of U.S. Route 30/Interstate 84.

Encina is Spanish for "evergreen oak". The railroad siding of the Union Pacific Railroad mainline at this locale was named "Oak Cut" at the time of its construction, but the name was "cumbersome" so it was renamed by railroad agent J. C. Mayo, who had lived in Mexico. Encina is the place of Johnson Spring. Named for the first owner of what is now Alder Grove Ranch that sits on Alder Creek with water rights from 1883. The Johnson's are buried in Pleasant Valley Cemetery on Dry Creek Cutoff between Alder Creek Road and Dry Creek Road.

== Railway history ==
Encina is the summit of the Huntington Subdivision mainline. The tracks that go through Encina were originally owned by the Oregon Railway & Navigation Company that built the railroad from 1882 to 1884.
