= Superintendent's House (Sumpter, Oregon) =

Historic house in Oregon, United States

- U.S. National Register of Historic Places
- Location within Oregon Location within the United States
- Location: 271 Mill St., Sumpter, Oregon
- Coordinates: 44°44′39″N 118°12′6″W
- Area: 0.5 acres (0.20 ha)
- Built: 1903
- Architect: Sumpter Townsite Co. Ltd.
- Architectural style: Queen Anne, Stick/Eastlake
- NRHP reference No.: 04000879
- Added to NRHP: August 20, 2004

The Superintendent's House, also known as the Oliver C. and L. Mae Wright House, is a house located in Sumpter, Oregon listed on the National Register of Historic Places.

== See also ==
- National Register of Historic Places listings in Baker County, Oregon
