= Cornucopia Jailhouse =

Former jailhouse in Oregon, US

Coordinates: 45.0070°N 117.1968°W

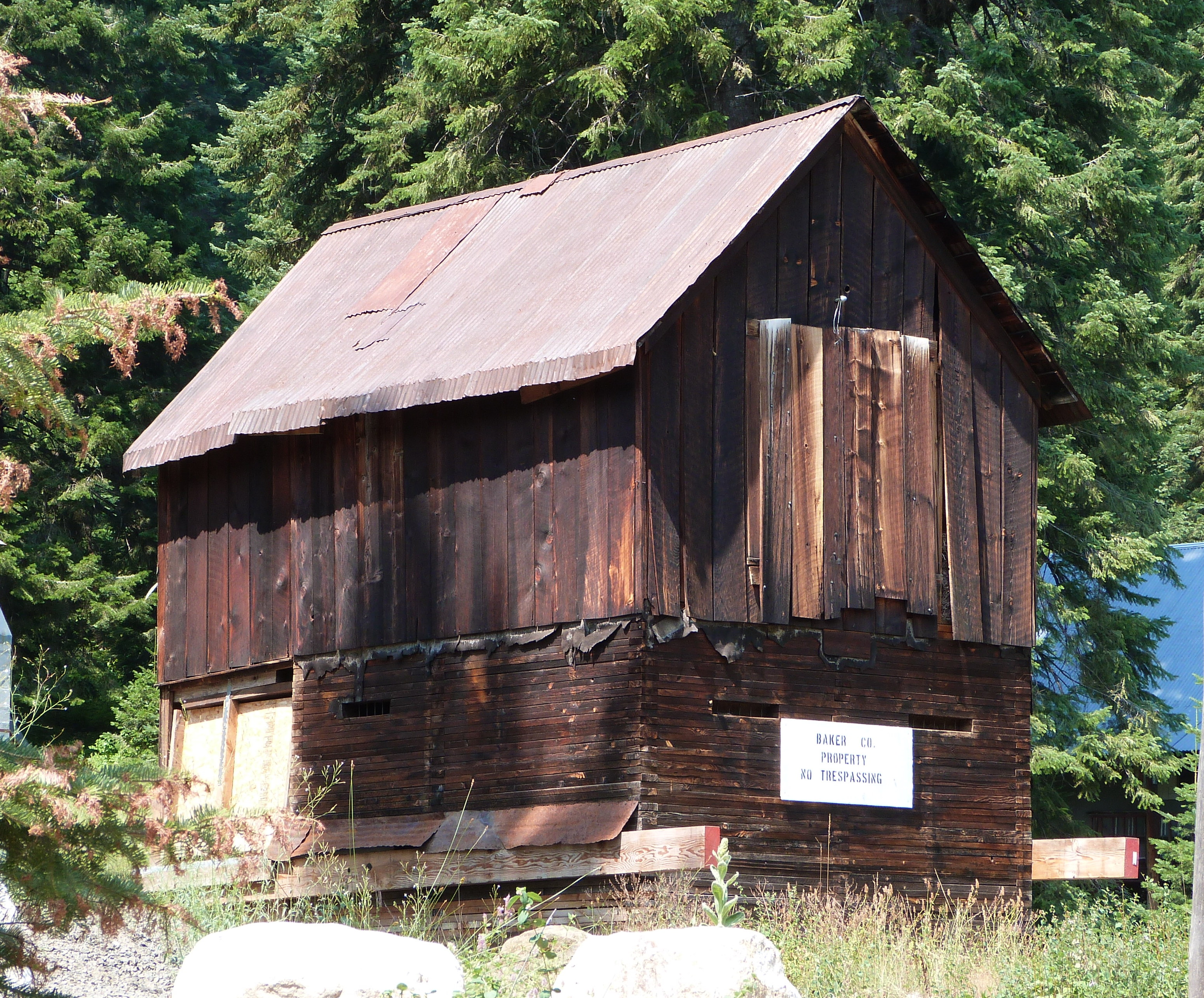
The building's exterior in 2014

The Cornucopia Jailhouse is a former jailhouse located on Second Street in the ghost town of Cornucopia, Oregon. The building was added to the National Register of Historic Places on November 24, 2014.

== See also ==
- National Register of Historic Places listings in Baker County, Oregon
