= Churchill School (Baker City, Oregon) =

- U.S. National Register of Historic Places
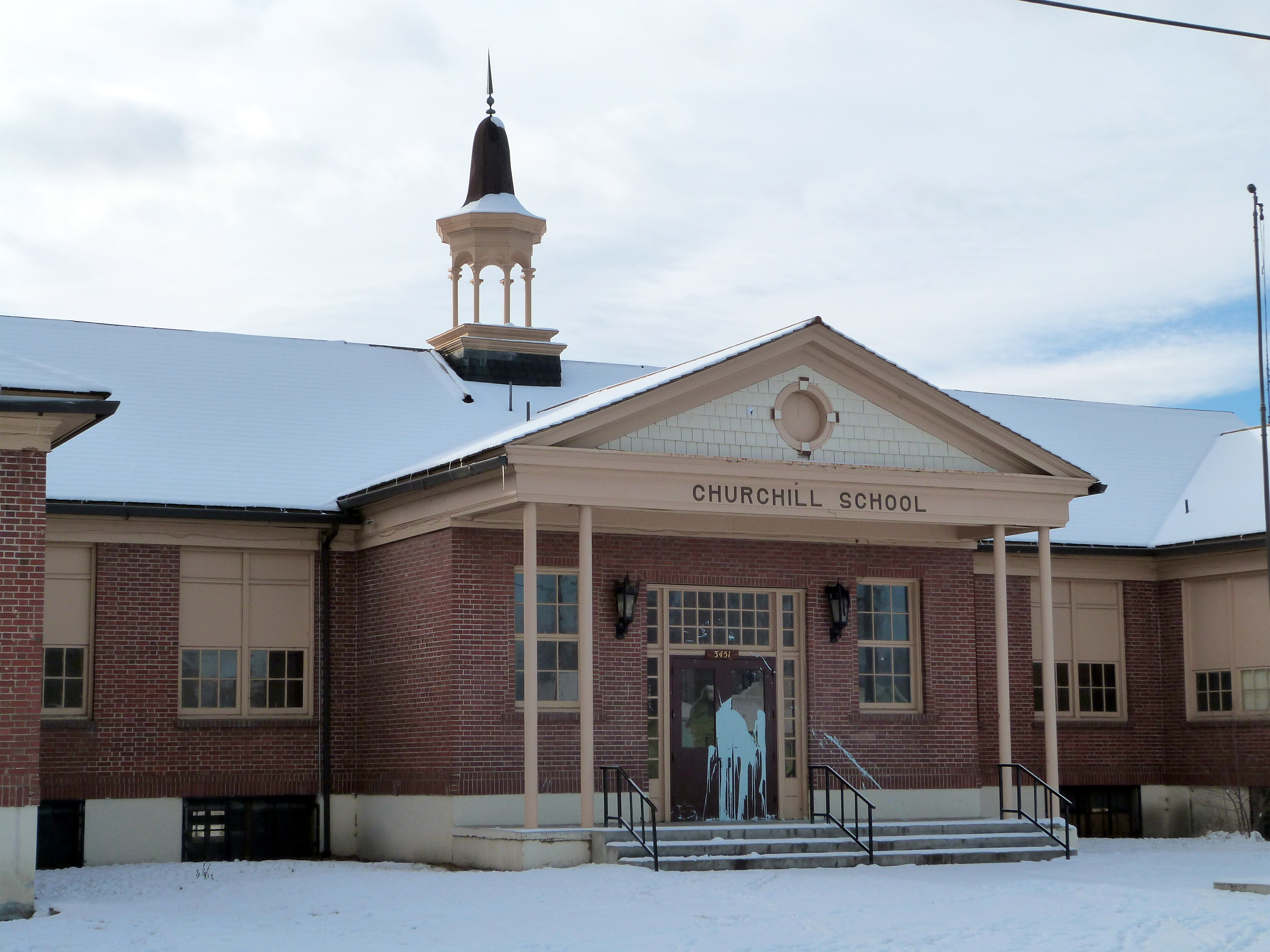

- Location within Oregon Location within the United States
- Location: 3451 Broadway, Baker City, Oregon
- Coordinates: 44.777748°N 117.849270°W
- Area: 1.2 acres (0.49 ha)
- Built: 1926
- Architect: Miller, Charles Benjamin
- Architectural style: Classical Revival
- NRHP reference No.: 08000182
- Added to NRHP: March 5, 2008

The Churchill School, located in Baker City, Oregon, is a former public school listed on the National Register of Historic Places.

== See also ==
- National Register of Historic Places listings in Baker County, Oregon
