= Auburn, Oregon =

- Former unincorporated community
- Location within Oregon Location within the United States
- Coordinates: 44°41′58″N 117°56′43″W
- Country: United States
- State: Oregon
- County: Baker
- Elevation: 4,213 ft (1,284 m)
- Time zone: UTC-8 (Pacific (PST))
  - Summer (DST): UTC-7 (PDT)
- Area codes: 458 and 541
- GNIS feature ID: 1136017

Auburn is a ghost town in rural Baker County, Oregon, United States. Auburn lies off Oregon Route 7 southwest of Baker City and east of McEwen on the edge of the Blue Mountains.

Auburn is deserted today, but the former gold mining boomtown was once the largest community in Eastern Oregon. Auburn only had one or two buildings until 1861, when gold was discovered in the area. By September 1862, Auburn had grown into a full-fledged town with over 20 stores and 1000 homes to serve the mining industry. In that month the Oregon Legislative Assembly made Auburn the first county seat of Baker County, but by the 1870s Auburn was largely deserted, with a population of 200 people in 1873.

The post office, the first in northeast Oregon, closed in 1903. It had opened on November 1, 1862, with William F. McCrary as the first postmaster.

== See also ==
- List of ghost towns in Oregon
