= Pleasant Valley, Baker County, Oregon =

Unincorporated community in the state of Oregon, United States

Pleasant Valley, Oregon
- Unincorporated community
- Location within Oregon Location within the United States
- Coordinates: 44°40′28″N 117°37′50″W
- Country: United States
- State: Oregon
- County: Baker
- Elevation: 3,757 ft (1,145 m)
- Time zone: UTC-8 (Pacific (PST))
  - Summer (DST): UTC-7 (PDT)
- Area codes: 458 and 541
- GNIS feature ID: 1125477

Pleasant Valley is an unincorporated community in Baker County, Oregon, United States. It is about 13 miles (21 km) southeast of Baker City on U.S. Route 30, slightly bypassed by Interstate 84.

== History ==
Pleasant Valley was a way station on the Place Toll Road in 1865, and later a freight station on the railroad in 1884. Early Oregon Trail settlers farmed in the area. Pleasant Valley post office was established in 1868 and operated for only two months. An office with the same name was established in 1890 and closed in 1962. According to the authors of Oregon Geographic Names, the community later consisted only of a motel and a Union Pacific Railroad station. By 2001, the motel had been converted into a residence.

The Pleasant Valley area is the home of several stone quarries that supplied the tuff stone commonly used for building material in Baker City. At one time Pleasant Valley was a community with enough population and settled arable land surrounding it to warrant a school district. School District #12 was organized by superintendent W. F. Payton in 1874, with a two-room school house serving grades 1 through 8. The district added classes for high-school-age students for a few years before consolidating with the Baker City school district in 1949. The third and last schoolhouse was constructed of the nearby native stone and was later converted to a residence. In 1900, the community had a Christian Church congregation. Today the community proper is considered a ghost town, however the Geographic Names Information System (GNIS) lists it as a populated place.
