= Eagle Creek (Powder River tributary) =

- Location of the mouth of Eagle Creek in Oregon

Location
- Country: United States
- State: Oregon
- County: Union County, Baker County

Physical characteristics
- Source: Eagle Lake
  - location: Eagle Cap Wilderness, Wallowa Mountains, Union County
  - coordinates: 45°07′30″N 117°20′19″W
  - elevation: 7,847 ft (2,392 m)
- Mouth: Powder River
  - location: near Richland, Baker County
  - coordinates: 44°44′45″N 117°10′21″W
  - elevation: 2,106 ft (642 m)
- Length: 41 mi (66 km)
- Basin size: 196 sq mi (510 km^{2})
- Discharge
  - average: 316 cu ft/s (8.9 m^{3}/s)

National Wild and Scenic Rivers System
- Type: Wild, Scenic, Recreational
- Designated: October 28, 1988

Eagle Creek is a tributary, 41 miles (66 km) long, of the Powder River in the northeastern part of the U.S. state of Oregon. Beginning at Eagle Lake in the Wallowa Mountains, the creek flows generally southwest and then southeast to meet the river near the small city of Richland. The creek's headwaters are in the Eagle Cap Wilderness within the Wallowa–Whitman National Forest. The upper 28.9 miles (46.5 km) of the creek, from Eagle Lake to the national forest boundary at Skull Creek, are part of the National Wild and Scenic Rivers System.

== Recreation ==
=== Camping and hiking ===
The Main Eagle Trailhead, adjacent to the creek near its confluence with Boulder Creek, provides access to an extensive system of trails for hiking and horse riding in the wilderness. It is at the north end of Forest Road 7755, about 45 miles (72 km) north of Baker City. Amenities include parking, an interpretive site, and a vault toilet.

Along Forest Road 7755 slightly downstream of the Main Eagle Trailhead is the Boulder Park Campground with seven sites for tent or trailer camping. Amenities include picnic tables, a vault toilet, and a loading ramp and bunk feeder for pack and riding animals. Water for the animals is available from the creek.

Two Color Campground, 3 miles (5 km) downstream of the Main Eagle Trailhead and near the confluence with Two Color Creek, has 11 sites for tent and trailer camping, picnic tables, and vault toilets. Near the campground is the Two Color Guard Station, a rental cabin with accommodations for up to 12 people. Amenities include parking, a vault toilet, propane lights, a cook stove and oven, a propane heater, and a horse corral. No smoking or pets are allowed inside the cabin. The site has no water for drinking, cooking, or washing.

Tamarack Campground, near the confluence of Eagle Creek with West Eagle Creek, is along Forest Road 77. It has room for 12 tents or small trailers; amenities include toilets, picnic tables, and drinking water.

Eagle Fork Campground, along Forest Road 7735, is near the confluence of Eagle Creek with Little Eagle Creek. With room for seven tents or trailers, it has amenities including picnic tables, toilets, and drinking water. The campground is adjacent to the Eagle Forks Trailhead, with access to Martin Bridge Trail along the creek.

=== Fishing ===
Eagle Creek supports a population of wild as well as stocked rainbow trout up to 12 inches (30 cm) long. Anglers can reach the lower river by road and the upper river along trails.

== Tributaries ==
Named tributaries of Eagle Creek from source to mouth are Cached Creek and Bench Canyon, then Copper, Boulder, Little Boulder, Two Color, West Eagle, and Skookum creeks, followed by Excelsior Gulch. Then Dixie, Bennet, O'Brien, Bradley, and East Fork Eagle creeks, followed by Blue Canyon and Twilight Gulch.

Further downstream come Paddy Creek and Empire Gulch followed by Basin, Dempsey, Puzzle, and Shanghai creeks. Then Six Dollar Gulch and Holcolmb, Little Eagle, and Trouble creeks, followed by Town Gulch. Then Skull, Barnard, and Summit creeks.

== See also ==
- List of rivers of Oregon
