= Thief Valley Reservoir =

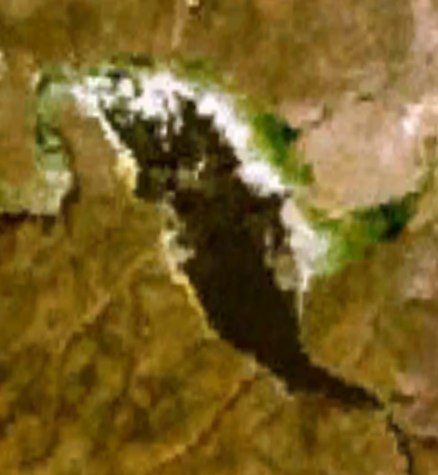
- Satellite image

- Location within Oregon Location within the United States
- Location: Baker / Union counties, Eastern Oregon, United States
- Coordinates: 45°01′32″N 117°47′57″W
- Type: Reservoir
- Primary inflows: Powder River
- Primary outflows: Powder River
- Basin countries: United States
- Managing agency: United States Bureau of Reclamation
- Built: 1932
- Surface area: 740 acres (300 ha)
- Water volume: 17,600 acre⋅ft (21,700,000 m^{3})
- Surface elevation: c. 3,000 ft (910 m)

Thief Valley Reservoir is a large reservoir on the Powder River in Eastern Oregon, United States. Primarily used for irrigation purposes, it lies at an elevation of approximately 3,000 feet (910 m), covers an area of 740 acres (300 ha), and impounds 17,600 acre-feet (21,700,000 m^{3}). It provides good angling opportunities for rainbow trout in years of high water.

The reservoir was created in 1932 by the Thief Valley Dam, a project of the United States Bureau of Reclamation. The dam is a concrete-slab-and-buttress Ambursen structure, 73 feet (22 m) high and 390 feet (120 m) long. The dam was designed by Frank A. Banks.

== See also ==
- List of lakes in Oregon
