= Bridgeport, Baker County, Oregon =

Unincorporated community in the state of Oregon, United States

Bridgeport, Oregon
- Unincorporated community
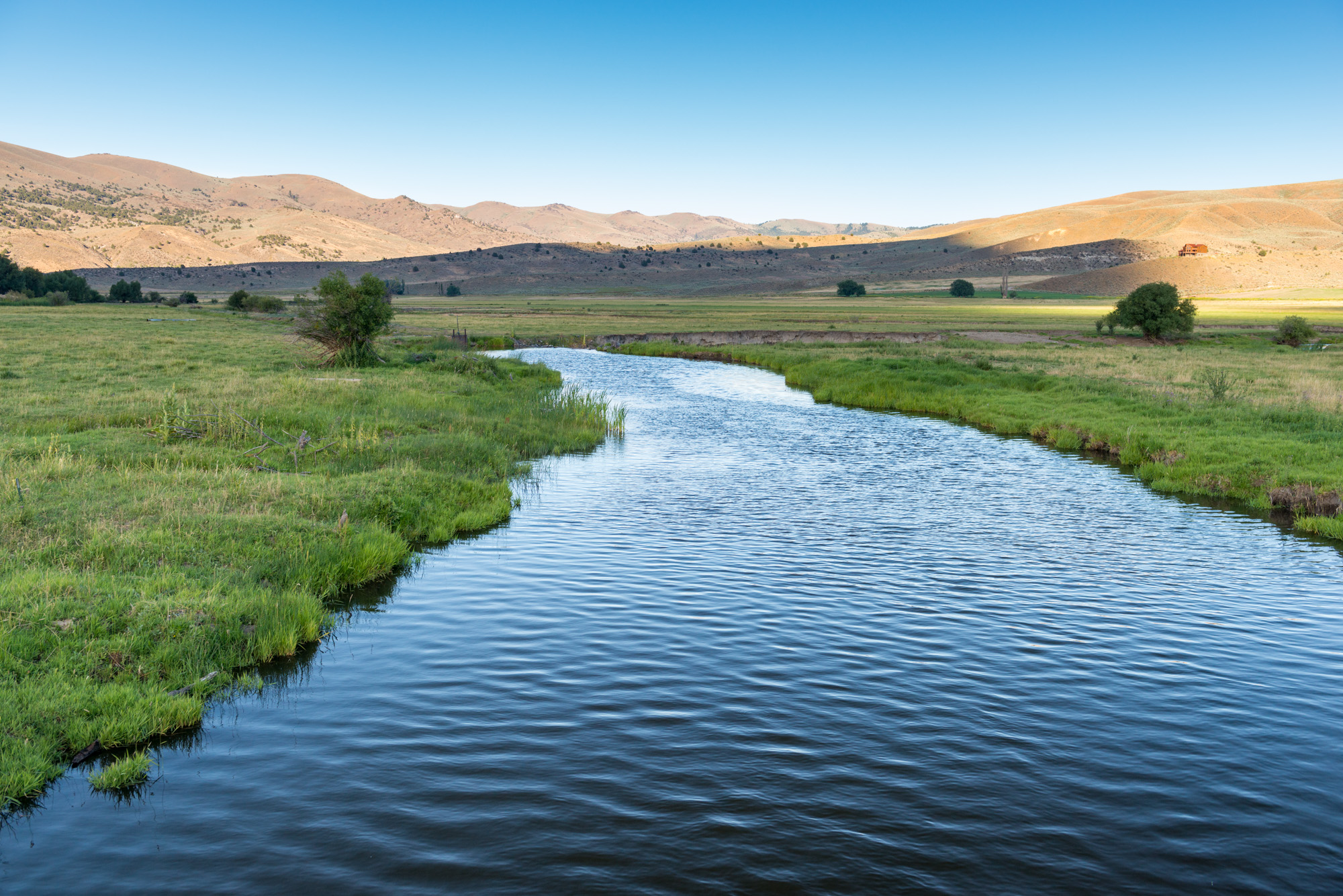
- The Burnt River at Bridgeport

- Location within Oregon Location within the United States
- Coordinates: 44°29′09″N 117°44′43″W
- Country: United States
- State: Oregon
- County: Baker
- Elevation: 3,389 ft (1,033 m)
- Time zone: UTC-8 (Pacific (PST))
  - Summer (DST): UTC-7 (PDT)
- ZIP code: 97819
- Area codes: 458 and 541
- GNIS feature ID: 1161286

Bridgeport is an unincorporated community in Baker County, Oregon, United States. Bridgeport is south of Baker City and just east of Oregon Route 245. The Burnt River flows by Bridgeport.

== From Oregon Geographic Names ==
"C.A. Moore, of Baker, in a letter in the Oregonian, Aug. 7, 1926, p.8, gives the early history of this community. In 1961-63 considerable placer gold was discovered at Clark Creek, several miles southeast of Bridgeport. Supplies were packed from Baker over the old Creighton road, crossing Burnt River near where Hereford now is, and then down the river on the south side to these mines, where there were some stores and a post office. Bridgeport is on the south bank of the river, which could not then be forded. The need for a wagon road and a shorter route to Clark Creek lead Dr. Jacob M. Boyd and James W. Virtue and associates, in 1868, to begin the construction of a toll road from Baker to what is now Bridgeport, and in 1869 this road was made passable for the entire distance. At the south end of the road, where it crossed the river, there was a bridge some 200 feet long, and since this was the terminus of the toll road, it was decided to call the place Bridgeport."
