= Robert F. and Elizabeth Clark House =

Historic house in Oregon, United States

- U.S. National Register of Historic Places
- Location within Oregon Location within the United States
- Location: 1522 Washington Ave., Baker, Oregon
- Coordinates: 44°46′38″N 117°49′22″W
- Area: 0.5 acres (0.20 ha)
- Built: 1880
- Architectural style: Italianate
- NRHP reference No.: 89001857
- Added to NRHP: October 30, 1989

The Robert F. and Elizabeth Clark House, located in Baker City, Oregon, is a house listed on the National Register of Historic Places.

== See also ==
- National Register of Historic Places listings in Baker County, Oregon
