= Unity Lake State Recreation Site =

State park in Oregon, United States

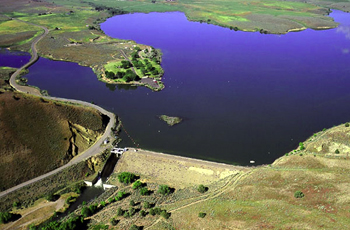
- Unity Dam and Unity Reservoir

- Location within Oregon Location within the United States
- Type: Public, state
- Location: Baker County, Oregon
- Nearest city: Baker City
- Coordinates: 44°29′56″N 118°11′14″W
- Operator: Oregon Parks and Recreation Department

Unity Lake State Recreation Site is a state park in the U.S. state of Oregon, administered by the Oregon Parks and Recreation Department.

Unity Dam was constructed in 1938 by the United States Bureau of Reclamation as an irrigation storage project. The 82-foot (25 m) earthen dam impounds the water of the Burnt River to create Unity Reservoir, originally with 27,000 acre-feet (33,000,000 m^{3}) of capacity. No hydroelectric power is generated here. The project is owned by the Bureau, and operated and maintained by the local Burnt River Irrigation District.

Facilities at the adjacent state park include cabins, camp sites, day-use parking and boat ramps.

== See also ==
- List of Oregon state parks
