= Ed Rand House =

Historic house in Oregon, United States

- U.S. National Register of Historic Places
- Location within Oregon Location within the United States
- Location: 1700 4th St., Baker, Oregon
- Coordinates: 44°46′30″N 117°49′59″W
- Area: less than one acre
- Built: 1909
- Architect: Rand, Ed
- Architectural style: Bungalow/Craftsman
- NRHP reference No.: 81000709
- Added to NRHP: December 9, 1981

The Ed Rand House, located in Baker City, Oregon, is a house listed on the National Register of Historic Places, designed by the architect Ed Rand.

== See also ==
- National Register of Historic Places listings in Baker County, Oregon
