= Oregon Commercial Company Building =

- Formerly listed on the U.S. National Register of Historic Places
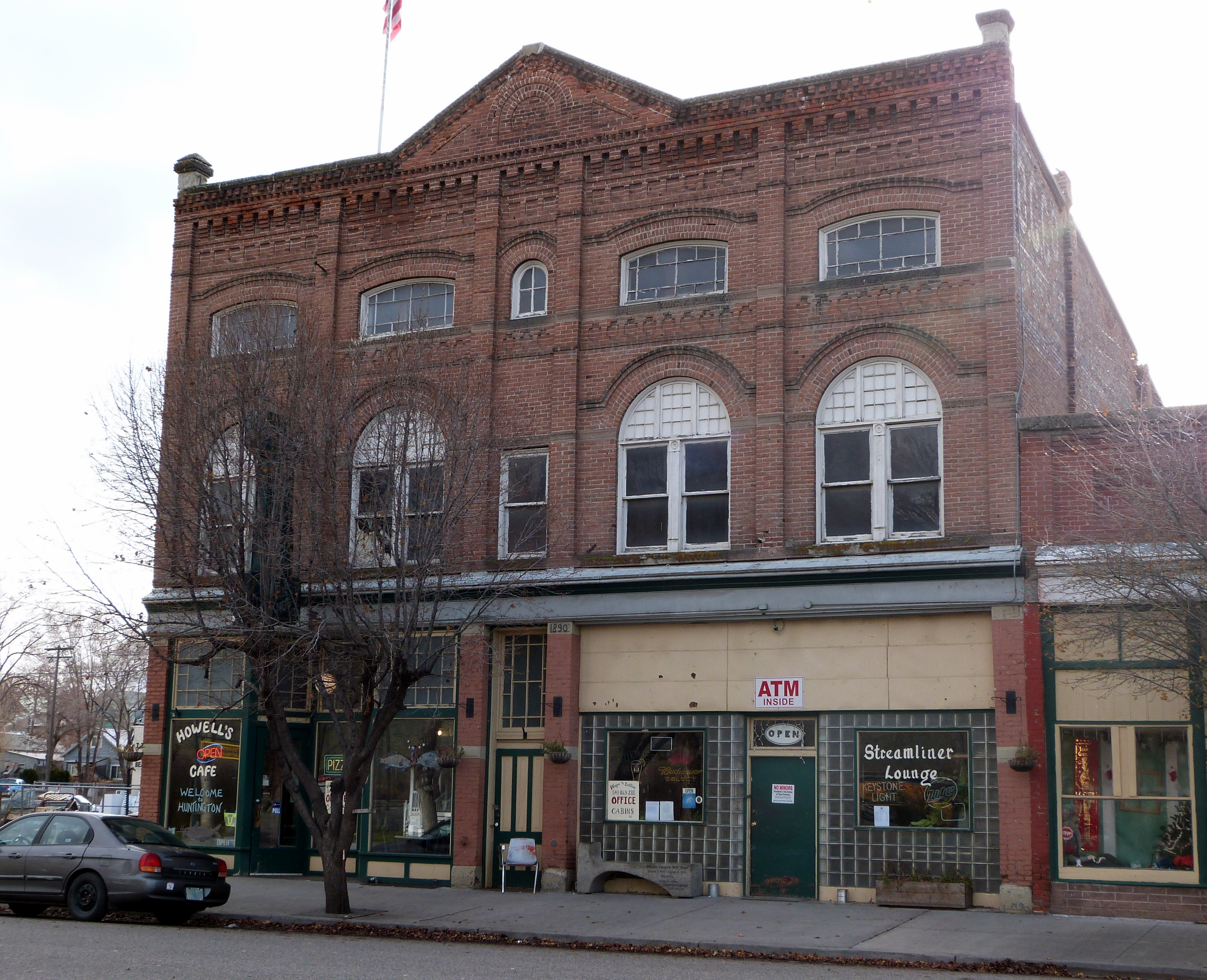

- Location within Oregon Location within the United States
- Location: 40--50 E. Washington St., Huntington, Oregon
- Coordinates: 44°21′5″N 117°15′59″W
- Area: 0.1 acres (0.040 ha)
- Built: 1891
- Architect: Steel, R.M.
- Architectural style: Italianate, High Victorian Italianate
- NRHP reference No.: 92000666

Significant dates
- Added to NRHP: June 04, 1992
- Removed from NRHP: June 17, 2025

The Oregon Commercial Company Building was a historic commercial building in Huntington, Baker County, Oregon, United States. It was built in 1890, and was added to the National Register of Historic Places in 1992.

According to the Statement of Significance in its application for appearance on the Register, the Oregon Commercial Company Building was "the best preserved, most dominant building remaining [in Huntington] that reflects the era of expansion associated with the economic impact of the railroad ... ". It was also described there as a "rare and prominent vestige of Huntington's heyday as a railroad town".

The building burned down on May 24, 2019.

== History ==
In the early 1880s, two subsidiaries of the Union Pacific Railroad were working to complete a single line that would connect Portland, Oregon and Omaha, Nebraska. Working from east to west was the Oregon Short Line; working in the opposite direction was the Oregon Railroad and Navigation Company. The two lines of track were connected in Huntington in November 1884. At this point, economic activity around the connection point increased, generally catering to the railroad, its workers and its passengers. Huntington became an incorporated town in 1891.

The Oregon Commercial Company Building was built by the Oregon Construction Company. Work on it started in 1890 and was completed the next year. The two-story building originally had its lower floor split between a drug store and a general store. Its upper floor was used as rental apartments, chiefly tenanted by railroad workers. It took on the name of the Oregon Commercial Company in 1894 when that company was founded by R. M. Steel and J. H. Aitkin. The name of both the company and the building changed to the Huntington Mercantile when the business was purchased in 1908 by Fred S. Bubb. The building was purchased by Howell (first name not known) in 1928 and, by 1930, the lower floor had been converted into a restaurant (Howell's Cafe) and a lounge (the Streamliner Lounge).

A corner of the building collapsed in 1991, but reconstruction efforts were begun the next year. In 2002, Howell's Cafe and the Streamliner Lounge were re-opened as part of an overall plan to revitalize downtown Huntington.

The building burned with a complete loss on May 24, 2019.
