= Red Mountain (Oregon) =

Mountain in Baker County, Oregon, United States

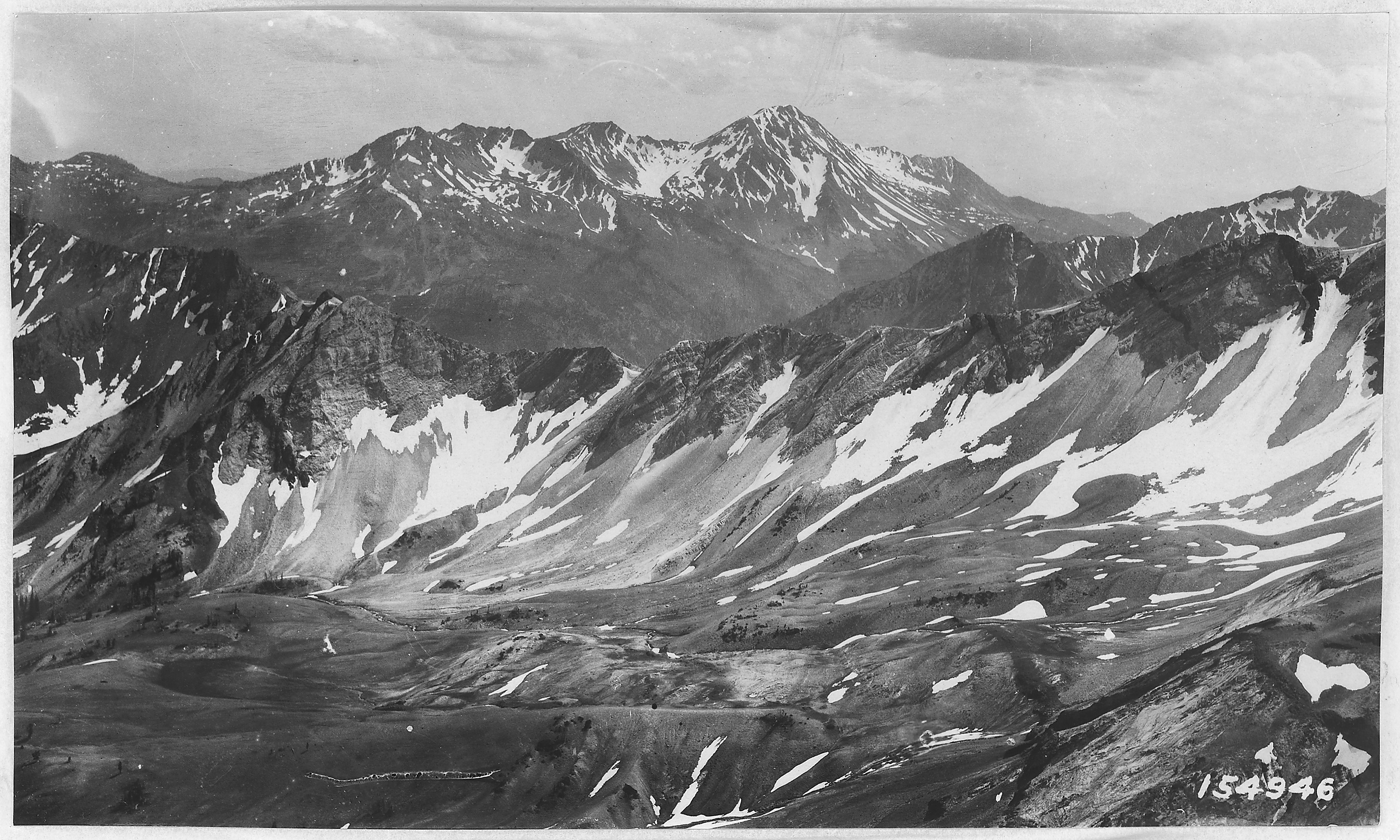
- North aspect of Red Mountain in the distance, seen from near Sentinel Peak

Highest point
- Elevation: 9,537 ft (2,907 m)
- Prominence: 1,960 ft (600 m)
- Parent peak: Eagle Cap
- Isolation: 7.34 mi (11.81 km)
- Coordinates: 45°03′52″N 117°14′47″W

Geography
- Location within Oregon
- Location: Baker County, Oregon

Red Mountain is a 9,537-foot (2,907 m) summit of the Wallowa Mountains in Baker County, Oregon, in the United States. It is located in the Eagle Cap Wilderness of the Wallowa National Forest.

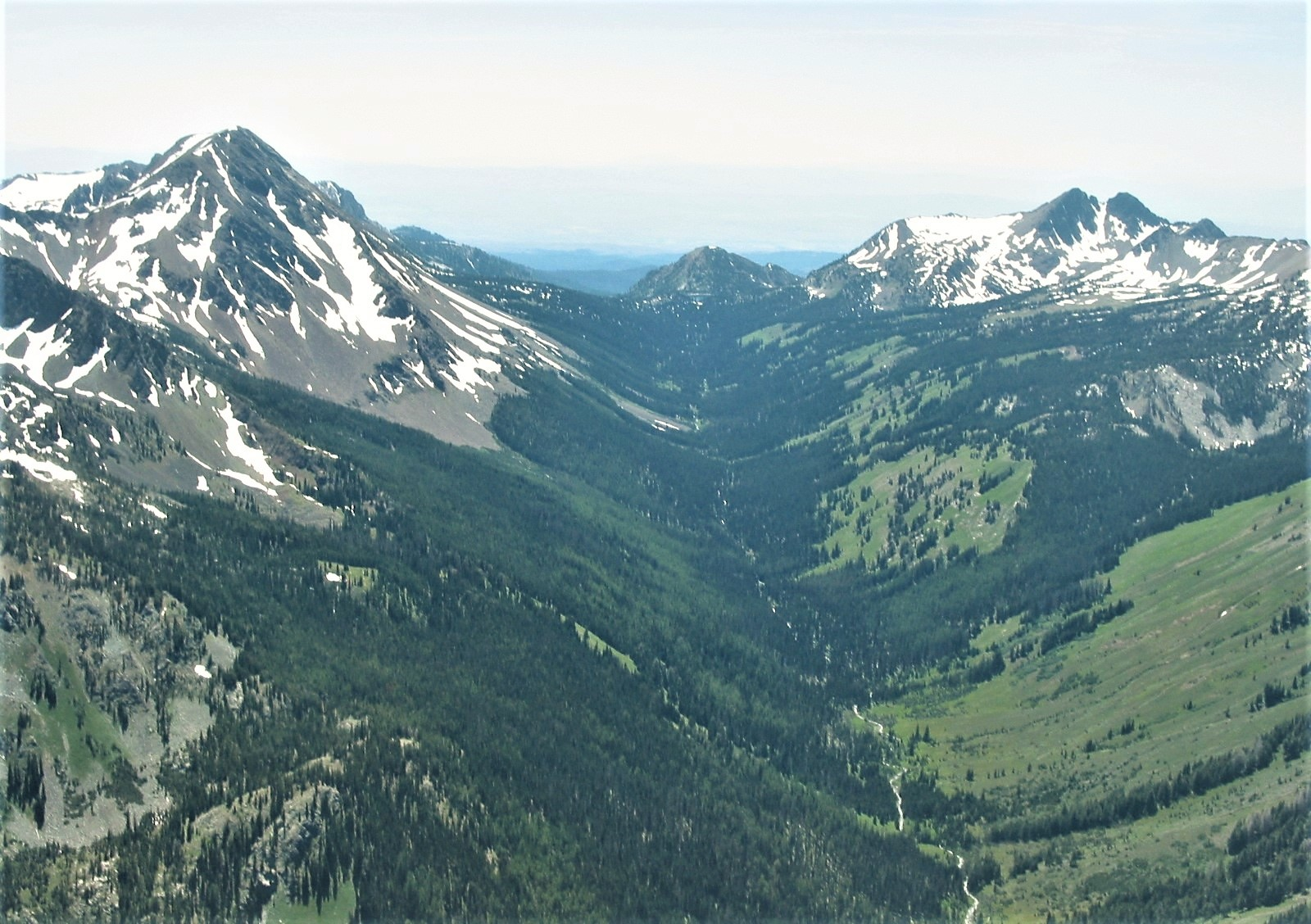
Cliff Creek valley, with Red Mountain (left) and Krag Peak (right)

== See also ==
- List of mountain peaks of Oregon
