= Weatherby, Oregon =

Unincorporated community in the state of Oregon, United States

- Unincorporated community
- Location within Oregon Location within the United States
- Coordinates: 44°29′55″N 117°22′17″W
- Country: United States
- State: Oregon
- County: Baker
- Elevation: 2,415 ft (736 m)
- Time zone: UTC-8 (Pacific (PST))
  - Summer (DST): UTC-7 (PDT)
- Area codes: 458 and 541
- GNIS feature ID: 1136882

Weatherby is an unincorporated community in Baker County, Oregon, United States. It is about 9 miles (14 km) southeast of Durkee on Interstate 84/U.S. Route 30, near the Burnt River.

There was a post office named Express Ranch established in 1865 near what is now Durkee during the gold mining boom in the county. C. W. Durkee was the first postmaster. It was so-named because it was a stopover for stagecoaches or "expresses", while the term "ranch" in this case probably came from the Spanish rancho, a term for a place of lodging popular with the miners who had gone there from California. It had nothing to do with the pursuit of ranching. The name of the office was changed to Weatherby in 1879 and at the same time it was moved 10 miles (16 km) south on the Burnt River to the property of Andrew J. Weatherby, who was also the first postmaster. In 1884, the Oregon Railway and Navigation Company established a Weatherby station on its line to Huntington. Weatherby post office closed in 1920. Meanwhile, an office was reestablished at the Express Ranch site in 1884 and named Express. The name of that office was changed to Durkee around 1902.

Weatherby is the site of an Oregon Department of Transportation rest area. There was formerly a state historic park north of Weatherby called Rattlesnake Springs that commemorated a stop along the Oregon Trail. It was displaced by the construction of I-84.

During the August 21, 2017 solar eclipse, an estimated 300 cars were parked at the Weatherby rest area on I-84 while visitors observed the event. The path of totality intersected with I-84 at Weatherby.
