= Huntington School District =

Huntington School

Location
- 520 3rd Street E Huntington, Oregon 97907; United States; 44°20′52″N 117°15′46″W

Information
- Type: Public
- School district: Huntington School District
- Principal: Scott Bullock
- Grades: K-12
- Enrollment: 82 (2024-2025)
- Colors: Black and gold
- Athletics conference: OSAA High Desert League 1A-8
- Nickname: Locomotives
- Website: www.huntington.k12.or.us

Huntington School is a public school in Huntington, Oregon, United States. Serving grades K-12, it is the only school in the Huntington School District 16J.

District 16J is mostly in Baker County, with a part in Malheur County.

The school has a dormitory for exchange students.

It took students from the Jefferson School District, with six such students attending Huntington in 1958.

== Demographics ==
The demographic breakdown of the 57 students enrolled in 2013-2014 was:

- Male - 61.4%
- Female - 38.6%
- Hispanic - 1.8%
- White - 93.0%
- Multiracial - 5.2%

80.7% of the students were eligible for free or reduced lunch.

== Athletics ==
The Huntington Locomotives compete in the following sports:

- Basketball (boys' and girls')
- Football (boys')
- Track and field (boys' and girls')
- Volleyball (girls')

All teams except track and field were cooperative with Harper (another small K-12 school approximately 65 miles southwest of Huntington) until June 2017. Since 2017–18 season, with the help of yearly exchange students, Huntington High School is able to compete with full sized volleyball, football and basketball teams for both boys' and girls'.
