= Pocahontas, Oregon =

- Former unincorporated community
- Location within Oregon Location within the United States
- Coordinates: 44°48′52″N 117°58′20″W
- Country: United States
- State: Oregon
- County: Baker
- Elevation: 3,674 ft (1,120 m)
- Time zone: UTC-8 (Pacific (PST))
  - Summer (DST): UTC-7 (PDT)
- GNIS feature ID: 1125494

Pocahontas is a historic former community in Baker County, Oregon, United States. It lies northwest of Baker City along Pocahontas Road near the Elkhorn Mountains.

The town was named after Pocahontas, a famous Native American woman. According to Oregon Geographic Names, which cites Thirty-One Years in Baker County, an unknown number of people laid out a town called Pine City in the 1860s near the base of the mountains. Pine City, probably founded in 1862, was along Pine Creek and was meant to serve as a place of accommodation for miners and others traveling through the region. Meanwhile, John McClain, a rancher who lived nearby, established Pocahontas and persuaded the people of Pine City to move there.

Pocahontas, also meant as a traveler's resting stop, soon had a hotel, blacksmith shop, and express office. It set up a post office on August 4, 1863, with Thomas McMurran as postmaster. The year of the post-office closing is in doubt, either 1864 or 1872.
