= Dixie, Baker County, Oregon =

Unincorporated community in the state of Oregon, United States

Dixie, Oregon
- Unincorporated community
- Location within Oregon Location within the United States
- Coordinates: 44°28′07″N 117°20′02″W
- Country: United States
- State: Oregon
- County: Baker
- Elevation: 2,379 ft (725 m)
- Time zone: UTC-8 (Pacific (PST))
  - Summer (DST): UTC-7 (PDT)
- Area codes: 458 and 541
- GNIS feature ID: 1136221

Dixie is an unincorporated community in Baker County, Oregon, United States. It is along the Burnt River about 5 miles (8 km) north of Lime. Dixie was so-named because it is near the confluence of the Burnt River and Dixie Creek, which in turn was named for the many gold miners from the U.S. South (nicknamed "Dixie") who worked on the creek. Dixie post office was opened in 1913 and closed in 1924. The post office was near the railroad along the Burnt River rather than in the mining area.
