= Powder River (Oregon) =

Powder River (Oregon) Port-pel-lah
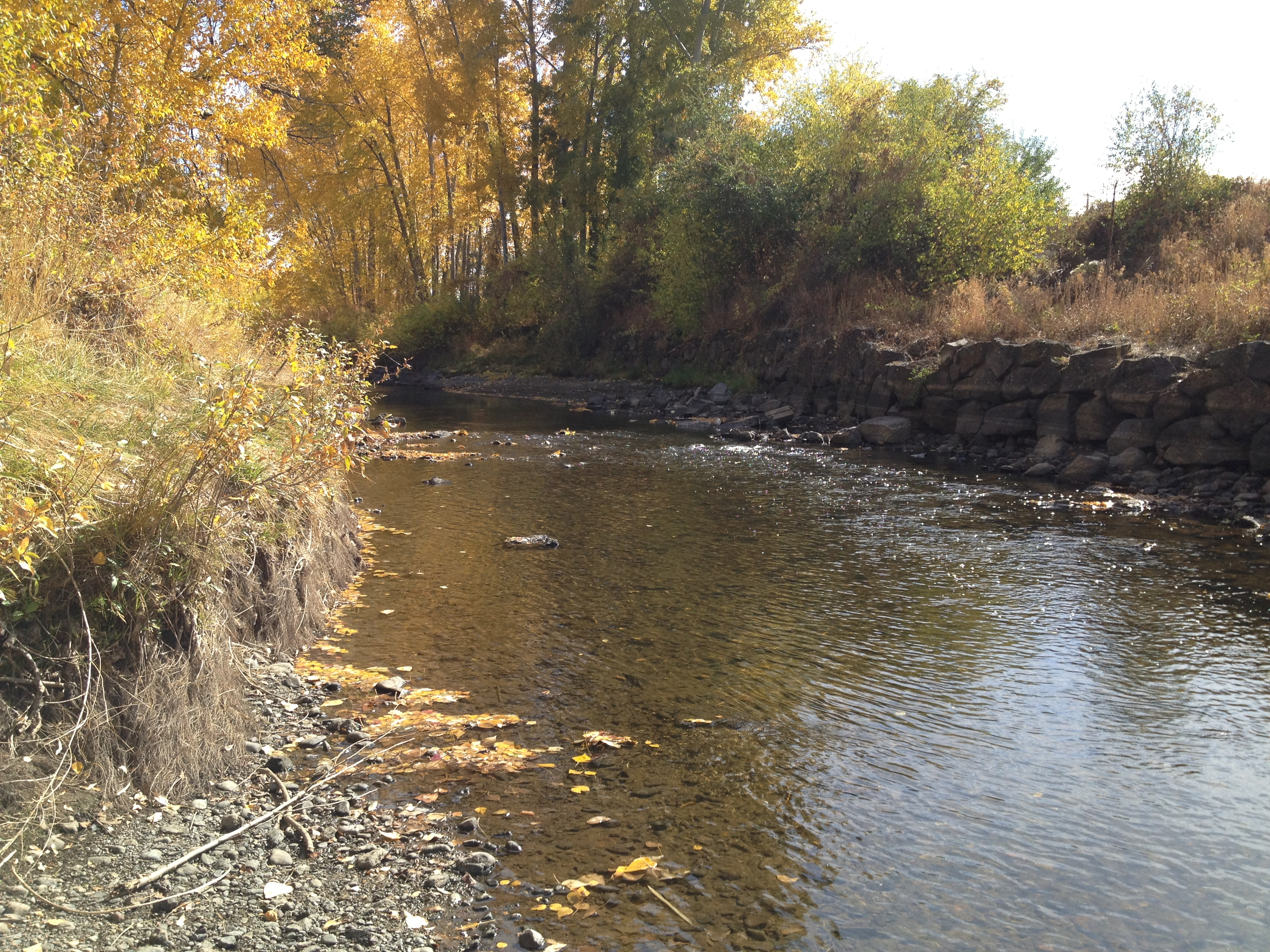
- The Powder River at Baker City

- Location of the mouth of the Powder River in Oregon
- Native name: Polalle Illahe (Chinook jargon)

Location
- Country: United States
- State: Oregon
- Region: Baker and Union counties

Physical characteristics
- Source: Confluence of McCully Fork and Cracker Creek
  - location: Sumpter, Oregon, in the Sumpter Valley Dredge State Heritage Area, Blue Mountains
  - coordinates: 44°44′30″N 118°12′22″W
  - elevation: 4,400 ft (1,300 m)
- Mouth: Brownlee Reservoir on the Snake River
  - location: 10 mi (16 km) east of Richland, Oregon
  - coordinates: 44°44′37″N 117°02′56″W
  - elevation: 2,064 ft (629 m)
- Length: 153 mi (246 km)
- Basin size: 1,603 sq mi (4,150 km^{2})
- Discharge
  - average: 534 cu ft/s (15.1 m^{3}/s)

National Wild and Scenic River
- Type: Scenic
- Designated: October 28, 1988

The Powder River is a tributary of the Snake River, approximately 153 miles (246 km) long, in northeast Oregon in the United States. It drains an area of the Columbia Plateau on the eastern side of the Blue Mountains. It flows almost entirely within Baker County but downstream of the city of North Powder forms part of the border between Baker County and Union County.

== Name ==
The name Powder River is first recorded in the journals of Peter Skene Ogden without notation of the origin of the name. Explorer Donald Mackenzie likely named the river. William C. McKay, grandson of John Jacob Astor's partner Alexander MacKay, says that the origin of the name is from the powdery and sandy soil along the shores of the river, from the Chinook Jargon polalle illahe. It appears on Lewis and Clark's maps as Port-pel-lah.

== Course ==
The Powder River's tributaries arise in the southern Blue Mountains in the Umatilla National Forest. The river's main stem begins in Sumpter, where McCully Fork, Cracker Creek and several smaller tributaries join, and flows east-southeast through the tailings of past dredge mining and into Phillips Reservoir. After exiting Phillips Reservoir, the river continues east for about 7 miles (11 km) before turning sharply north through the Bowen Valley and Baker City, Oregon. From here the river meanders the floor of the Baker Valley and passes by the cities of Haines and North Powder, where it is joined by the North Powder River. Here the river turns again sharply east-southeast, flowing through Thief Valley Reservoir, in a valley along the southern edge of the Wallowa Mountains. The river then transits the Lower Powder Valley and enters the Snake River on the Idaho–Oregon state line from the west, upstream from the Brownlee Dam at the Powder Arm of Brownlee Reservoir 11 miles (18 km) downstream from Richland.

=== Tributaries ===
Major streams flowing into the Powder are Eagle Creek, Wolf Creek, Rock Creek and the North Powder River.

== Watershed ==
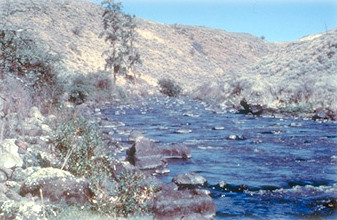
The Wild and Scenic Powder River

The Powder River watershed drains 1,603 square miles (4,150 km^{2}) of northeastern Oregon. There are three man-made reservoirs on the Powder River: Phillips Reservoir (behind Mason Dam), Thief Valley Reservoir, and also the Powder arm of Brownlee Reservoir at the Oregon–Idaho border at the confluence of the Powder and Snake Rivers.

In 1988, 11.7 miles (18.8 km) of the Powder River was designated Wild and Scenic. Between the Thief Valley Dam and the Oregon Route 203 bridge, this stretch flows through a rugged canyon with spectacular geologic formations.

== Flora and fauna ==
Beaver (Castor canadensis) populations are increasing along the river, with an excellent viewing area just off Oregon Route 7 below Mason Dam, about 14 miles (23 km) from Baker City. There, a colony of beavers constructed a large dam easily viewed below the footbridge adjacent to the paved parking area. Recovered from near extirpation by the Hudson's Bay Company, who tried to create a "fur desert" to discourage Americans from coming to the far western states, benefits of beaver in arid eastern Oregon include creating ponds which along young salmonids to grow, raising the water table as their ponds recharge groundwater supplies and creating wetlands which trap sediment and pollutants.

The Powder River was once an important spawning stream for Chinook salmon (Oncorhynchus tshawytscha) and steelhead trout (Oncorhyncus mykiss) coming from the Pacific Ocean. Chinook salmon once migrated by the thousands to spawn in the Powder River and many of its tributaries from its headwaters to the lower end of the North Powder Valley, but that stopped when the Thief Valley Dam was built near North Powder in 1931. The building of two later dams in Hells Canyon on the Snake River – Hells Canyon Dam (1967) and Brownlee Dam also permanently block salmon passage. The Oregon Department of Fish and Wildlife often release Chinook salmon on the Powder River for sportfishing at Mason Dam below Phillips Reservoir.

== See also ==
- List of rivers of Oregon
- List of longest streams of Oregon
- List of National Wild and Scenic Rivers
