= Huntington, Oregon =

- City
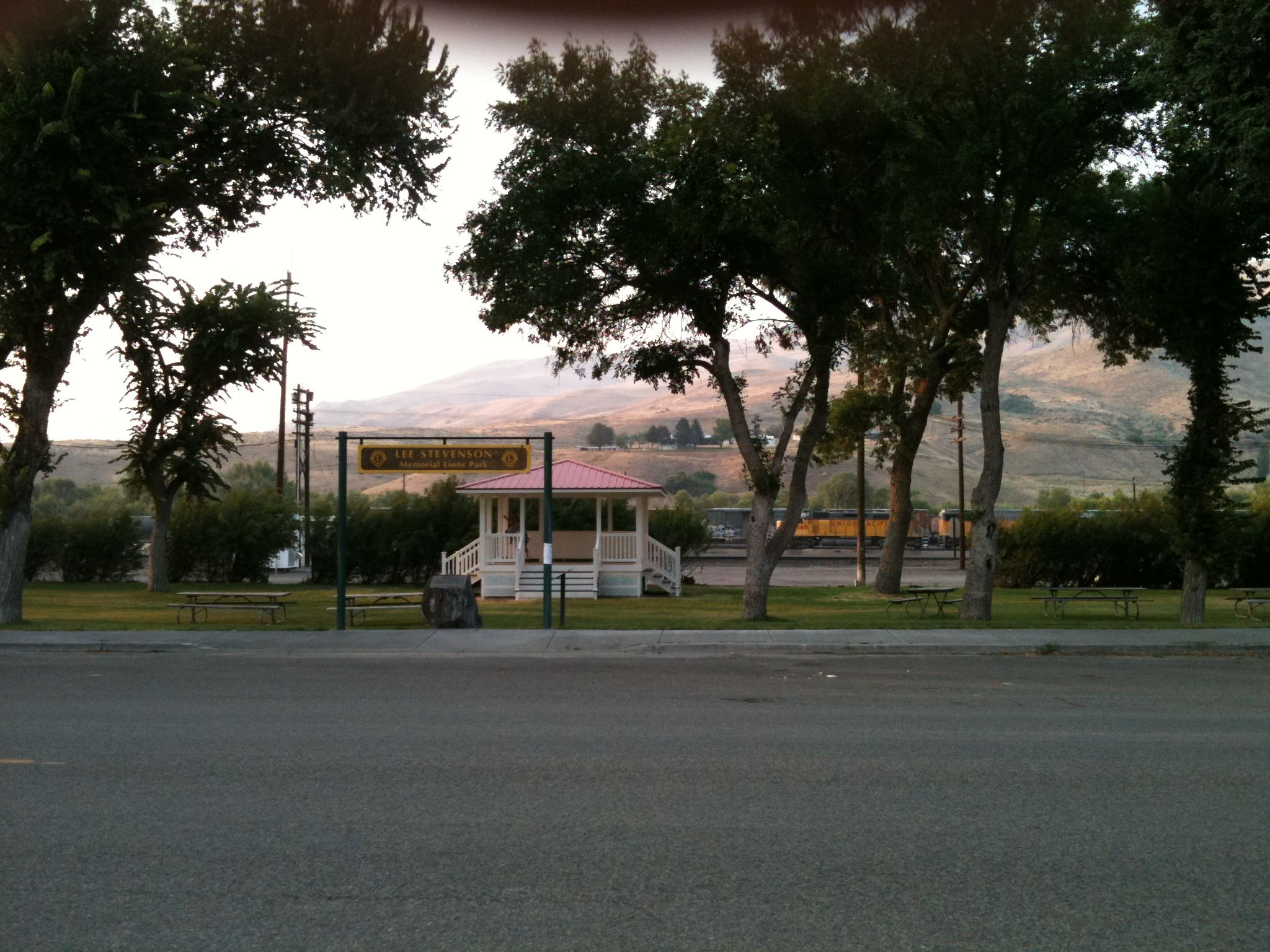
- Looking north from Huntington

- Location in Oregon
- Coordinates: 44°21′1″N 117°15′56″W
- Country: United States
- State: Oregon
- County: Baker
- Incorporated: 1891

Area
  - Total: 0.74 sq mi (1.92 km^{2})
  - Land: 0.74 sq mi (1.92 km^{2})
  - Water: 0 sq mi (0.00 km^{2})
- Elevation: 2,123 ft (647 m)

Population (2020)
  - Total: 502
  - Density: 678.3/sq mi (261.91/km^{2})
- Time zone: UTC-8 (Pacific)
  - Summer (DST): UTC-7 (Pacific)
- ZIP code: 97907
- Area code: 541
- FIPS code: 41-35700
- GNIS feature ID: 2410808
- Website: www.cityofhuntingtonor.gov

Huntington is a city in Baker County, on the eastern border of Oregon, United States. It is located on the Snake River and along Interstate 84 and U.S. Route 30. The population was 502 at the 2020 census.

== History ==
Henry Miller settled in the area in August 1862. In 1870, Miller's Stagecoach Station was established before the coming of the Oregon Railway and Navigation Company rail line in 1884, and was platted in 1885 or 1886. It soon became the primary shipping point for the cattle country to the south. Miller built the Stage Tavern, known for many years as "Miller Station". It was on the overland route that had been established in the valley, and had become well known to all who traveled in pioneer days. According to Oregon Geographic Names, Huntington was named for J.B. and J.M. Huntington, brothers who purchased Miller's holdings in 1882.

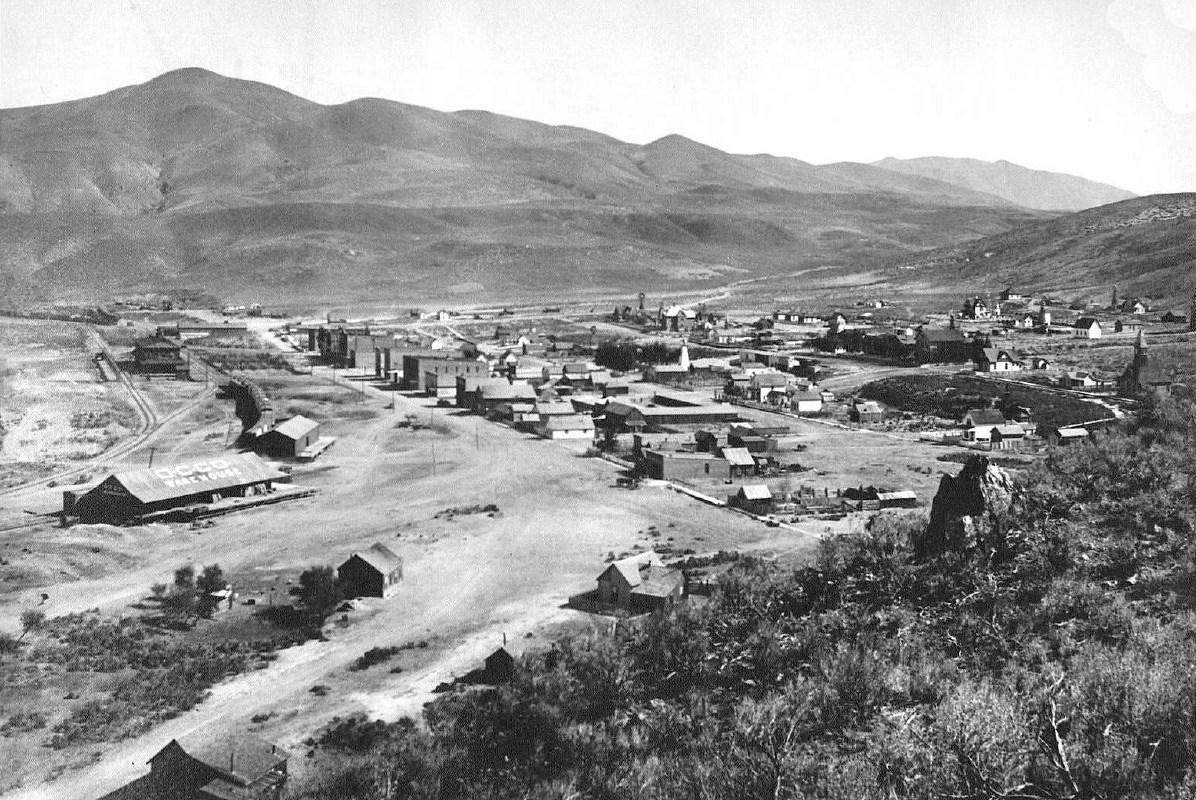
Huntington, c. 1890

The Huntingtons maintained a small trading post on their land. In 1884, the rails of the Oregon Short Line and the Oregon Railroad and Navigation Company line were joined in Huntington. Since that time, Huntington has been an important railway division point. With the advent of the railroad came J.T. Fifer, who had been selling general merchandise to the construction crews moving his goods from town to town as the work progressed. Shortly after Fifer arrived, the Huntingtons closed up, leaving him alone in the general merchandise business. The Oregon Construction Company followed soon, with a stock of general merchandise, a blacksmith shop, the Pacific Hotel, several boarding houses and restaurants and a number of saloons.

In 1898, the Northwest Railroad Company began extending a short line down the Snake River. It reached Homestead about 1910. This increased transportation at Huntington and gave an outlet for Eagle and Pine Valley fruits, cattle, lumber and ore. This line was flooded by water from Brownlee Dam. Huntington became the only incorporated city in Baker County on the Oregon Trail in 1891 with Home Rule Law.

Remnants of the Old Oregon Trail can still be seen today when one is traveling north from Farewell Bend State Recreation Area toward the town of Huntington on U.S. Route 30.

Evidence of the hardships and tragedies of the pioneer movement still exists: a small iron cross, visible from Route 30, marks the location where Snake River Shoshone Indians killed a number of emigrants in 1860.

At the end of the 19th century, Huntington developed a reputation as "Sin City", a rugged frontier town having its share of saloons, Chinese opium dens, and gunslingers.

Governor Oswald West was motivated to clean up the city, along with the community of Copperfield, in 1912–14.

The first ransom bill from the 1935 George Weyerhaeuser kidnapping turned up in Huntington.

Huntington's two marijuana dispensaries, which opened in 2016, had almost $15 million in sales in 2017, and were on pace to top $25 million in 2018, mostly serving Idahoans.

== Geography ==
According to the United States Census Bureau, the city has a total area of 0.75 square miles (1.94 km^{2}), all of it land. Huntington is across the Snake River from the westernmost point of Idaho.

=== Climate ===
Climate data for Huntington, Oregon
Month	Jan	Feb	Mar	Apr	May	Jun	Jul	Aug	Sep	Oct	Nov	Dec	Year
Record high °F (°C)	69 (21)	68 (20)	83 (28)	94 (34)	104 (40)	108 (42)	113 (45)	115 (46)	106 (41)	94 (34)	80 (27)	71 (22)	115 (46)
Mean daily maximum °F (°C)	36.8 (2.7)	44.1 (6.7)	55.2 (12.9)	65.3 (18.5)	74.7 (23.7)	83.3 (28.5)	94.2 (34.6)	92.4 (33.6)	80.9 (27.2)	67.1 (19.5)	49.8 (9.9)	38.8 (3.8)	65.2 (18.4)
Daily mean °F (°C)	28.3 (−2.1)	34.5 (1.4)	43.6 (6.4)	52.0 (11.1)	60.9 (16.1)	69.2 (20.7)	79.0 (26.1)	77.0 (25.0)	65.6 (18.7)	52.7 (11.5)	38.9 (3.8)	30.3 (−0.9)	52.7 (11.5)
Mean daily minimum °F (°C)	20.0 (−6.7)	24.9 (−3.9)	31.9 (−0.1)	38.7 (3.7)	47.1 (8.4)	55.2 (12.9)	64.0 (17.8)	61.5 (16.4)	50.1 (10.1)	38.4 (3.6)	28.2 (−2.1)	22.0 (−5.6)	40.2 (4.6)
Record low °F (°C)	−19 (−28)	−19 (−28)	5 (−15)	12 (−11)	10 (−12)	28 (−2)	40 (4)	31 (−1)	27 (−3)	14 (−10)	−8 (−22)	−17 (−27)	−19 (−28)
Average precipitation inches (mm)	1.73 (44)	1.47 (37)	1.14 (29)	0.85 (22)	1.00 (25)	0.85 (22)	0.34 (8.6)	0.38 (9.7)	0.45 (11)	0.70 (18)	1.47 (37)	1.82 (46)	12.19 (310)
Average snowfall inches (cm)	11.5 (29)	4.7 (12)	1.0 (2.5)	0.1 (0.25)	0.0 (0.0)	0.0 (0.0)	0.0 (0.0)	0.0 (0.0)	0.0 (0.0)	0.1 (0.25)	2.3 (5.8)	8.1 (21)	27.6 (70)
Average precipitation days	9	8	7	6	6	5	2	2	3	4	8	9	68

== Demographics ==
Historical population
Census	Pop.	Note	%±
1880	200		—
1890	321		60.5%
1900	821		155.8%
1910	680		−17.2%
1920	666		−2.1%
1930	803		20.6%
1940	741		−7.7%
1950	733		−1.1%
1960	689		−6.0%
1970	507		−26.4%
1980	539		6.3%
1990	522		−3.2%
2000	515		−1.3%
2010	440		−14.6%
2020	502		14.1%

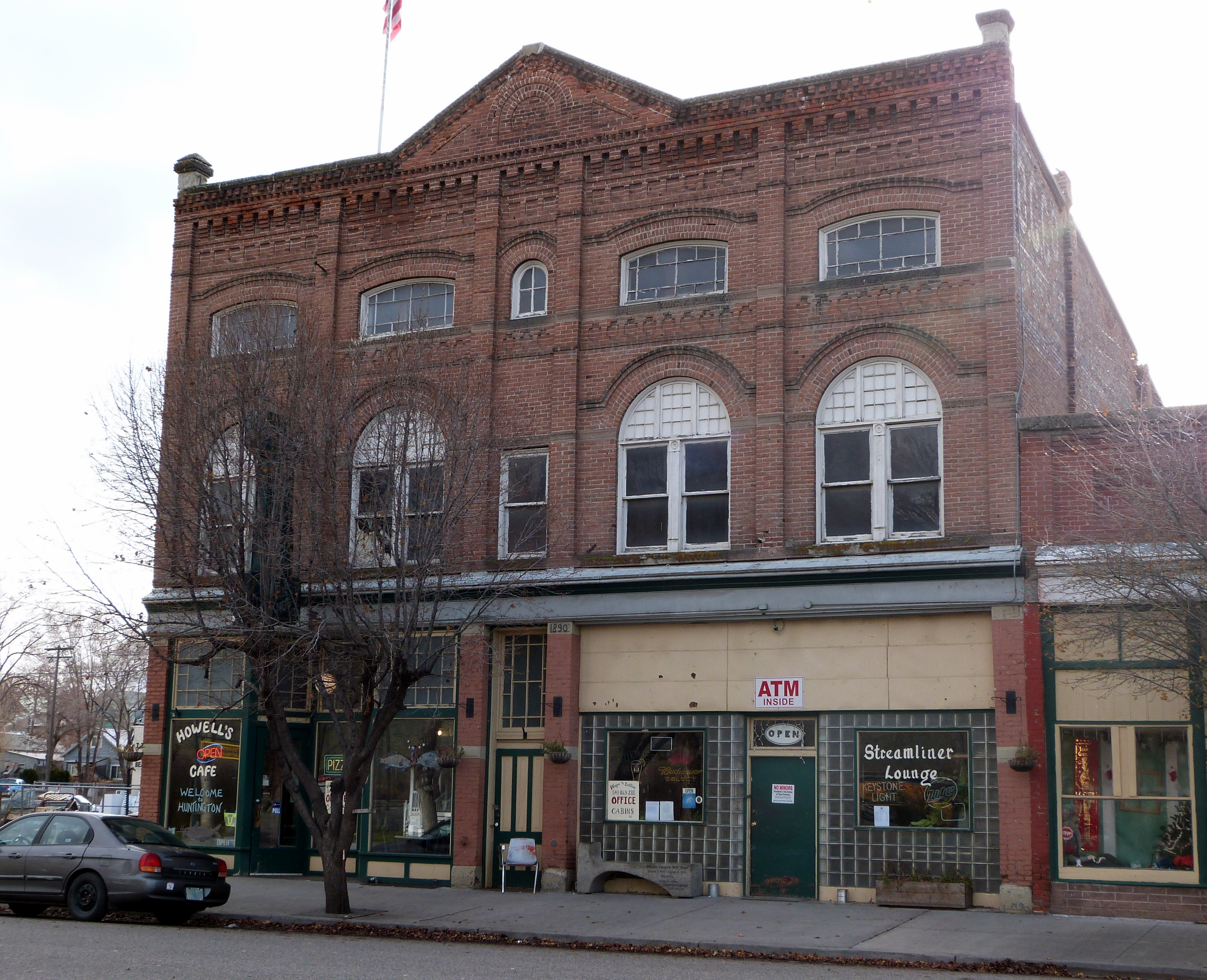
The Oregon Commercial Company Building was listed on the National Register of Historic Places

=== 2020 census ===
As of the 2020 census, Huntington had a population of 502. The median age was 52.0 years. 19.9% of residents were under the age of 18 and 27.7% were 65 years of age or older. For every 100 females there were 110.0 males, and for every 100 females age 18 and over there were 105.1 males.

0% of residents lived in urban areas, while 100.0% lived in rural areas.

There were 209 households in Huntington, of which 25.8% had children under the age of 18 living in them. Of all households, 36.8% were married-couple households, 28.7% were households with a male householder and no spouse or partner present, and 25.4% were households with a female householder and no spouse or partner present. About 32.1% of all households were made up of individuals and 19.6% had someone living alone who was 65 years of age or older.

There were 270 housing units, of which 22.6% were vacant. Among occupied housing units, 64.1% were owner-occupied and 35.9% were renter-occupied. The homeowner vacancy rate was 1.4% and the rental vacancy rate was 12.5%.

Racial composition as of the 2020 census
Race	Number	Percent
White	446	88.8%
Black or African American	0	0%
American Indian and Alaska Native	6	1.2%
Asian	0	0%
Native Hawaiian and Other Pacific Islander	0	0%
Some other race	2	0.4%
Two or more races	48	9.6%
Hispanic or Latino (of any race)	13	2.6%

=== 2010 census ===
As of the census of 2010, there were 440 people, 211 households, and 112 families residing in the city. The population density was 586.7 inhabitants per square mile (226.5/km^{2}). There were 272 housing units at an average density of 362.7 per square mile (140.0/km^{2}). The racial makeup of the city was 92.3% White, 0.2% African American, 3.9% Native American, 0.7% Asian, 0.5% from other races, and 2.5% from two or more races. Hispanic or Latino of any race were 1.8% of the population.

There were 211 households, of which 16.6% had children under the age of 18 living with them, 42.2% were married couples living together, 5.2% had a female householder with no husband present, 5.7% had a male householder with no wife present, and 46.9% were non-families. 38.9% of all households were made up of individuals, and 17.1% had someone living alone who was 65 years of age or older. The average household size was 2.09 and the average family size was 2.78.

The median age in the city was 54 years. 16.6% of residents were under the age of 18; 6.2% were between the ages of 18 and 24; 16% were from 25 to 44; 30.7% were from 45 to 64; and 30.7% were 65 years of age or older. The gender makeup of the city was 51.8% male and 48.2% female.

=== 2000 census ===
As of the census of 2000, there were 515 people, 232 households, and 150 families residing in the city. The population density was 700.8 inhabitants per square mile (270.6/km^{2}). There were 301 housing units at an average density of 409.6 per square mile (158.1/km^{2}). The racial makeup of the city was 97.67% White, 0.39% African American, 0.97% Native American, and 0.97% from two or more races. Hispanic or Latino of any race were 2.14% of the population.

There were 232 households, out of which 21.1% had children under the age of 18 living with them, 53.9% were married couples living together, 6.9% had a female householder with no husband present, and 35.3% were non-families. 31.5% of all households were made up of individuals, and 10.8% had someone living alone who was 65 years of age or older. The average household size was 2.22 and the average family size was 2.73.

In the city, the population was spread out, with 22.3% under the age of 18, 5.4% from 18 to 24, 21.6% from 25 to 44, 27.2% from 45 to 64, and 23.5% who were 65 years of age or older. The median age was 46 years. For every 100 females, there were 113.7 males. For every 100 females age 18 and over, there were 105.1 males age 18 and over.

The median income for a household in the city was $25,132, and the median income for a family was $30,781. Males had a median income of $27,500 versus $22,083 for females. The per capita income for the city was $13,396. About 10.7% of families and 17.7% of the population were below the poverty line, including 30.8% of those under age 18 and 9.8% of those age 65 or over.

== Education ==
Huntington School District 16J operates the K-12 Huntington School.

The portion of the county where Huntington is located is in the Treasure Valley Community College district.
