= Haines, Oregon =

- City
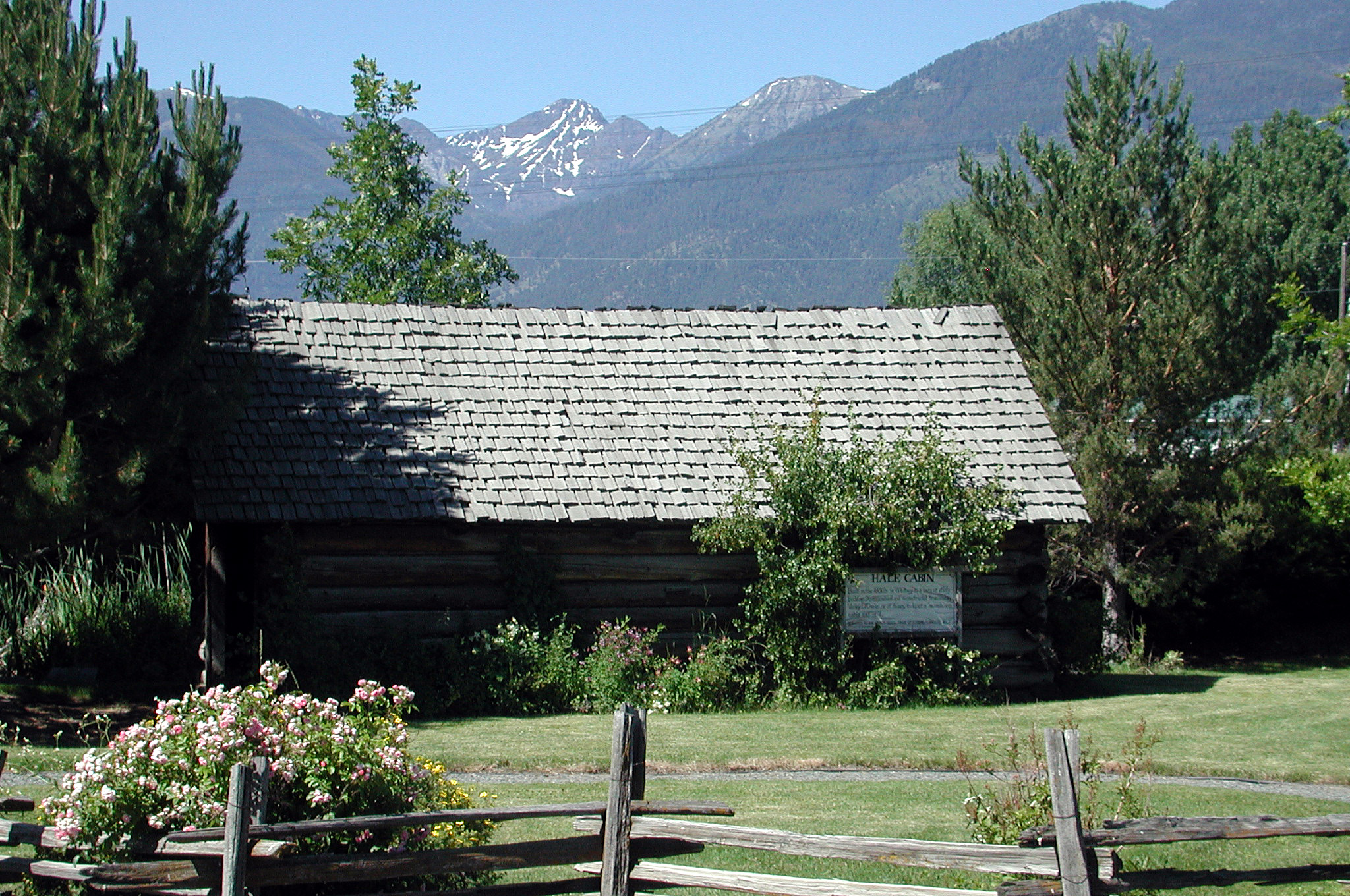
- Restored 19th-century cabin in Haines city park
- Nickname: The Biggest Little City in Oregon
- Location in Oregon
- Coordinates: 44°54′44″N 117°56′22″W
- Country: United States
- State: Oregon
- County: Baker
- Incorporated: 1909

Government
  - Mayor: Dennis Anthony

Area
  - Total: 0.76 sq mi (1.96 km^{2})
  - Land: 0.76 sq mi (1.96 km^{2})
  - Water: 0 sq mi (0.00 km^{2})
- Elevation: 3,337 ft (1,017 m)

Population (2020)
  - Total: 373
  - Density: 494/sq mi (190.6/km^{2})
- Time zone: UTC-8 (Pacific)
  - Summer (DST): UTC-7 (Pacific)
- ZIP code: 97833
- Area code: 541
- FIPS code: 41-31600
- GNIS feature ID: 2410683
- Website: cityofhainesor.org

Haines is a city in Baker County, Oregon, United States. The population was 373 at the 2020 census.

== History ==
Haines was platted in 1885 or 1886 along the Oregon Railway and Navigation Company rail line; it was a stage stop before then.

== Geography ==
According to the United States Census Bureau, the city has a total area of 0.76 square miles (1.97 km^{2}), all of it land.

=== Climate ===
The region experiences warm (but not hot) and dry summers, with no average monthly temperatures above 71.6 °F (22.0 °C). According to the Köppen Climate Classification system, Haines has a warm-summer Mediterranean climate, abbreviated "Csb" on climate maps.

== Demographics ==
Historical population
Census	Pop.	Note	%±
1910	423		—
1920	503		18.9%
1930	431		−14.3%
1940	377		−12.5%
1950	321		−14.9%
1960	331		3.1%
1970	314		−5.1%
1980	341		8.6%
1990	405		18.8%
2000	426		5.2%
2010	416		−2.3%
2020	373		−10.3%
U.S. Decennial Census

=== 2020 census ===
As of the 2020 census, Haines had a population of 373. The median age was 46.1 years. 22.8% of residents were under the age of 18 and 20.9% of residents were 65 years of age or older. For every 100 females there were 93.3 males, and for every 100 females age 18 and over there were 87.0 males age 18 and over.

0% of residents lived in urban areas, while 100.0% lived in rural areas.

There were 169 households in Haines, of which 26.0% had children under the age of 18 living in them. Of all households, 42.0% were married-couple households, 20.7% were households with a male householder and no spouse or partner present, and 33.1% were households with a female householder and no spouse or partner present. About 32.5% of all households were made up of individuals and 16.0% had someone living alone who was 65 years of age or older.

There were 194 housing units, of which 12.9% were vacant. Among occupied housing units, 72.2% were owner-occupied and 27.8% were renter-occupied. The homeowner vacancy rate was 1.6% and the rental vacancy rate was 4.1%.

Racial composition as of the 2020 census
Race	Number	Percent
White	341	91.4%
Black or African American	0	0%
American Indian and Alaska Native	7	1.9%
Asian	0	0%
Native Hawaiian and Other Pacific Islander	0	0%
Some other race	6	1.6%
Two or more races	19	5.1%
Hispanic or Latino (of any race)	10	2.7%

=== 2010 census ===
As of the census of 2010, there were 416 people, 175 households, and 115 families living in the city. The population density was 547.4 inhabitants per square mile (211.4/km^{2}). There were 201 housing units at an average density of 264.5 per square mile (102.1/km^{2}). The racial makeup of the city was 94.5% White, 1.2% Native American, 0.7% from other races, and 3.6% from two or more races. Hispanic or Latino of any race were 1.4% of the population.

There were 175 households, of which 30.3% had children under the age of 18 living with them. 46.9% were married couples living together, 11.4% had a female householder with no husband present, 7.4% had a male householder with no wife present, and 34.3% were non-families. 27.4% of all households were made up of individuals, and 12% had someone living alone who was 65 years of age or older. The average household size was 2.38 and the average family size was 2.78.

The median age in the city was 43.3 years. 23.3% of residents were under the age of 18; 7.3% were between the ages of 18 and 24; 21.9% were from 25 to 44; 32.1% were from 45 to 64; and 15.4% were 65 years of age or older. The gender makeup of the city was 50.5% male and 49.5% female.

=== 2000 census ===
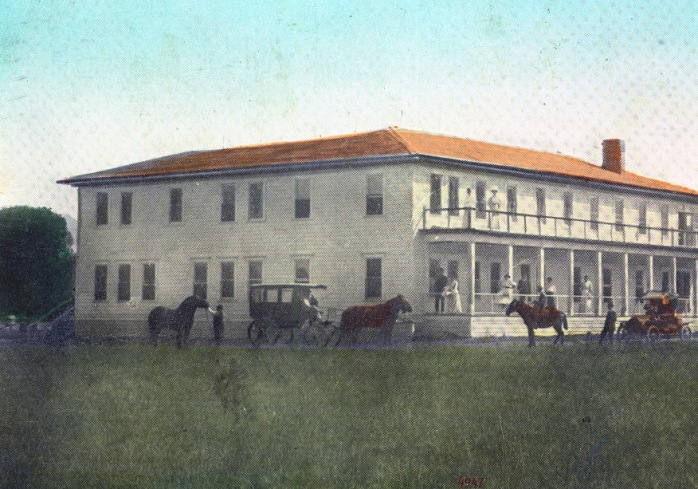
The Radium Springs Sanitarium near Haines, in 1910

As of the census of 2000 there were 426 people, 183 households, and 127 families living in the city. The population density was 535.9 inhabitants per square mile (206.9/km^{2}). There were 207 housing units at an average density of 260.4 per square mile (100.5/km^{2}). The racial makeup of the city was 95.77% White, 1.64% Native American, 0.47% Asian, and 2.11% from two or more races. Hispanic or Latino of any race were 1.64% of the population.

There were 183 households, out of which 32.8% had children under the age of 18 living with them. 50.3% were married couples living together, 12.0% had a female householder with no husband present, and 30.6% were non-families. 27.3% of all households were made up of individuals, and 13.1% had someone living alone who was 65 years of age or older. The average household size was 2.33 and the average family size was 2.82.

In the city the population was spread out, with 27.2% under the age of 18, 5.6% from 18 to 24, 26.3% from 25 to 44, 24.2% from 45 to 64, and 16.7% who were 65 years of age or older. The median age was 39 years. For every 100 females, there were 96.3 males. For every 100 females age 18 and over, there were 93.8 males.

The median income for a household in the city was $25,000; the median income for a family was $26,500. Males had a median income of $18,750 versus $14,875 for females. The per capita income for the city was $13,134. About 22.1% of families and 25.0% of the population were below the poverty line, including 41.7% of those under age 18 and 8.1% of those age 65 or over.
