= Baker County, Oregon =

County in Oregon, United States

- County
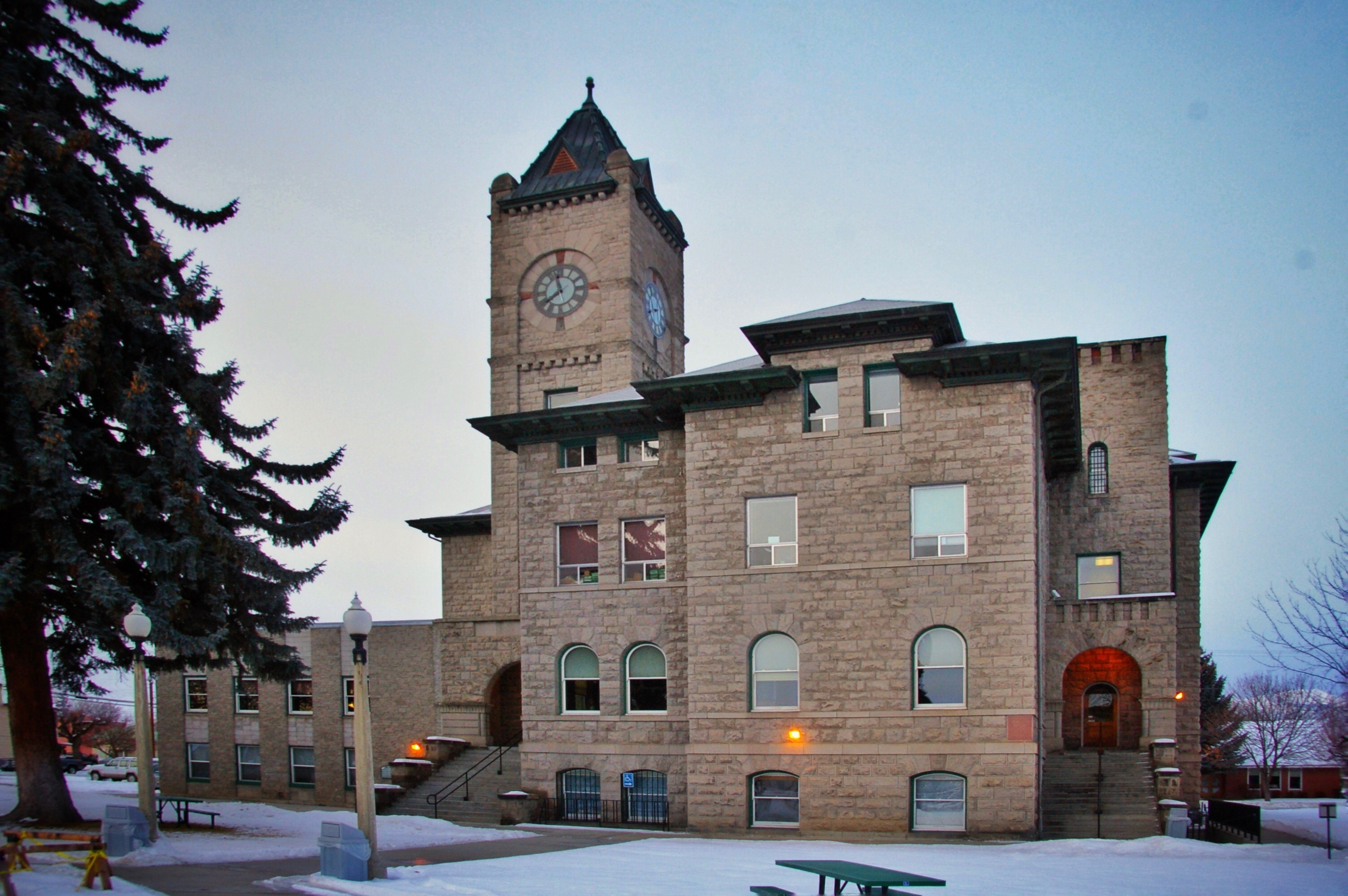
- Baker County Courthouse in Baker City

- Seal

- Location within the U.S. state of Oregon
- Coordinates: 44°43′N 117°40′W
- Country: United States
- State: Oregon
- Founded: September 22, 1862
- Named for: Edward D. Baker
- Seat: Baker City
- Largest city: Baker City

Area
  - Total: 3,088 sq mi (8,000 km^{2})
  - Land: 3,068 sq mi (7,950 km^{2})
  - Water: 20 sq mi (52 km^{2}) 0.6%

Population (2020)
  - Total: 16,668
  - Estimate (2025): 16,658 ▼
  - Density: 5.22/sq mi (2.02/km^{2})
- Time zone: UTC−8 (Pacific)
  - Summer (DST): UTC−7 (PDT)
- Congressional district: 2nd
- Website: www.bakercountyor.gov

Map of Baker County

Baker County (//) is one of the 36 counties in the U.S. state of Oregon. As of the 2020 census, the population was 16,668. The county seat and largest city is Baker City. The county was organized on September 22, 1862, when a portion of Wasco County was partitioned off. The new county's area was reduced in 1864 when Union County was partitioned off, and again in 1887 when Malheur County was partitioned off. The county's lines were last adjusted in 1901 when a parcel was added to the county.

Baker County was named for Edward Dickinson Baker, a senator from Oregon who was killed at Ball's Bluff, a battle of the Civil War in Virginia in 1861. The county is part of the county definition of Eastern Oregon.

== History ==
The first groups from the eastern U.S. following the Oregon Trail passed through the area on their way to the Willamette Valley, unaware of the potential wealth they passed over. At Flagstaff Hill, near Baker City, 15 miles (24 km) of wagon ruts left by immigrants can still be seen.

Oregon Territory achieved statehood in 1859. In 1861 gold was discovered in eastern Wasco County, and a gold rush ensued. The area quickly became the Northwest's largest producer of gold. In September 1862 the state assembly created Baker County from Wasco. Later, Union County and Malheur County were created from this county. Baker County's boundaries were adjusted for the last time in 1901, when the area between the Powder River and the Wallowa Mountains was returned to the county.

Auburn was the original county seat; a booming mining town with 5,000 inhabitants. Once the gold was mined out Auburn's population dwindled. In 1868 county voters made Baker City the new county seat. Baker City was incorporated in 1874.

The population of Baker County nearly quadrupled from 1880 to 1910, largely due to the Sumpter Valley Railroad and several of its spur lines. The opening of the railroad helped lumber and mining operations develop.

In 1914 Fern Hobbs, on behalf of her employer Governor Oswald West, declared martial law in the Baker County city of Copperfield. This was the first declaration of martial law in the state since the American Civil War.

From 1915 through 1946, Baker County was represented in the Oregon State Senate by William H. Strayer. When he died in 1946, Strayer had served in the Oregon legislature longer than any person in the state's history.

== Geography ==
According to the United States Census Bureau, the county has a total area of 3,088 square miles (8,000 km^{2}), of which 3,068 square miles (7,950 km^{2}) is land and 20 square miles (52 km^{2}) (0.6%) is water.

The terrain of Baker County is generally rugged, with 30 percent of the county covered with forest. The county's highest point is Red Mountain at around 9,560 feet (2,910 m) ASL, located 1.9 miles (3 km) from the county's northern line. The eastern boundary of the county is described by the northward-flowing Snake River, and the county terrain generally slopes to the Snake River's valley.

=== Adjacent counties ===
- Union County - north
- Wallowa County - northeast
- Adams County, Idaho - east/Mountain Time Border
- Washington County, Idaho - southeast/Mountain Time Border
- Malheur County - south/Mountain Time Border
- Grant County - west

=== National protected areas ===
- Deer Flat National Wildlife Refuge (part)
- Hells Canyon National Recreation Area (part)
- Malheur National Forest (part)
- Whitman National Forest (part)

== Demographics ==
Historical population
Census	Pop.	Note	%±
1870	2,804		—
1880	4,616		64.6%
1890	6,764		46.5%
1900	15,597		130.6%
1910	18,076		15.9%
1920	17,929		−0.8%
1930	16,754		−6.6%
1940	18,297		9.2%
1950	16,175		−11.6%
1960	17,295		6.9%
1970	14,919		−13.7%
1980	16,134		8.1%
1990	15,317		−5.1%
2000	16,741		9.3%
2010	16,134		−3.6%
2020	16,668		3.3%
2025 (est.)	16,658	▼	−0.1%
U.S. Decennial Census; 1790–1960, 1900–1990, 1990–2000, 2010–2020

=== 2020 census ===
Baker County, Oregon – Racial and ethnic composition Note: the US Census treats Hispanic/Latino as an ethnic category. This table excludes Latinos from the racial categories and assigns them to a separate category. Hispanics/Latinos may be of any race.
Race / Ethnicity (NH = Non-Hispanic)	Pop 1980	Pop 1990	Pop 2000	Pop 2010	Pop 2020	% 1980	% 1990	% 2000	% 2010	% 2020
White alone (NH)	15,752	14,829	15,838	14,944	14,664	97.63%	96.81%	94.61%	92.62%	87.98%
Black or African American alone (NH)	11	29	37	52	70	0.07%	0.19%	0.22%	0.32%	0.42%
Native American or Alaska Native alone (NH)	88	137	167	170	172	0.55%	0.89%	1.00%	1.05%	1.03%
Asian alone (NH)	34	45	62	78	64	0.21%	0.29%	0.37%	0.48%	0.38%
Native Hawaiian or Pacific Islander alone (NH)	x	x	7	9	15	x	x	0.04%	0.06%	0.09%
Other race alone (NH)	43	1	10	7	98	0.27%	0.01%	0.06%	0.04%	0.59%
Mixed race or Multiracial (NH)	x	x	228	346	776	x	x	1.36%	2.14%	4.66%
Hispanic or Latino (any race)	206	276	392	528	809	1.28%	1.80%	2.34%	3.27%	4.85%
Total	16,134	15,317	16,741	16,134	16,668	100.00%	100.00%	100.00%	100.00%	100.00%

=== American Community Survey 2025 data ===
The United States Census Bureau estimated that in 2025, Baker County’s population was 16.658. It was also estimated that the county's population was 87,77% Non-Hispanic White, 6,21% Hispanic or Latino, 0,67% Non-Hispanic Black, 0,55% Asian, 1,08% Native American, 0,16% Pacific Islander, and 3,57% Multiracial.

Total	Population	Percentage
Non-Hispanic White	14.621	87,77%
Hispanic or Latino	1.034	6,21%
Non-Hispanic Black	111	0,67%
Asian	91	0,55%
Native American	180	1,08%
Pacific Islander	27	0,16%
Non-Hispanic Multiracial	594	3,57%

As of the 2020 census, the county had a population of 16,668. Of the residents, 19.7% were under the age of 18 and 27.0% were 65 years of age or older; the median age was 48.4 years. For every 100 females there were 104.0 males, and for every 100 females age 18 and over there were 102.2 males. 58.6% of residents lived in urban areas and 41.4% lived in rural areas.

The racial makeup of the county was 89.6% White, 0.5% Black or African American, 1.1% American Indian and Alaska Native, 0.4% Asian, 0.1% Native Hawaiian and Pacific Islander, 2.1% from some other race, and 6.2% from two or more races. Hispanic or Latino residents of any race comprised 4.9% of the population.

There were 7,201 households in the county, of which 23.3% had children under the age of 18 living with them and 25.1% had a female householder with no spouse or partner present. About 32.0% of all households were made up of individuals and 17.7% had someone living alone who was 65 years of age or older.

There were 8,609 housing units, of which 16.4% were vacant. Among occupied housing units, 69.2% were owner-occupied and 30.8% were renter-occupied. The homeowner vacancy rate was 1.6% and the rental vacancy rate was 6.3%.

=== 2010 census ===
As of the 2010 census, there were 16,134 people, 7,040 households, and 4,430 families residing in the county. The population density was 5.3 inhabitants per square mile (2.0/km^{2}). There were 8,826 housing units at an average density of 2.9 per square mile (1.1/km^{2}). The racial makeup of the county was 94.6% white, 1.1% American Indian, 0.5% Asian, 0.4% black or African American, 0.1% Pacific islander, 1.0% from other races, and 2.4% from two or more races. Those of Hispanic or Latino origin made up 3.3% of the population. In terms of ancestry, 24.5% were German, 14.8% were Irish, 14.6% were English, and 8.1% were American.

Of the 7,040 households, 24.4% had children under the age of 18 living with them, 50.7% were married couples living together, 8.3% had a female householder with no husband present, 37.1% were non-families, and 31.2% of all households were made up of individuals. The average household size was 2.24 and the average family size was 2.78. The median age was 47.9 years.

The median income for a household in the county was $39,704 and the median income for a family was $50,507. Males had a median income of $43,849 versus $30,167 for females. The per capita income for the county was $21,683. About 12.7% of families and 19.9% of the population were below the poverty line, including 27.2% of those under age 18 and 10.6% of those age 65 or over.

=== 2000 census ===
As of the 2000 census, there were 16,741 people, 6,883 households, and 4,680 families in the county. The population density was 6 people per square mile (2.3 people/km^{2}). There were 8,402 housing units at an average density of 3 units per square mile (1.2/km^{2}). The racial makeup of the county was:

- 95.68% White
- 0.23% Black or African American
- 1.09% Native American
- 0.38% Asian
- 0.04% Pacific Islander
- 0.92% from other races
- 1.65% from two or more races.

2.34% of the population were Hispanic or Latino of any race. 18.4% were of English, 17.4% German, 11.4% American and 9.1% Irish ancestry.

There were 6,883 households, out of which 28.00% had children under the age of 18 living with them, 56.20% were married couples living together, 8.60% had a female householder with no husband present, and 32.00% were non-families. 27.80% of all households were made up of individuals, and 13.40% had someone living alone who was 65 years of age or older. The average household size was 2.37 and the average family size was 2.87.

The county population contained 24.20% under the age of 18, 5.80% from 18 to 24, 23.60% from 25 to 44, 27.30% from 45 to 64, and 19.00% who were 65 years of age or older. The median age was 43 years. For every 100 females there were 98.10 males. For every 100 females age 18 and over, there were 95.30 males.

The median income for a household in the county was $30,367, and the median income for a family was $36,106. Males had a median income of $27,133 versus $20,480 for females. The per capita income for the county was $15,612. About 10.10% of families and 14.70% of the population were below the poverty line, including 18.80% of those under age 18 and 12.40% of those age 65 or over.

== Politics ==
Like all counties in eastern Oregon, the majority of registered voters who are part of a political party in Baker County are members of the Republican Party. Lyndon Johnson in 1964 was the last Democrat to carry the county in a presidential election. Jimmy Carter in 1976 was the closest any Democrat in a presidential election came to carrying Baker County since, when he lost it by only 34 votes. In the 2008 presidential election, 64.37% of Baker County voters voted for Republican John McCain, while 31.95% voted for Democrat Barack Obama and 3.66% of voters either voted for a Third Party candidate or wrote in a candidate. These numbers have changed slightly from the 2004 presidential election, in which 69.2% voted for George W. Bush, while 29% voted for John Kerry, and 1.8% of voters either voted for a Third Party candidate or wrote in a candidate.

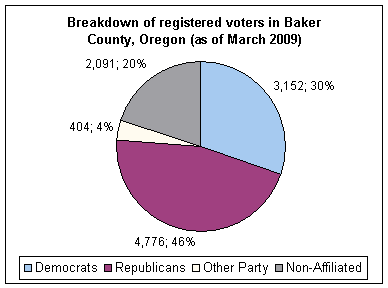

United States presidential election results for Baker County, Oregon
Year	Republican		Democratic		Third party(ies)	
Year	No.	%	No.	%	No.	%
1904	1,990	59.76%	938	28.17%	402	12.07%
1908	1,689	46.79%	1,596	44.21%	325	9.00%
1912	648	17.58%	1,395	37.85%	1,643	44.57%
1916	2,541	37.16%	3,897	56.99%	400	5.85%
1920	3,495	58.63%	2,171	36.42%	295	4.95%
1924	2,803	45.41%	2,004	32.47%	1,365	22.12%
1928	3,721	65.52%	1,861	32.77%	97	1.71%
1932	2,097	31.42%	4,420	66.23%	157	2.35%
1936	1,768	24.72%	4,991	69.79%	392	5.48%
1940	3,101	41.39%	4,353	58.09%	39	0.52%
1944	2,494	44.21%	3,116	55.24%	31	0.55%
1948	2,841	47.04%	3,035	50.25%	164	2.72%
1952	4,253	62.20%	2,562	37.47%	23	0.34%
1956	3,706	51.93%	3,431	48.07%	0	0.00%
1960	3,514	48.46%	3,734	51.50%	3	0.04%
1964	2,670	40.55%	3,903	59.27%	12	0.18%
1968	3,311	52.93%	2,464	39.39%	480	7.67%
1972	3,441	55.32%	2,047	32.91%	732	11.77%
1976	3,340	48.27%	3,306	47.78%	273	3.95%
1980	4,747	59.24%	2,515	31.39%	751	9.37%
1984	5,204	66.62%	2,591	33.17%	17	0.22%
1988	3,696	54.15%	2,896	42.43%	234	3.43%
1992	2,862	38.01%	2,395	31.81%	2,273	30.19%
1996	3,975	51.60%	2,547	33.07%	1,181	15.33%
2000	5,618	68.03%	2,195	26.58%	445	5.39%
2004	6,253	69.22%	2,616	28.96%	165	1.83%
2008	5,650	64.37%	2,805	31.96%	322	3.67%
2012	5,702	67.50%	2,369	28.04%	377	4.46%
2016	6,218	70.83%	1,797	20.47%	764	8.70%
2020	7,352	74.02%	2,346	23.62%	234	2.36%
2024	7,060	72.83%	2,343	24.17%	291	3.00%

== Economy ==
Gold mining was the original impetus for settlement in the area, and at one time the county was the largest gold producer in the Northwest. Gold dredging was conducted with the Sumpter Valley Gold Dredge. With the exhaustion of the gold fields, agriculture, stock raising, logging became the primary economic pursuits. In the last decades of the 20th century, tourism also contributed to the local economy, helped by attractions such as Eagle Cap Wilderness Area, Hells Canyon National Recreation Area, and Anthony Lakes Ski Area. The National Historic Oregon Trail Interpretive Center opened in 1993.

Portions of Season 11 of Discovery's TV show Gold Rush was filmed in Baker County.

== Communities ==
=== Cities and CDPs ===
- Baker City (county seat)
- Greenhorn
- Haines
- Halfway
- Huntington
- Richland
- Sumpter
- Unity

=== Unincorporated communities ===
- Bridgeport
- Brownlee
- Carson
- Dixie
- Durkee
- Encina
- Hereford
- Homestead
- Hutchinson
- Jimtown
- Keating
- Lime
- McEwen
- New Bridge
- Oxbow
- Pine Creek
- Pleasant Valley
- Rye Valley
- Salisbury
- Sparta
- Sunset
- Weatherby
- Whitney
- Wingville

=== Ghost towns ===
- Auburn
- Bourne
- China Town
- Clarksville
- Copperfield
- Cornucopia
- Nelson
- Pocahontas
- Robinette

== Education ==
School districts include:

- Baker School District 5J
- Burnt River School District 30J
- Huntington School District
- North Powder School District 8J
- Pine-Eagle School District 61

Most of Baker County is within the Blue Mountain Community College district, while a portion is in the Treasure Valley Community College district.

== See also ==
- National Register of Historic Places listings in Baker County, Oregon
