= National Register of Historic Places listings in Grant County, Oregon =

Location of Grant County in Oregon

This list presents the full set of buildings, structures, objects, sites, or districts designated on the National Register of Historic Places in Grant County, Oregon, United States, and offers brief descriptive information about each of them. The National Register recognizes places of national, state, or local historic significance across the United States. Out of over 90,000 National Register sites nationwide, Oregon is home to over 2,000, and 9 of those are found partially or wholly in Grant County.

This National Park Service list is complete through NPS recent listings posted March 14, 2025.

== Current listings ==
| | Name on the Register | Image | Date listed | Location | City or town | Description |
|---|---|---|---|---|---|---|
| 1 | Advent Christian Church | Advent Christian Church | June 10, 1992 (#92000665) | 261 W. Main Street; 44°24′59″N 118°57′14″W | John Day | Outstandingly rich Victorian style ornamentation was applied to a classically simple Gothic Revival form in this 1900 church. It is believed that lay minister and carpenter Samuel Bayliss Hope was personally responsible for most of the decorative woodwork, including the unusually late use of hand-planed moldings. |
| 2 | James Cant Ranch Historic District | James Cant Ranch Historic District | June 21, 1984 (#84003000) | Along Oregon Route 19; 44°33′19″N 119°38′41″W | Dayville | |
| 3 | Fremont Powerhouse | Fremont Powerhouse | August 19, 1983 (#83002151) | Umatilla National Forest, along Forest Road 10; 44°47′47″N 118°29′52″W | Granite | |
| 4 | John Day Compound, Supervisor's Warehouse | John Day Compound, Supervisor's Warehouse | April 11, 1986 (#86000836) | 179–199 Government Road; 44°25′07″N 118°57′37″W | John Day | Built by the Civilian Conservation Corps in 1936–1946, this complex is the headquarters for field operations in the Malheur National Forest. It represents that era's shift in the Forest Service's architectural vision toward comprehensive site planning, as well as the Service's policy evolution from custodial superintendence toward active natural resource management. |
| 5 | Kam Wah Chung Company Building | Kam Wah Chung Company Building | March 20, 1973 (#73001575) | John Day City Park; 44°25′07″N 118°57′25″W | John Day | The best known example of a Chinese mercantile and herb store in the United States. It embodies the role of immigrant Chinese in the post-Civil War expansion period of the western United States. |
| 6 | St. Thomas' Episcopal Church | St. Thomas' Episcopal Church | November 21, 1974 (#74001685) | 135 Washington Street; 44°23′17″N 118°56′57″W | Canyon City | |
| 7 | Sumpter Valley Railway Historic District | Sumpter Valley Railway Historic District | August 3, 1987 (#87001065) | Roughly between Baker and Prairie City starting near the McEwen station site and west to the Dixie Pass area (See also Baker County.); 44°32′08″N 118°36′17″W | Prairie City to Baker City | This narrow-gauge railway, built in stages between 1890 and 1910, was intimately connected to the logging industry in the Blue Mountains, and also served the mining, livestock, and agricultural industries. About half of the total roadbed of the railway is included in the historic district, along with several spurs, station sites, sawmill sites, and rolling stock. Although most of the line was abandoned in 1933 and 1946 and rails removed, a small section continues to operate as a heritage railway. |
| 8 | Sumpter Valley Railway Passenger Station | Sumpter Valley Railway Passenger Station | May 5, 1981 (#81000483) | Main and Bridge Streets; 44°27′29″N 118°42′22″W | Prairie City | |
| 9 | Supervisor's House No. 1001 | Supervisor's House No. 1001 | April 11, 1986 (#86000833) | Malheur National Forest; 44°24′57″N 118°57′00″W | John Day | Malheur National Forest supervisor's residence in John Day, Oregon |

== Former listings ==
| | Name on the Register | Image | Date listed | Date removed | Location | City or town | Description |
|---|---|---|---|---|---|---|---|
| 1 | Dayville Hotel | | March 10, 1983 (#83004521) | December 20, 1984 | US 26 | Dayville | Destroyed by fire on June 7, 1984. |
| 2 | Sumpter Valley Railway, Middle Fork (John Day River) Spur | Sumpter Valley Railway, Middle Fork (John Day River) Spur | August 3, 1987 (#87001066) | August 17, 2023 | Along the Middle Fork John Day River; 44°38′47″N 118°40′08″W | Bates to Susanville | |

== See also ==
- National Register of Historic Places listings in Oregon
- Listings in neighboring counties: Baker, Crook, Harney, Malheur, Morrow, Umatilla, Union, Wheeler
- List of National Historic Landmarks in Oregon
- Historic preservation
- History of Oregon
- Lists of Oregon-related topics
