= Advent Christian Church (John Day, Oregon) =

Historic church in Oregon, United States

- U.S. National Register of Historic Places
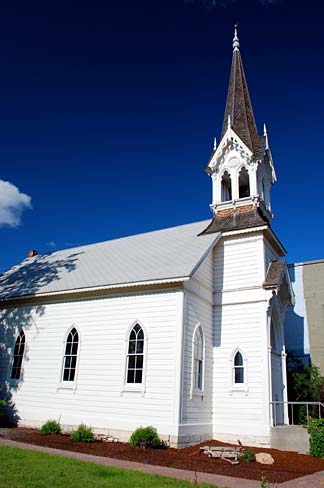
- Advent Christian Church in 2009
- Location: 291 W. Main Street; John Day, Oregon
- Coordinates: 44°24′59″N 118°57′14″W
- Area: 0.1 acres (0.040 ha)
- Built: 1898–1900
- Built by: Samuel Bayliss Hope and congregants
- Architectural style: Carpenter Gothic
- NRHP reference No.: 92000665
- Added to NRHP: June 10, 1992

The Advent Christian Church is a historic church building in John Day, Oregon, United States. Lay minister and carpenter Samuel Bayliss Hope led the members of the local Advent Christian Church congregation in construction starting in 1898 and reaching effective completion in 1900. The church combined the overall Gothic Revival plan and form that remained popular for churches in that period with the rich ornamentation of the Victorian era, especially around the entry and steeple. It is believed that Hope was personally responsible for most of the decorative woodwork on both the interior and exterior, including the latest example of the extensive use of manually planed moldings in a historic building in Oregon.

The Advent Christian Church congregation in John Day became inactive by the 1920s. After several decades of use by other denominations, the church was acquired for historic preservation in 1987. It was added to the National Register of Historic Places in 1992.

== See also ==
- National Register of Historic Places listings in Grant County, Oregon
