= John Day Compound, Supervisor's Warehouse =

- U.S. National Register of Historic Places
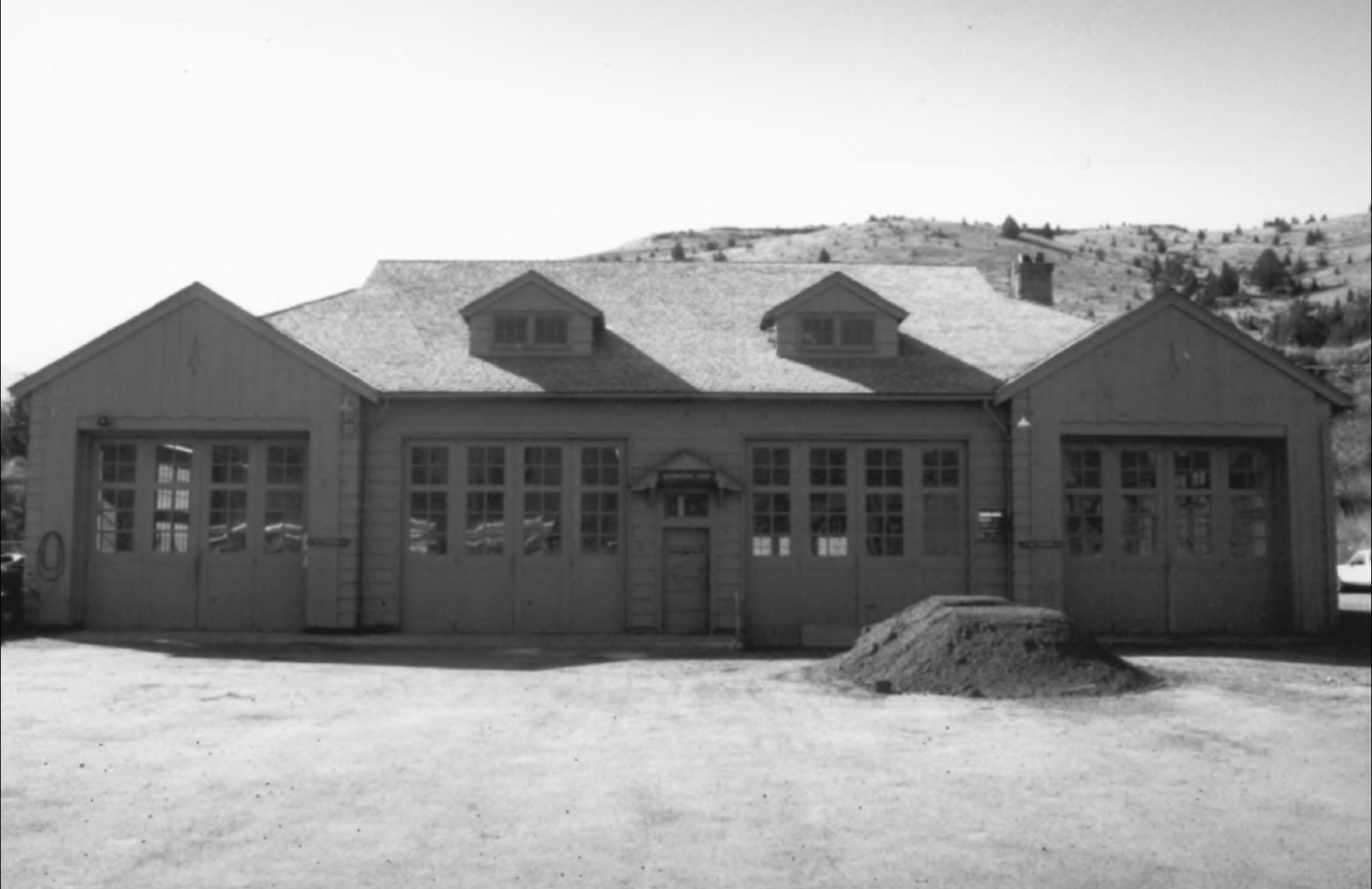
- Main automotive repair shop, 1983

- Location within Oregon Location within the United States
- Location: 179–199 Government Road; John Day, Oregon
- Coordinates: 44°25′06″N 118°57′35″W
- Area: 8.77 acres (3.55 ha)
- Built: 1936–1946
- Built by: Civilian Conservation Corps
- Architect: United States Forest Service, Pacific Northwest Regional Office Architecture Group
- Architectural style: Rustic
- MPS: Depression-Era Buildings TR
- NRHP reference No.: 86000836
- Added to NRHP: April 11, 1986

The John Day Compound, Supervisor's Warehouse is a complex of work buildings, employee residences, and related infrastructure owned an operated by the Malheur National Forest in John Day, Oregon, United States. Built by the Civilian Conservation Corps in 1936–1946, it is the headquarters for field operations in the national forest and is typical of projects carried out by the CCC on behalf of the Forest Service. It represents that era's shift in the Forest Service's architectural vision toward comprehensive site planning, as well as its policy evolution from custodial superintendence of the national forests toward active natural resource management.

The complex was added to the National Register of Historic Places in 1986.

== See also ==
- National Register of Historic Places listings in Grant County, Oregon
