= Lay minister =

Lay minister may refer to:

- Licensed lay minister, sometimes called lay reader, a lay person authorised to conduct certain services and perform other priestly duties in the Anglican church
- A lay minister in other denominations. See lay ministry and laity.
