= KGCD =

KGCD may refer to:

- KGCD (FM), a radio station (90.3 FM) licensed to Wray, Colorado, United States
- Grant County Regional Airport (ICAO code KGCD)
- KLBF, a radio station (89.1 FM) licensed to Lincoln, North Dakota, United States, which held the call sign KGCD from 2008 to 2010
