= Ing Hay =

Chinese immigrant to the United States

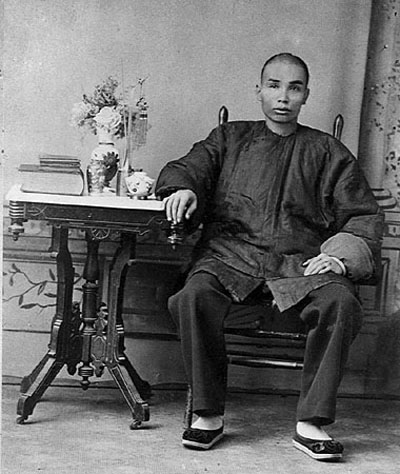
- Born: ca. 1862; Taishan County, Guangdong, Qing Dynasty
- Died: 1952; Portland, Oregon, United States
- Resting place: Restlawn Cemetery, John Day, Oregon
- Occupation: Traditional chinese herbalist
- Years active: ca. 1883–1948

Ing Hay (Chinese: 伍于念; Jyutping: ng5 jyu1 nim6; pinyin: Wǔ Yúniàn; c. 1862 – 1952), also known as Doc Hay, was a doctor of traditional Chinese medicine and an early Chinese American who immigrated to the United States in 1887. He was known in Oregon for treating patients with herbal remedies, and for being a partner in the Kam Wah Chung Company Building.

== Early life ==
Ing Hay Wah was born in Xiaping, a village of Sijiu, Taishan County, Guangdong Province. Initially hoping to find success as a gold miner, Ing entered the United States in 1883 with his father, following his five uncles, and a year after the passage of the Chinese Exclusion Act. He and his father moved to the Chinese community in Walla Walla, Washington in 1885. The pair lived there until his father got homesick and returned to China, in 1887. Ing then moved to John Day, Oregon alone, where he met Lung On. In 1888, Ing and Lung purchased what become known as the Kam Wah Chung Company Building which became their living quarters, store, and doctoring base of operations.

== Life as a doctor ==
Ing came to the United States in 1883 with his father as a laborer, since that was the role offered to most immigrants when they first arrived. The pair moved to Walla Walla, Washington in 1885, before Ing's father returned to China in 1887 and Ing moved to John Day, Oregon alone. When Ing and Lung began their company, the medical system in the West was not yet well-developed and it was almost impossible for people to be healed by the simple western treatments being prescribed, such as drinking more water and resting. Fortunately, Ing had experience with herbal medicine due to his family's practices. Ing also apprenticed with an older Chinese practitioner, Doc Lee in John Day. Ing began by serving other Chinese laborers during the serious pandemic in the 1910s in Oregon and soon came to be known as "Doc Hay." By that time, the region's gold rush had ended, and most of the local Chinese population left. It was then that Ing met Lung On. In 1888, they purchased the Kam Wah Chung Company Building.

Even though Doc Hay did not hold a medical license, his treatment had a perfect success rate. During this era Chinese medicine was widely understood to have great healing capacities, and thus his patients were wide-ranging and ethnically diverse. Some patients that came to see him travelled from as far away as Alaska and Oklahoma.

On the other hand, most of his patients were still poor laborers who participated in the hard work of mining and building railroads. given their difficult economic situations, he treated many of his patients for free or refused to accept their payments. After his death in 1952, he left behind over $23,000 in uncashed clients' checks, including those written during the Great Depression.

== Death ==
Due to Ing Hay's failing health, the Kam Wah Chung ceased operations as an apothecary shop in 1948.

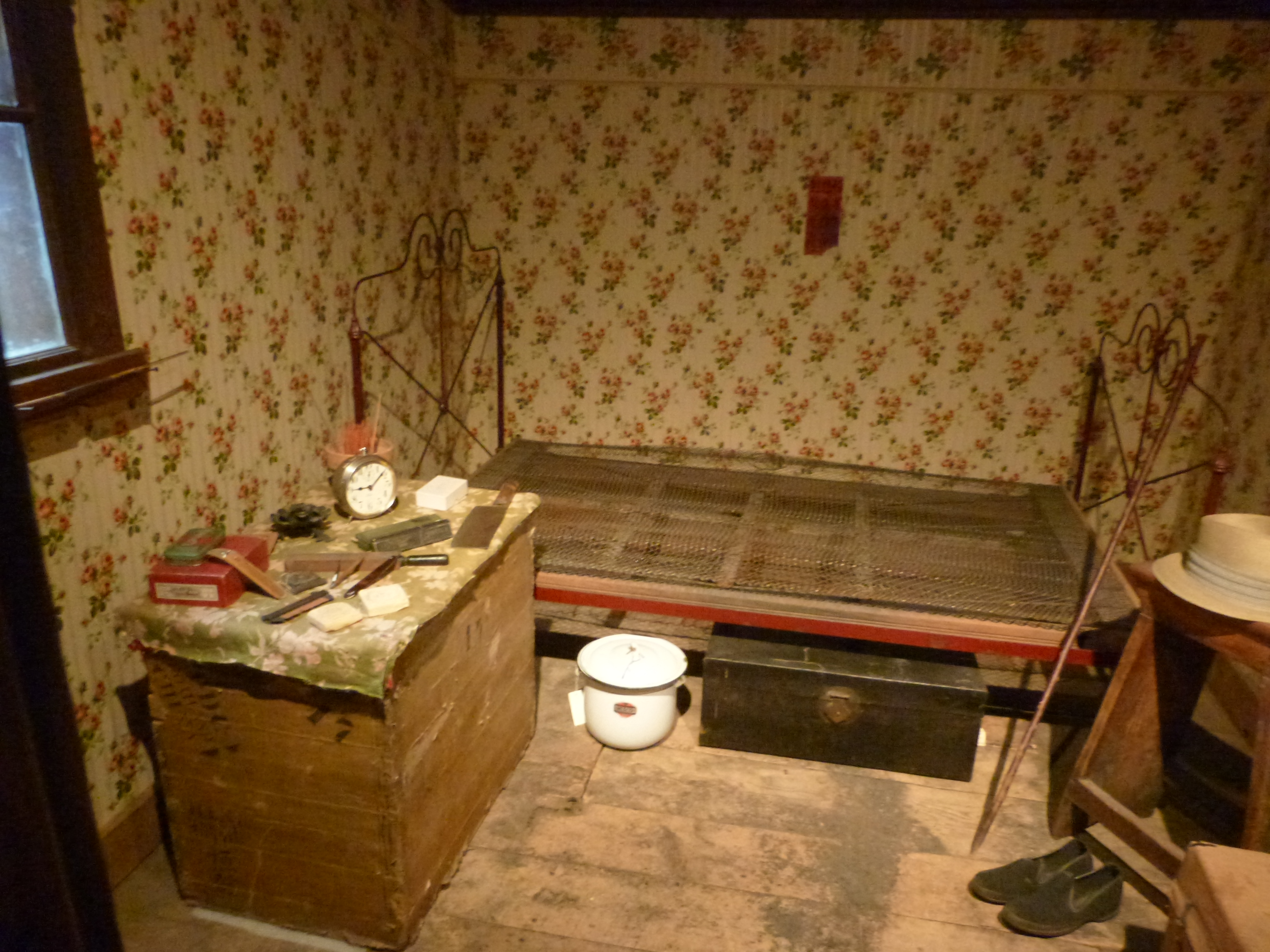
Bedroom in Kam Wah Chung.

During World War II, the supply lines for obtaining Chinese medicines was blocked. Ing did not find the medicine in the United States as efficient as the ones from China due to the regional differences and different climate influences, including the levels of exposure to sunshine. Sources indicate that Ing's failing health and the lack of medicine might have also been related to an eye disorder which affected his sight. In 1951, he fell and hurt his hip, and it was discovered that he also had disease in his lungs. He passed at age 89, in January 1952, in a local hospital.

In 1955, three years after Doc Hay's death, his nephew, Bob Wah, deeded the Kam Wah Chung and Company building and its contents to the City of John Day to be used as a cultural museum. The Kam Wah Chung has since become a museum, called the "Kam Wah Chung & Co. Museum" of the "Kam Wah Chung Company Building." The museum has been closed once and reopened in 1973. It was added to the National Register of Historic Places in 1973; the store opened as a museum in 1975. In 2005, The Kam Wah Chung Company site was named a National Historic Landmark.
