= Lung On =

Chinese scholar and businessman

- 梁光榮
- Oregon businessman Lung On
- Born: Liang Guanying; 1863; Guangdong Providence, China
- Died: December 1940 (aged 76–77); John Day, Oregon
- Burial place: Restlawn Cemetery, John Day, Oregon
- Other name: Leon
- Occupation: Businessman
- Years active: 1888-1940
- Known for: Partner in Kum Wah Chung

Lung On (1863–1940) was a Chinese scholar, and businessman who immigrated to Oregon in the United States. He opened the apothecary store, Kam Wah Chung, alongside his partner, Ing "Doc" Hay. On became an established figure in the community of John Day, Oregon. He represented Chinese laborers as an interpreter and translator since he was fluent in both Chinese and English. On established businesses with investments in labor, mining, real estate, and automobile dealership. He was well-respected in his community and remained in John Day, Oregon until his death in 1940.

== Early life ==
Lung On (Leon, Chinese: 梁光榮; Jyutping: loeng4 gwong1 wing4; pinyin: Liáng Guāngróng) was born in Guangdong Providence, China in 1863. Coming from a wealthy family he studied to be a Chinese scholar, becoming fluent in English and Chinese. He would depart to the United States, leaving his family, a wife and daughter, behind in China. He never returned. On initially immigrated to Oregon as a miner, being quoted in a newspaper as saying he was there "for the purpose of getting gold out of the earth." He arrived in San Francisco in 1882, around the time of the enactment of the Chinese Exclusion Act, that limited the entering of Chinese immigrants into the country. On was able to enter on an exception for teachers and merchants, given his scholarly and business background. He would travel to John Day, Oregon in 1887, where he eventually meet Ing Hay, a Chinese herbalist. On and Hay become business partners in an apothecary store, Kam Wah Chung in 1888.

== Life in John Day, Oregon ==
=== Kam Wah Chung Co. and investments ===
On was in charged of the Kum Wah Chung's business' affairs. The store had many functions that catered to the needs of the community. One of these functions was a post office for those who wanted to send money and letters to their families in China. Lung On would help translate and write letters for senders who couldn't on their own. In the store after the two owners had passed, many letters were found, including letters from On's family in China. In those letters his family begged for his return to China.

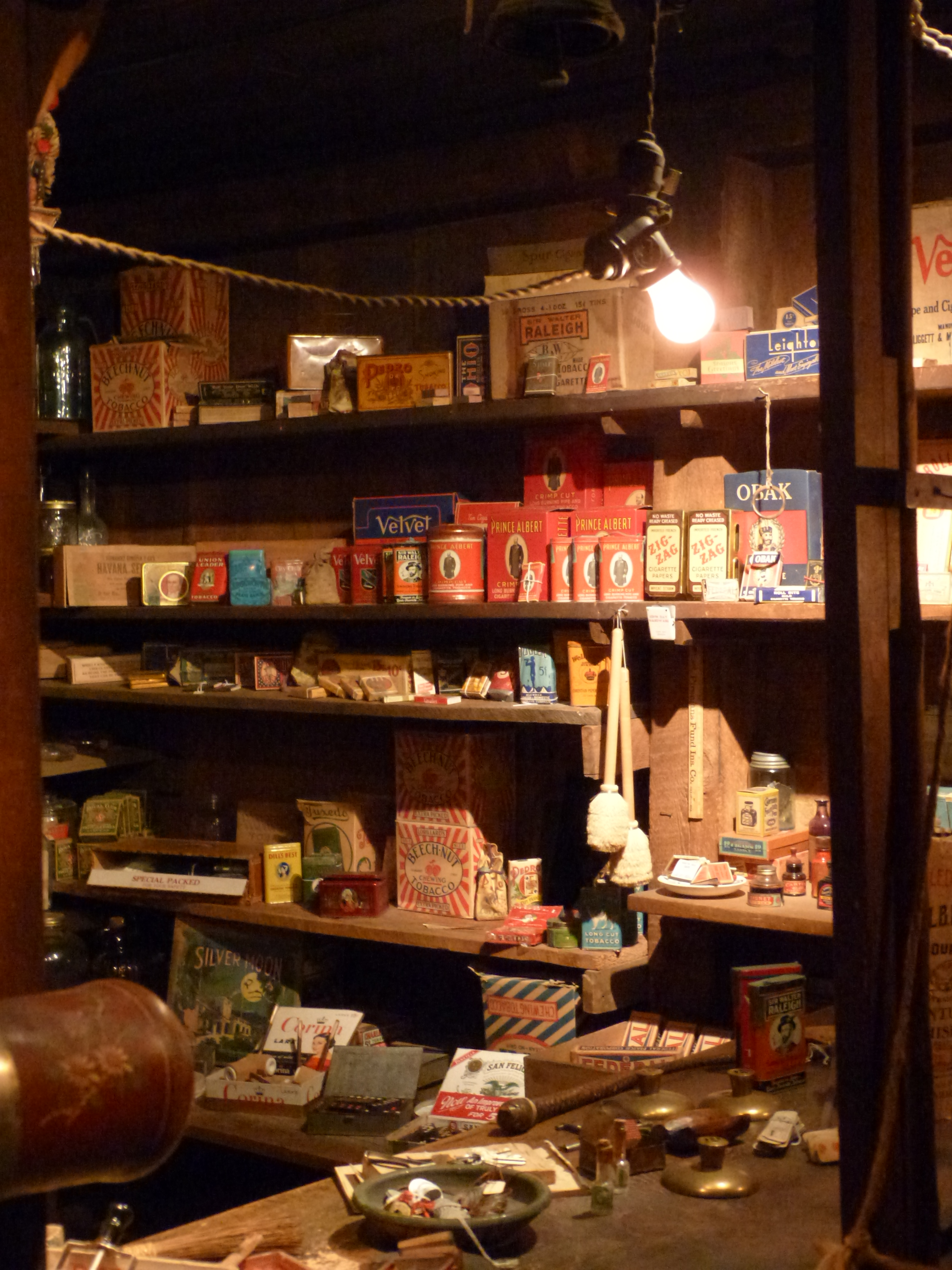
Lung On's general store in Kam Wah Chung

The store also functioning as an apothecary and general store which sold Chinese goods and medicinal herbs (for Hay's practice).

On being a businessman, invested into many ventures, such as owning mines and land. During that time in Oregon there was a lot of anti-Asian sentiment, On employed Chinese laborers for the mines and rented out property, procuring work and space for workers. When circumstances lead to the decline of population in John Day, many left the city in search of other places, while On and Hay stayed to run their store and serve the community.

During a search of the store in April 1905 On and two other men were arrested for drug procession. They were ordered to leave John Day but Lung On stayed and pleaded not guilty. The attorney that represented On stated that the arrest was unlawful and went against a citizen's right as the search and seizure of the premise was without a warrant or reason for suspicion.

On would then open the first automobile dealership and service station in Eastern Oregon, called Tourist Garage. He would continue to operate the business till he died in 1940.

=== Community and leadership ===
When the mines in John Day were in decline, laborers were in need of jobs. On employed those who couldn't find work in the mines and found work in agriculture ventures. Along with translating and writing letters, he acted as interpreter and translators on behalf of Chinese laborers when it came to navigating local law and discrimination against the Chinese. An example of when his skill was used was in January 1892 where he acted as an interpreter for a Chinese person accused of murder.

He and Hay were significant helpers when it came to the health of the community. On would deliver medicine and herbs to those around the town who were patients of Hay and import said herbs from China and stock them into their store. Both were prominent during the early 1920s when breaks of Influenza spread across labor force in John Day, during the creation of the road between Grant County and Portland. Doc Hay and On would deliver medicine and herbs to the laborers, who, with their help, were able to complete the road in February 1920.

=== Death and museum ===
Lung On would die at the age of 78 in December 1940 in John Day, Oregon. His remains were buried at Restlawn Cemetery in John Day. Ing Hay was buried beside him when he passed in 1948. The estate of the property of Kam Wah Chung would be split with Ing Hay and the funds would've gone to On's family in China but it was never able to leave. The store would continue to run after his death until Hay's death in 1948. The store eventually became property of the state and remained untouched until 1988 when it was turned into a historical museum.

Lung On was remembered as a very kind and intelligent man, resourceful, helpful and respected amongst the community.

== Bibliography ==
- Yung, Chang, G. H., & Lai, H. M. (2006). Chinese American voices : from the gold rush to the present. University of California Press.
- Dreams of the West : a history of the Chinese in Oregon, 1850–1950 = Elegang hua ren fen dou shi, 1850–1950. (2007). Ooligan Press.
- Chen, Chia-lin, "A gold dream in the Blue Mountains : a study of the Chinese immigrants in the John Day area, Oregon, 1870–1910" (1972). Dissertations and Theses. Paper 962.
- Campbell, Edward, and Cain Allen. n.d. "Lung On." Oregon History Project. Accessed 23 March 2023. https://www.oregonhistoryproject.org/articles/historical-records/lung-on/#.ZBvusHbMK3C.
- Bodendorfer, J. (28 September 2015). Oregon Historical Photo: Lung On With Sedan. Oregon Public Broadcasting. Retrieved 10 March 2023, from https://www.opb.org/artsandlife/article/oregon-historical-photo-lung-on-with-sedan/
- Friends Of Kam Wah Chung. (n.d.). Lung On. Friends of Kam Wah Chung. Retrieved 10 March 2023, from https://friendsofkamwahchung.com/history/lung-on/
- Varon, Jodi. 2022. “Lung On (1863–1940).” The Oregon Encyclopedia. https://www.oregonencyclopedia.org/articles/lung_on_1863_1940_/#.ZAuEW3bMK3C.
- Chen, Yemeng,. Doc Hay: A Chinese Herbalist Combating the 1918–1919 Influenza Pandemic in America. Chinese Medicine and Culture 3(3):p 133–137, Jul–Sep 2020. | doi:10.4103/CMAC.CMAC_24_20
- Swindler, Samantha. 2022. “Kam Wah Chung in John Day offers glimpse of once-thriving Chinatown in eastern Oregon.” Here is Oregon. https://www.hereisoregon.com/places/2022/09/kam-wah-chung-in-john-day-offers-glimpse-of-once-thriving-chinatown-in-eastern-oregon.html.
