= Sumpter Valley Railway Passenger Station =

- U.S. National Register of Historic Places
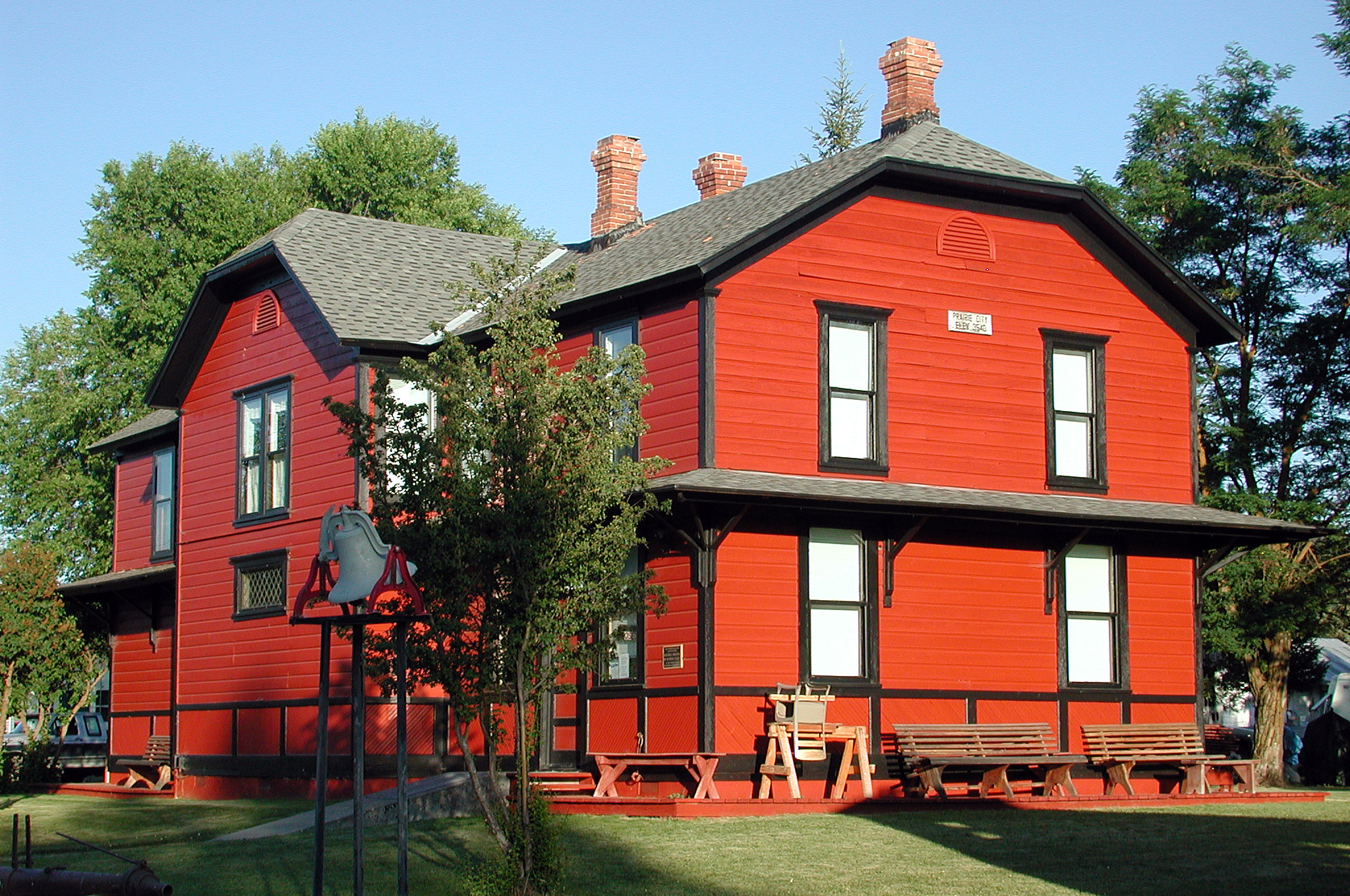
- Former station, home of DeWitt Museum
- Location: Depot Park, South Main Street and South Bridge Street
- Nearest city: Prairie City, Oregon
- Coordinates: 44°27′29″N 118°42′23″W
- Built: 1910
- Architectural style: Stick/Queen Anne
- NRHP reference No.: 81000483
- Added to NRHP: May 5, 1981

Sumpter Valley Railway Passenger Station was the westernmost station on the Sumpter Valley Railway, which ran 80 miles (130 km) from Baker City to Prairie City in the U.S. state of Oregon. The line reached Prairie City in 1910 but was abandoned in 1933, and the station became a private dwelling. Since 1984, the renovated station has housed the collections of the DeWitt Museum, including railway artifacts from the late 19th and early 20th centuries.

== History ==
Incorporated in 1890, the narrow gauge railway's initial purpose was to haul logs from forests near Baker City in Baker County to a sawmill in South Baker City. By 1891, the line had reached McEwen, 22 miles (35 km) to the west, and the railroad began offering passenger and freight service. To reach uncut forests further west, the company extended the line in stages. It reached Sumpter in 1896 and continued southwestward to Whitney, Tipton, Austin and Bates. By 1910, it arrived in Prairie City, a ranching and mining community on the John Day River in Grant County.

Ten years later, the railway began losing business to automobiles and trucks, and in 1933 the 20 miles (32 km) of track between Prairie City and Bates were abandoned. From then until 1973, the Prairie City Depot was used as a dwelling. Thereafter, the Sumpter Valley Depot Restoration Committee renovated the structure, which was added to the National Register of Historic Places in 1981.

== DeWitt Museum ==
The City of Prairie City, assuming management of the building in 1984, used it to house the DeWitt Museum. Its collections include lanterns, lights, and other railway artifacts, and photographs of train wrecks and of life along the rail line. Other parts of the museum house a collection of rocks and minerals, family photo albums, and mining artifacts from Grant County at the turn of the 20th century.

== See also ==
- List of Oregon railroads
- National Register of Historic Places listings in Oregon
- List of museums in Oregon
- List of Oregon's Most Endangered Places
