= Sumpter Valley Railway, Middle Fork (John Day River) Spur =

- Formerly listed on the U.S. National Register of Historic Places
- U.S. Historic district
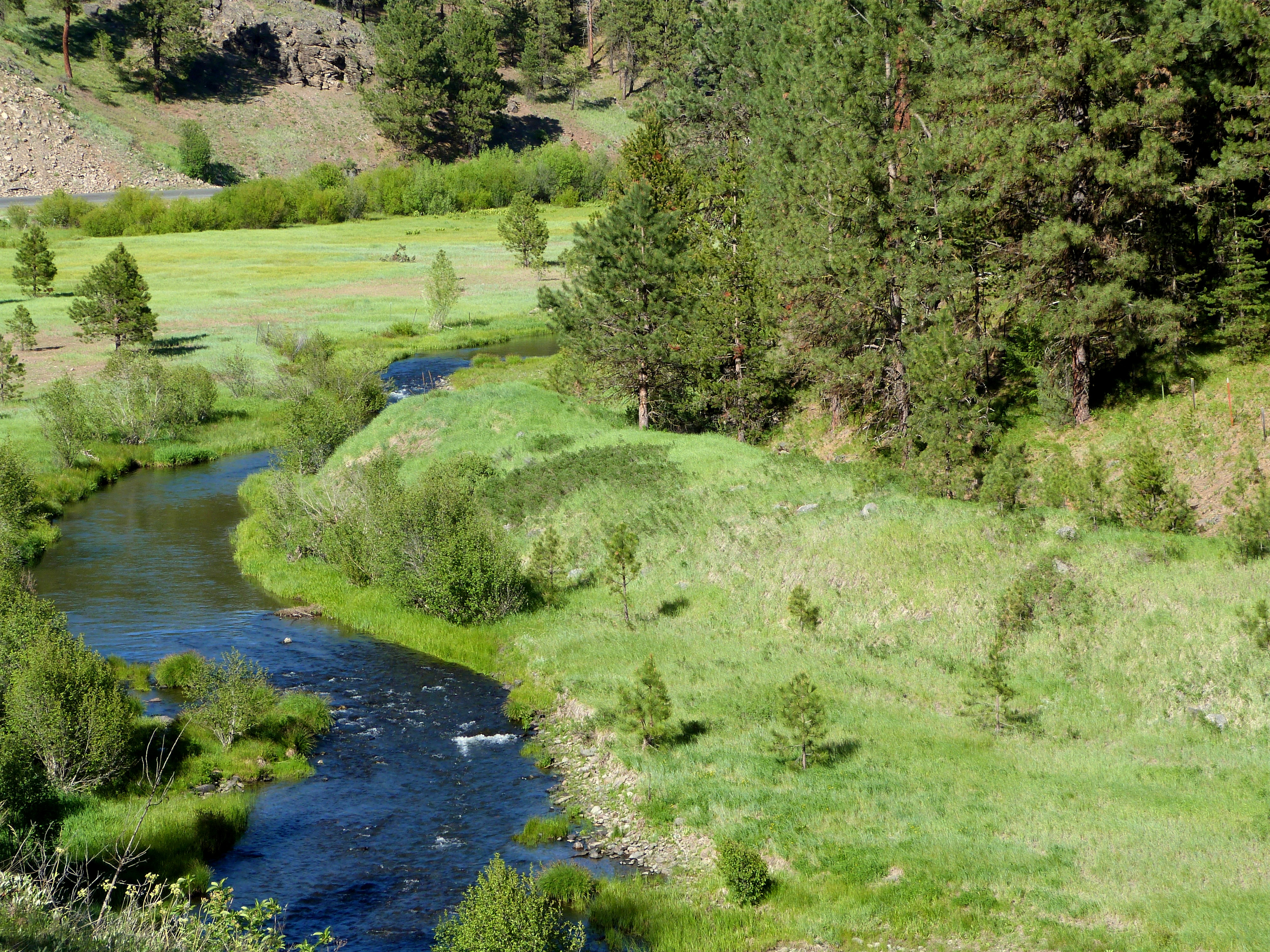
- Remnant of the grade of the Middle Fork Spur
- Nearest city: Bates, Oregon
- Area: 196.3 acres (79.4 ha)
- Built: 1916
- Architect: West, Joseph A.
- NRHP reference No.: 87001066

Significant dates
- Added to NRHP: August 3, 1987
- Removed from NRHP: August 17, 2023

The Sumpter Valley Railway, Middle Fork (John Day River) Spur, near Bates, Oregon, was built in 1916. Also known as the Oregon Lumber Company Railroad, it was designed by engineer Joseph A. West. A linear historic district including 16.2 miles out of 23 original miles on the spur, from near Bates, Oregon, to the Mitchell Tract, historic end of the railroad, was listed on the National Register of Historic Places in 1987. The listing included three contributing structures: the roadbed, the Davis Creek Bridge, and a water tower at Big Boulder Creek.

The National Register's NRIS database recorded the name as Sumpter Valley Railway, Middle Fork-John Day River, which seems garbled, but is echoed in various internet webpages. The property was delisted in 2023.
