= Prairie City, Oregon =

- City
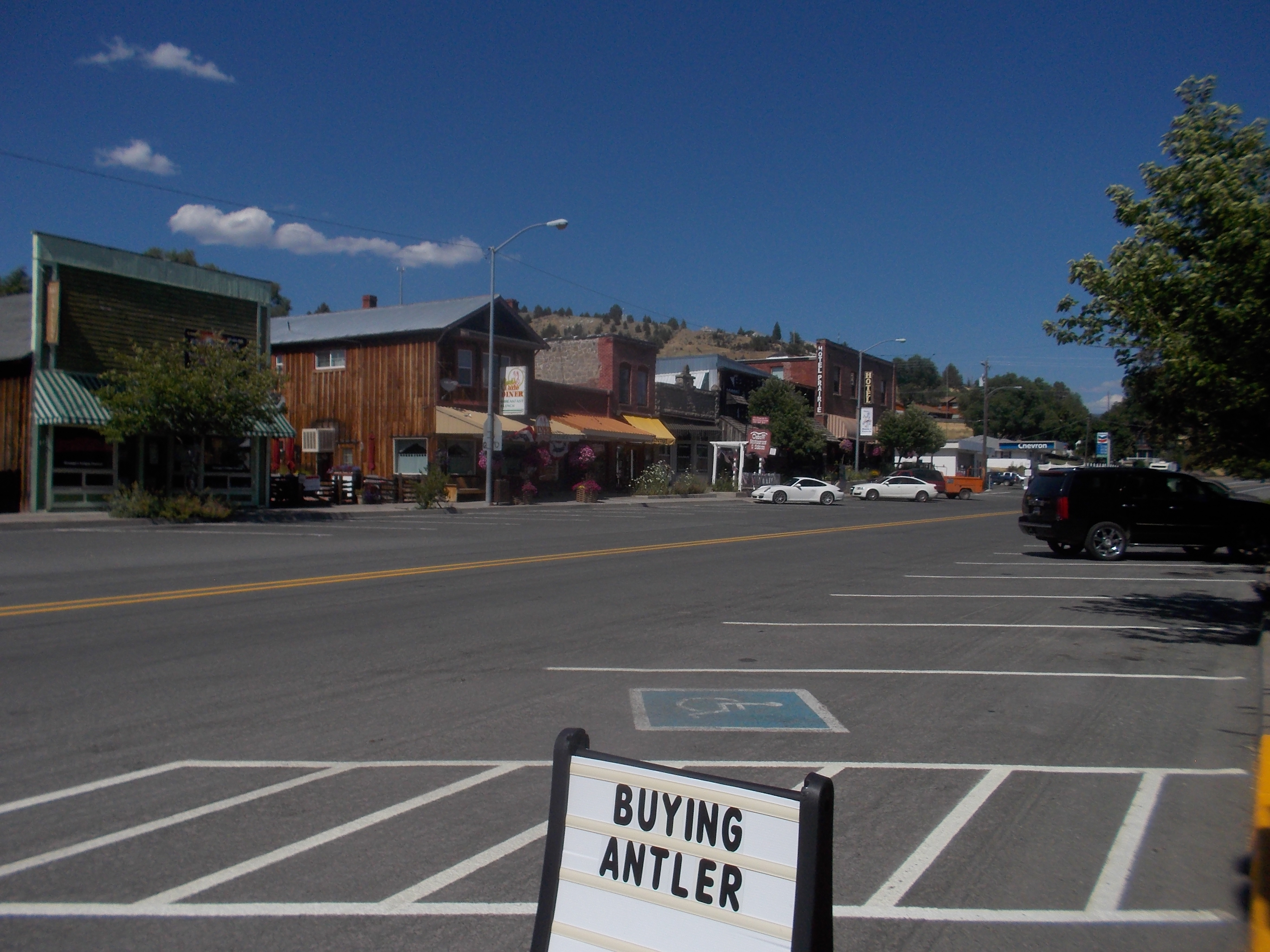
- Downtown Prairie City

- Location in Oregon
- Coordinates: 44°27′40″N 118°42′34″W
- Country: United States
- State: Oregon
- County: Grant
- Incorporated: 1891

Government
  - Mayor: Jim Hamsher

Area
  - Total: 0.99 sq mi (2.57 km^{2})
  - Land: 0.99 sq mi (2.57 km^{2})
  - Water: 0 sq mi (0.00 km^{2})
- Elevation: 3,537 ft (1,078 m)

Population (2020)
  - Total: 841
  - Density: 848.1/sq mi (327.45/km^{2})
- Time zone: UTC-8 (Pacific)
  - Summer (DST): UTC-7 (Pacific)
- ZIP code: 97869
- Area code: 541
- FIPS code: 41-59650
- GNIS feature ID: 2411484
- Website: www.prairiecityoregon.com

Prairie City is a city in Grant County, Oregon, United States. As of the 2020 census, Prairie City had a population of 841. The community was incorporated by the Oregon Legislative Assembly on February 23, 1891.

== History ==
Prairie City grew out of the former mining camp of Dixie, established in 1862 about 3 miles (5 km) up Dixie Creek from the John Day River. Prairie City, at the mouth of the creek, was chosen after placer mining rendered Dixie unsuitable for a townsite. The new city's post office was established in 1870 with Jules Le Bret as postmaster.

A narrow gauge line, the Sumpter Valley Railway (SVR), ran 80 miles (130 km) from Baker City west to Sumpter and on to its western terminus at Prairie City, which it reached in 1907. It carried passengers as well as freight shipped by ranchers, mining interests, and timber companies until its piecemeal abandonment in the 1930s. In the 21st century, a heritage railway operates on a segment of the original line between Sumpter and McEwen.

== Geography ==
Prairie City is in eastern Oregon at the upper end of the John Day River valley. It is about 50 miles (80 km) southwest of Baker City by highway and 13 miles (21 km) east of John Day along U.S. Route 26 in Grant County. Strawberry Mountain in the Strawberry Mountain Wilderness of the Malheur National Forest is directly south of the city.

According to the United States Census Bureau, the city has a total area of 0.99 square miles (2.56 km^{2}), all land.

== Demographics ==
Historical population
Census	Pop.	Note	%±
1870	100		—
1880	235		135.0%
1890	222		−5.5%
1900	213		−4.1%
1910	348		63.4%
1920	643		84.8%
1930	438		−31.9%
1940	647		47.7%
1950	822		27.0%
1960	801		−2.6%
1970	867		8.2%
1980	1,106		27.6%
1990	1,117		1.0%
2000	1,080		−3.3%
2010	909		−15.8%
2020	841		−7.5%

=== 2020 census ===
As of the 2020 census, Prairie City had a population of 841. The median age was 55.5 years. 17.5% of residents were under the age of 18 and 34.4% of residents were 65 years of age or older. For every 100 females there were 95.1 males, and for every 100 females age 18 and over there were 92.8 males age 18 and over.

0% of residents lived in urban areas, while 100.0% lived in rural areas.

There were 398 households in Prairie City, of which 20.1% had children under the age of 18 living in them. Of all households, 46.0% were married-couple households, 23.1% were households with a male householder and no spouse or partner present, and 23.4% were households with a female householder and no spouse or partner present. About 32.9% of all households were made up of individuals and 20.6% had someone living alone who was 65 years of age or older.

There were 443 housing units, of which 10.2% were vacant. Among occupied housing units, 75.1% were owner-occupied and 24.9% were renter-occupied. The homeowner vacancy rate was 1.6% and the rental vacancy rate was 2.9%.

Racial composition as of the 2020 census
Race	Number	Percent
White	752	89.4%
Black or African American	0	0%
American Indian and Alaska Native	8	1.0%
Asian	3	0.4%
Native Hawaiian and Other Pacific Islander	1	0.1%
Some other race	1	0.1%
Two or more races	76	9.0%
Hispanic or Latino (of any race)	38	4.5%

=== 2010 census ===
As of the census of 2010, there were 909 people, 402 households, and 257 families residing in the city. The population density was 918.2 inhabitants per square mile (354.5/km^{2}). There were 476 housing units at an average density of 480.8 per square mile (185.6/km^{2}). The racial makeup of the city was 94.6% White, 0.1% African American, 1.3% Native American, 0.1% Asian, 0.2% Pacific Islander, 0.3% from other races, and 3.3% from two or more races. Hispanic or Latino of any race were 3.1% of the population.

There were 402 households, of which 24.9% had children under the age of 18 living with them, 53.7% were married couples living together, 7.2% had a female householder with no husband present, 3.0% had a male householder with no wife present, and 36.1% were non-families. 32.1% of all households were made up of individuals, and 17% had someone living alone who was 65 years of age or older. The average household size was 2.18 and the average family size was 2.69.

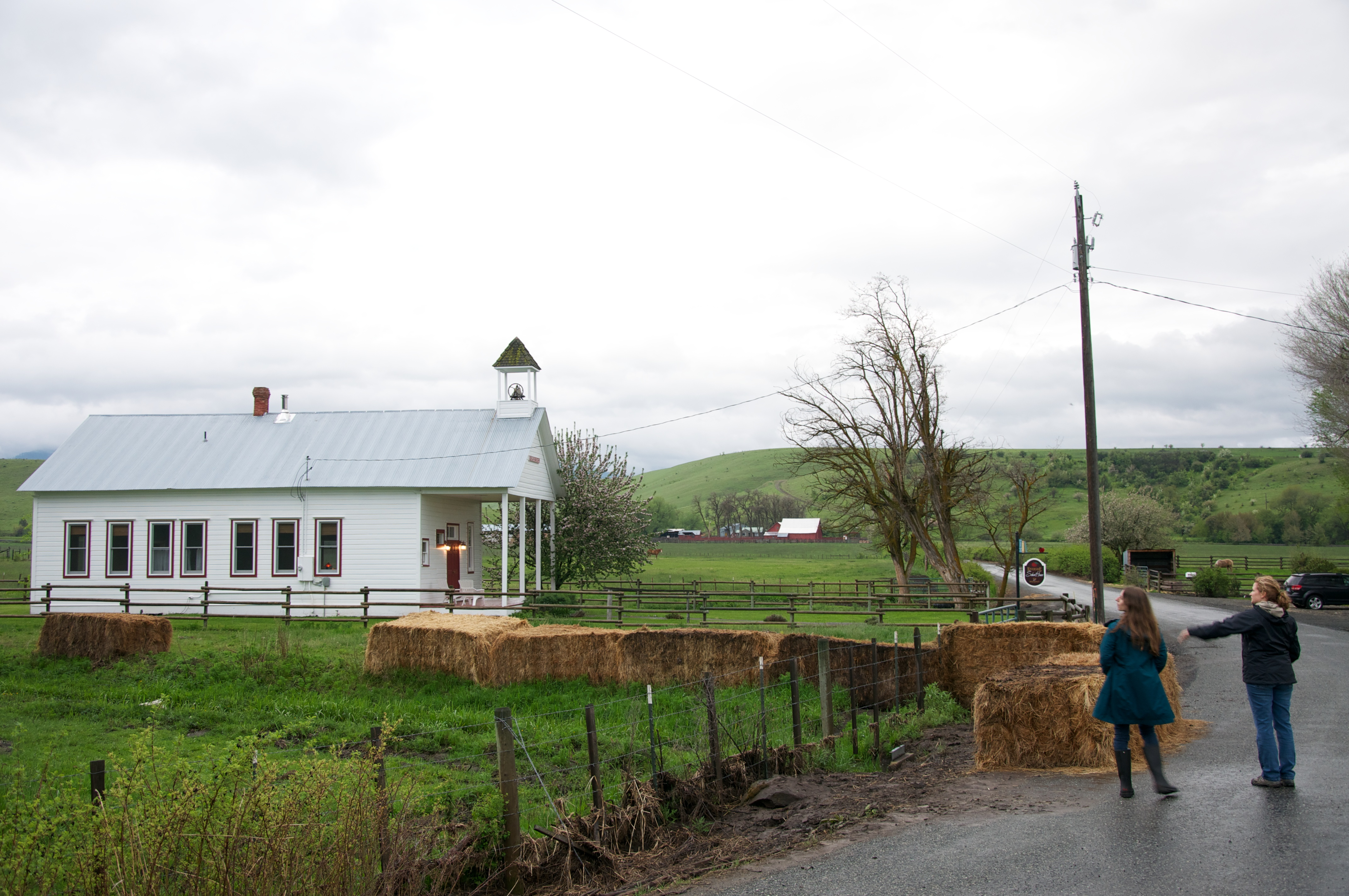
The Riverside Schoolhouse Bed & Breakfast in Prairie City

The median age in the city was 49.8 years. 20.4% of residents were under the age of 18; 5% were between the ages of 18 and 24; 18.9% were from 25 to 44; 30.2% were from 45 to 64; and 25.6% were 65 years of age or older. The gender makeup of the city was 49.3% male and 50.7% female.

=== 2000 census ===
At the census of 2000, the median income for a household in the city was $31,354, and the median income for a family was $35,893. Males had a median income of $31,771 versus $24,500 for females. The per capita income for the city was $16,278. About 10.6% of families and 14.7% of the population were below the poverty line, including 17.4% of those under age 18 and 9.4% of those age 65 or over.

== Economy ==
The economy includes ranching, retail stores, a wood-fueled power plant, and public services. Prairie Wood Products, a mill that produces fine-grained studs from timber from nearby forests, is in Prairie City.

== Education and culture ==
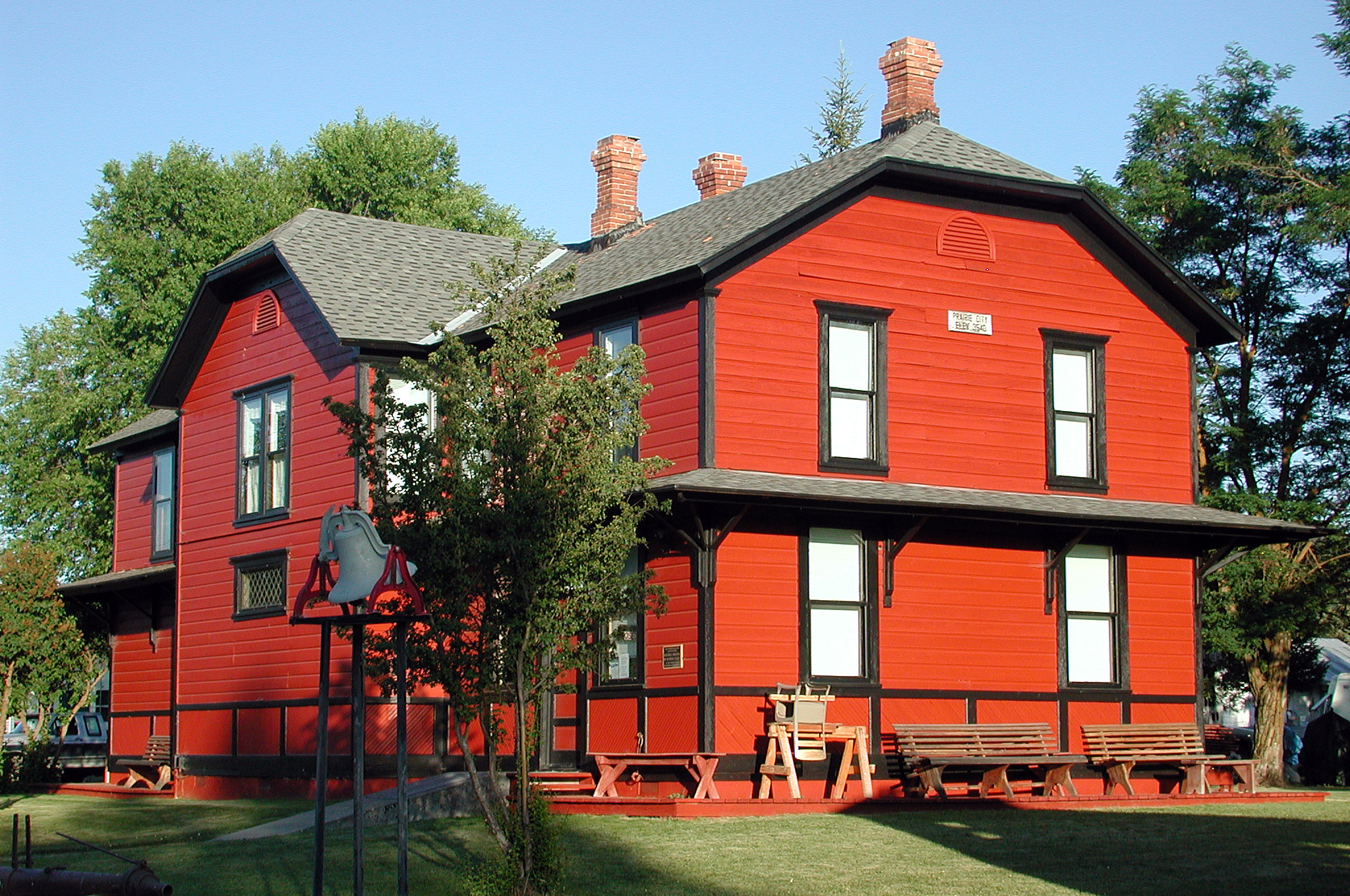
Former railway depot

Prairie City School in Prairie City serves children from kindergarten through 12th grade.

Architectural features in Prairie City include historic stone buildings and the former railway depot. The ground floor of the depot consists of a waiting room, railway station agent's office, baggage room, and freight office. The second floor, once the home of the station agent and his family, houses the Dewitt Museum, with pioneer artifacts, tools, furniture, and memorabilia, as well as rocks and minerals from the surrounding area. The depot was listed on the National Register of Historic Places in 1976.

Bates State Park, built on the site of a former lumber mill, is northeast of Prairie City at Bates, near Austin Junction at the intersection of U.S. Route 26 and Oregon Route 7.
