= Kam Wah Chung & Co. Museum =

Chinese culture museum in Oregon, US

Kam Wah Chung Heritage Site 金華昌藥店歷史地點
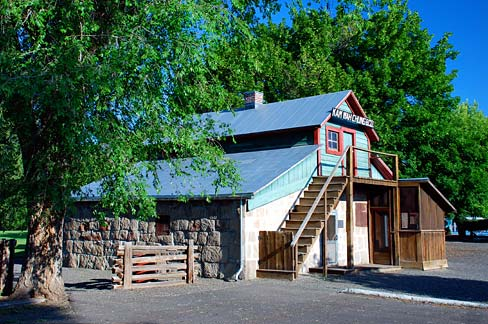
- Kam Wah Chung building

- Location within Oregon Location within the United States
- Type: Public, state
- Location: Grant County, Oregon
- Nearest city: John Day
- Coordinates: 44°25′07″N 118°57′25″W
- Area: 0.42 acres (0.17 ha)
- Operator: Oregon Parks and Recreation Department
- Kam Wah Chung Company Building
- U.S. National Register of Historic Places
- U.S. National Historic Landmark
- Built: 1866
- NRHP reference No.: 73001575

Significant dates
- Added to NRHP: March 20, 1973
- Designated NHL: September 20, 2005

Kam Wah Chung Heritage Site
- Chinese: 金華昌藥店歷史地點
- Literal meaning: Kam Wah Chung Pharmacy Historic Site
Transcriptions
Standard Mandarin
- Hanyu Pinyin: Jīnhuáchāng yàodiàn lìshǐ dìdiǎn
Yue: Cantonese
- Jyutping: gam1 waa4 coeng1 joek6 dim3 lik6 si2 dei6 dim2

The Kam Wah Chung & Co. Museum, also known as Kam Wah Chung Company Building, is a state park and a National Historic Landmark that preserves early Chinese culture in John Day in the U.S. state of Oregon. Built in the 1865 by George Hazeltine as a supply depot or stagecoach stop along the Dalles-Canyon City wagon road., it is the best-preserved example of a Chinese herbal apothecary and mercantile establishment dating to the post-Civil War period of growth in the Western United States.

== History ==
The Kam Wah Chung (Chinese: 金華昌; Jyutping: gam1 waa4 coeng1) Company Building was built along a wagon road later known as The Dalles Military Road, possibly as a trading post serving placer mining operations on Canyon Creek. By 1878, it was under lease to the Kam Wah Chung Company, which was purchased in 1887 by the partnership of Ing Hay (known also as "Doc Hay") (Chinese: 伍于念; Jyutping: ng5 jyu1 nim6) and Lung On (Chinese: 梁光榮; Jyutping: loeng4 gwong1 wing4), Chinese immigrants from Canton.

The building remained abandoned after Ing Hay died in 1952. He asked that the building be deeded to the city of John Day with the provision it be turned into a museum. His wish, and the ownership of the building, were forgotten until 1967. While surveying for a new park the city discovered its ownership of the building and began to restore it as it was in the 1940s. The city also has custody of many of the company's records and personal documents relating to the proprietors.

Currently the Kam Wah Chung & Co. Museum contains one of the most extensive collections of materials from the century-long influx of Chinese immigrants in the American West. It was listed on the National Register of Historic Places in 1973 and designated a National Historic Landmark by the Secretary of the Interior in 2005.

The museum received particular attention from Oregon First Lady Mary Oberst, wife of Governor Ted Kulongoski, who helped raise $1.5 million in private funds to renovate the building into a state park. The renovation began in November 2006 and was re-opened in August 2007. The renovated museum's grand re-opening was celebrated on May 3, 2008.

== See also ==
- List of Oregon state parks
- List of National Historic Landmarks in Oregon
- National Register of Historic Places listings in Grant County, Oregon
