= Bates State Park =

State park in Oregon, United States

- Location within Oregon Location within the United States
- Interactive map of Bates State Park
- Type: Public, state
- Location: Grant County, Oregon, USA
- Nearest city: Prairie City
- Coordinates: 44°35′33″N 118°30′35″W
- Area: 131 acres (53 ha)
- Opened: September 20, 2011
- Operator: Oregon Parks and Recreation Department
- Open: May to October (weather permitting)

Bates State Park is a 131-acre (53 ha) state park in Grant County, Oregon, USA, near Prairie City. The park includes hiking trails, primitive RV and tent campsites, and a day use area for hikers and bicyclists.

== History ==
The park is located on the Middle Fork John Day River, on the site of a lumber mill that closed in 1975. The company town for the mill, Bates, formerly had a population of about 400 on the site, but when the mill closed, the town slowly depopulated. The mill pond, one of the few remaining landmarks from the lumber mill era, is a central feature of the new park.

In 2008, the Oregon Parks and Recreation Department purchased the property from the county for $407,000 and spent another $900,000 in preparing the park for its opening in September 2011. Several matching grants were used to continue to develop and maintain the park.

== Features ==
Located in the Blue Mountains, Bates State Park sits at 4,070 feet (1,240 m) above sea-level. The park contains 28 primitive campsites for tents and RVs. In addition, there is a day use area for hikers and bicyclists, who use the area as part of the TransAmerica bicycle trail. The day use area contains locations for picnicking and several miles of hiking trails are available. Interpretive panels describing the history of the town and the mill era are on display. The park is open from May to October.

== See also ==
- List of Oregon state parks
