= Dixie, Grant County, Oregon =

Coordinates: 44.533214°N 118.577446°W

Dixie is an unincorporated historic community in Grant County, Oregon, United States. It was a station on the Sumpter Valley Railway near Dixie Summit. The station was named for Dixie Creek, a tributary of the John Day River near Prairie City. The creek was named for the many gold miners from the U.S. South (nicknamed "Dixie") who worked claims on the creek.
