= Fremont Powerhouse =

- U.S. National Register of Historic Places
- U.S. Historic district
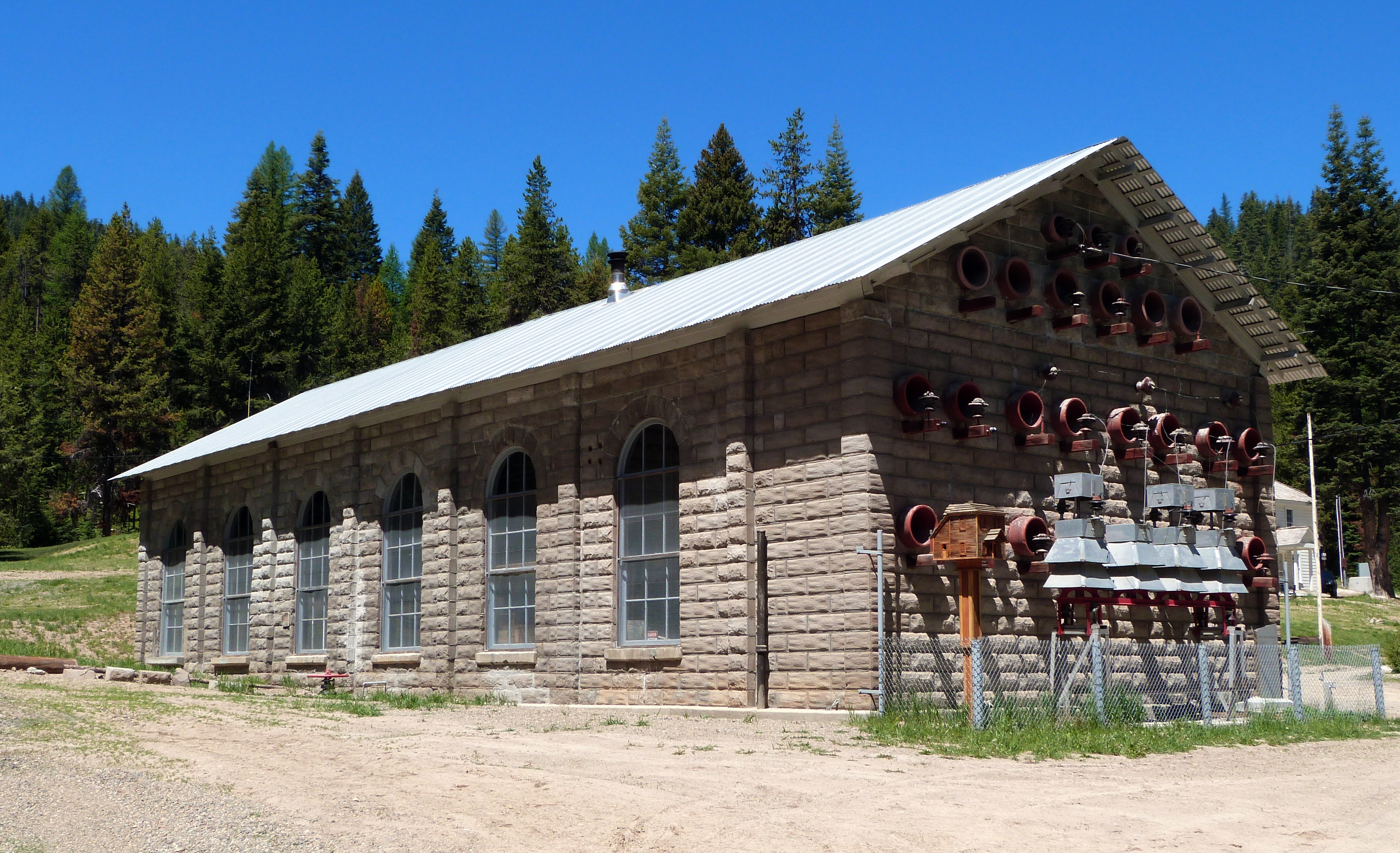
- The building's exterior in 2013

- Location within Oregon Location within the United States
- Nearest city: Granite, Oregon
- Coordinates: 44°47′46.6″N 118°29′52″W
- Area: 86.3 acres (34.9 ha)
- Built: 1908
- Engineer: Cummings, E. W.
- Architectural style: Richardsonian Romanesque
- NRHP reference No.: 83002151
- Added to NRHP: August 19, 1983

The Fremont Powerhouse is a power plant located in the Umatilla National Forest in Grant County, west of Granite, Oregon, United States.

== History ==
The Fremont Powerhouse used to power to the Red Boy Mine, creating electricity from water supplied by Olive Lake. Eastern Oregon Power and Light acquired the plant in 1911. In 1940 the plant transferred to California-Pacific Utilities Co.; the company operated Fremont until it was shut down in October 1967. The plant stopped generating electricity but remained a tourist attraction, drawing thousands of visitors. In 1993, the building's roof collapsed. In 1999, a former Fremont employee and members of the National Guard of the United States rebuilt much of the building. Fremont was re-dedicated on July 24, 2001. Umatilla National Forest, which owns the structure, received an award from the Oregon State Historic Preservation Office.

== See also ==
- National Register of Historic Places listings in Grant County, Oregon
