= Canyon City, Oregon =

- City
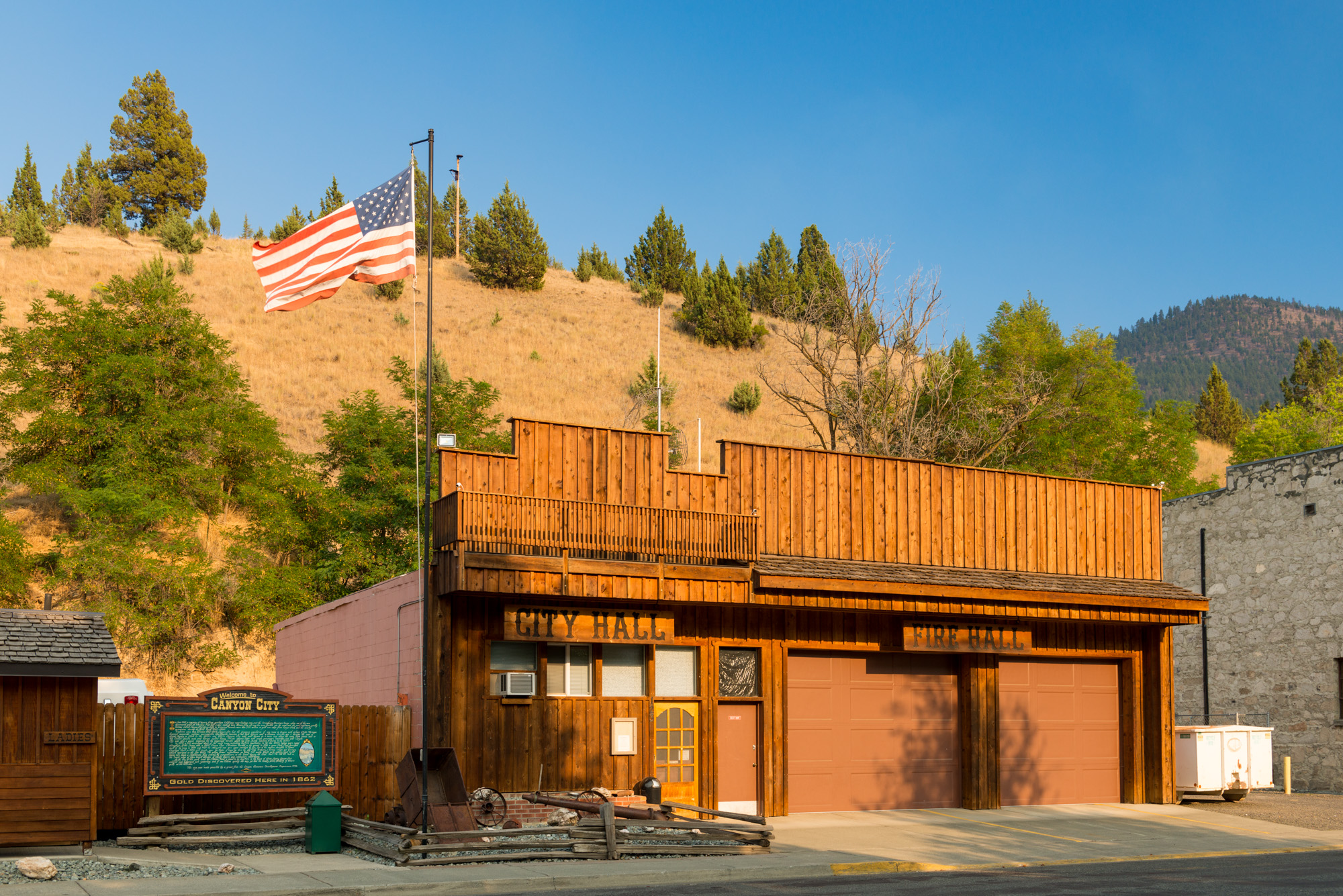
- City hall

- Location in Oregon
- Coordinates: 44°23′35″N 118°56′58″W
- Country: United States
- State: Oregon
- County: Grant
- Incorporated: 1891

Government
  - Mayor: Steve Fischer

Area
  - Total: 1.41 sq mi (3.65 km^{2})
  - Land: 1.41 sq mi (3.65 km^{2})
  - Water: 0 sq mi (0.00 km^{2})
- Elevation: 3,179 ft (969 m)

Population (2020)
  - Total: 660
  - Density: 470/sq mi (181/km^{2})
- Time zone: UTC-8 (Pacific)
  - Summer (DST): UTC-7 (Pacific)
- ZIP code: 97820
- Area code: 541
- FIPS code: 41-10950
- GNIS feature ID: 2413162
- Website: www.townofcanyoncityor.com

Canyon City is a city in Grant County, Oregon, United States. It is the county seat of Grant County, and is about 2 miles (3 km) south of John Day on U.S. Highway 395. As of the 2010 census, the city had a total population of 703.

== Geography ==
Canyon City is along U.S. Route 395 about 2 miles (3 km) south of the city of John Day, the John Day River, and U.S. Route 26. It is 150 miles (240 km) east of Bend and 266 miles (428 km) southeast of Portland.

The city is at an elevation of about 3,200 feet (980 m). Between Canyon City and Burns, to the south, Route 395 passes through parts of the Malheur National Forest. According to the United States Census Bureau, the town has a total area of 1.41 square miles (3.65 km^{2}), all land.

=== Climate ===
This climatic region is typified by large seasonal temperature differences, with warm to hot (and often humid) summers and cold (sometimes severely cold) winters. According to the Köppen Climate Classification system, Canyon City has a humid continental climate, abbreviated "Dfb" on climate maps.

== History ==
Canyon City was established in June 1862 as a result of the discovery of gold in Canyon Creek, which flows from the south to meet the John Day River at John Day. As up to 10,000 miners flocked to Whiskey Gulch and other sections of the canyon during the early stages of the rush, land values between Canyon City and John Day rose to about $500 per square yard ($600/m^{2}). Little of this estimated population influx is reflected in U.S. Census Bureau tallies for Canyon City, which have fluctuated between 250 and about 700 since 1870.

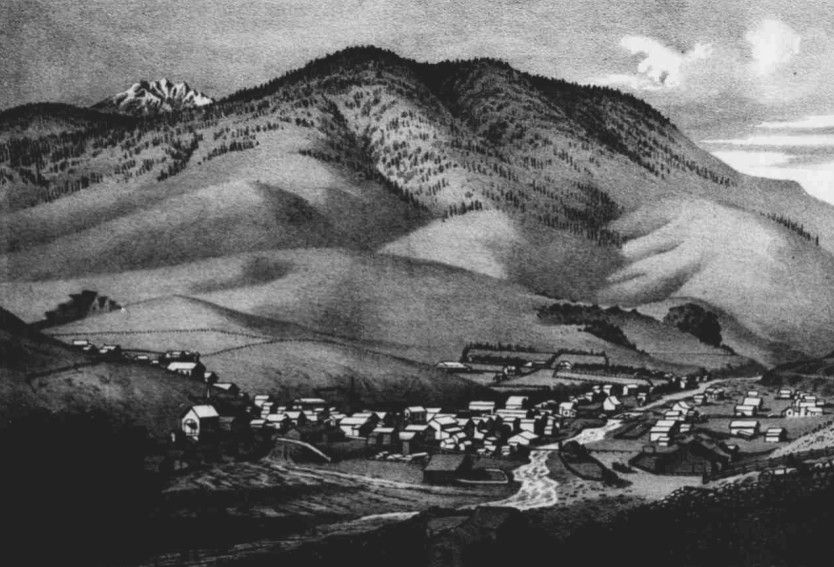
Canyon City circa 1885

Estimates of the total value of Canyon Creek's gold varied. Geologist Waldemar Lindgren indicated that between $3 million and $5 million in gold was extracted for each of the first three years, 1862–64. Rossiter Raymond, the U.S. Commissioner of Mining Statistics, reported an average of $1.1 million a year between 1865 and 1870, afterward gradually tapering downwards. The figures given by Lindgren and Raymond were based on the fixed value of gold at $20.67 per ounce. As such, these authoritative sources should be interpreted to estimate the annual gold production of Canyon Creek at 150,000 to 250,000 ounces in 1862, 1863 and 1864, then averaging 55,000 ounces each year between 1865 and 1870. Earlier estimates that $16 million in gold was extracted from Canyon Creek were revised to $26 million after the fixed value of gold increased to $35 per ounce in 1933. These figures indicate that gross gold production from Canyon Creek for the 40 years between 1862 and 1902 was approximately 800,000 ounces. In 2013, at $1,400 per ounce, that gold would be valued at $1.12 billion. Gold production continued for another 40 years, until 1942, when the War Labor Board issued L-208, which prohibited gold mining and effectively killed the gold mining industry in the United States.

Many miners and others entered the area along a wagon road linking The Dalles on the Columbia River, with Canyon City. A few years later, this road was part of the template for what became known as The Dalles Military Road.

The city was platted in 1862 and was chosen as the county seat two years later, when Grant County was created from old Wasco County and old Umatilla County. Canyon City was incorporated in 1891, and voters elected C. W. Parrish as the first mayor.

== Economy ==
The biggest employer in Canyon City as of 2002 was the county government, which had employees in the courthouse, the jail, and the road and health departments. The second biggest employer was Grant School District, in the district office and in Humboldt Elementary School. The next three biggest were Grayback Forestry, a reforestation and fire-suppression company; Jackson Oil, a gas station, mini-mart, and office; and an Oregon Department of Transportation maintenance shop.

== Demographics ==
Historical population
| Census | Pop. | Note | %± |
|---|---|---|---|
| 1870 | 250 | | — |
| 1880 | 393 | | 57.2% |
| 1890 | 304 | | −22.6% |
| 1900 | 345 | | 13.5% |
| 1910 | 364 | | 5.5% |
| 1920 | 354 | | −2.7% |
| 1930 | 268 | | −24.3% |
| 1940 | 312 | | 16.4% |
| 1950 | 508 | | 62.8% |
| 1960 | 654 | | 28.7% |
| 1970 | 600 | | −8.3% |
| 1980 | 639 | | 6.5% |
| 1990 | 648 | | 1.4% |
| 2000 | 669 | | 3.2% |
| 2010 | 703 | | 5.1% |
| 2020 | 660 | | −6.1% |

=== 2010 census ===
As of the census of 2010, there were 703 people, 322 households, and 198 families residing in the town. The population density was 498.6 inhabitants per square mile (192.5/km^{2}). There were 355 housing units at an average density of 251.8 per square mile (97.2/km^{2}). The racial makeup of the town was 95.2% White, 2.7% Native American, 0.3% Asian, 0.3% from other races, and 1.6% from two or more races. Hispanic or Latino of any race were 2.6% of the population.

There were 322 households, of which 21.4% had children under the age of 18 living with them, 51.6% were married couples living together, 7.8% had a female householder with no husband present, 2.2% had a male householder with no wife present, and 38.5% were non-families. 33.9% of all households were made up of individuals, and 14.9% had someone living alone who was 65 years of age or older. The average household size was 2.16 and the average family size was 2.73.

The median age in the town was 46.8 years. 18.5% of residents were under the age of 18; 6.2% were between the ages of 18 and 24; 22.2% were from 25 to 44; 31.8% were from 45 to 64; and 21.2% were 65 years of age or older. The gender makeup of the town was 45.2% male and 54.8% female.

=== 2000 census ===
As of the census of 2000, there were 669 people in the town, organized into 257 households and 180 families. The population density was 480.3 inhabitants per square mile (185.4/km^{2}). There were 294 housing units at an average density of 211.1 per square mile (81.5/km^{2}). The racial makeup of the town was 90.58% White, 2.84% Native American, 0.15% Black or African American, 2.09% from other races, and 4.33% from two or more races. No one identified himself as Asian or Pacific Islander. 4.63% of the population were Hispanic or Latino of any race.

There were 257 households, out of which 37.7% had children under the age of 18 living with them, 54.1% were married couples living together, 11.7% had a female householder with no husband present, and 29.6% were non-families. 24.9% of all households were made up of individuals, and 8.6% had someone living alone who was 65 years of age or older. The average household size was 2.46 and the average family size was 2.94.

In the town the population was spread out, with 28.7% under the age of 18, 6.4% from 18 to 24, 31.2% from 25 to 44, 20.5% from 45 to 64, and 13.2% who were 65 years of age or older. The median age was 35 years. For every 100 females, there were 99.7 males. For every 100 females age 18 and over, there were 107.4 males.

The median income for a household in the town was $29,940, and the median income for a family was $41,458. Males had a median income of $31,167 versus $23,438 for females. The per capita income for the town was $14,404. 7.8% of the population and 5.7% of families were below the poverty line. Out of the total population, 9.2% of those under the age of 18 and 0.0% of those 65 and older were living below the poverty line.

== Education ==
It is in the John Day School District (a.k.a. the Grant School District).

== Notable person ==
- Joaquin Miller, poet and essayist

== See also ==
- St. Thomas' Episcopal Church (Canyon City, Oregon)
