= Grant County Regional Airport =

Airport in Oregon, United States

Grant County Regional Airport (GCRA) Ogilvie Field
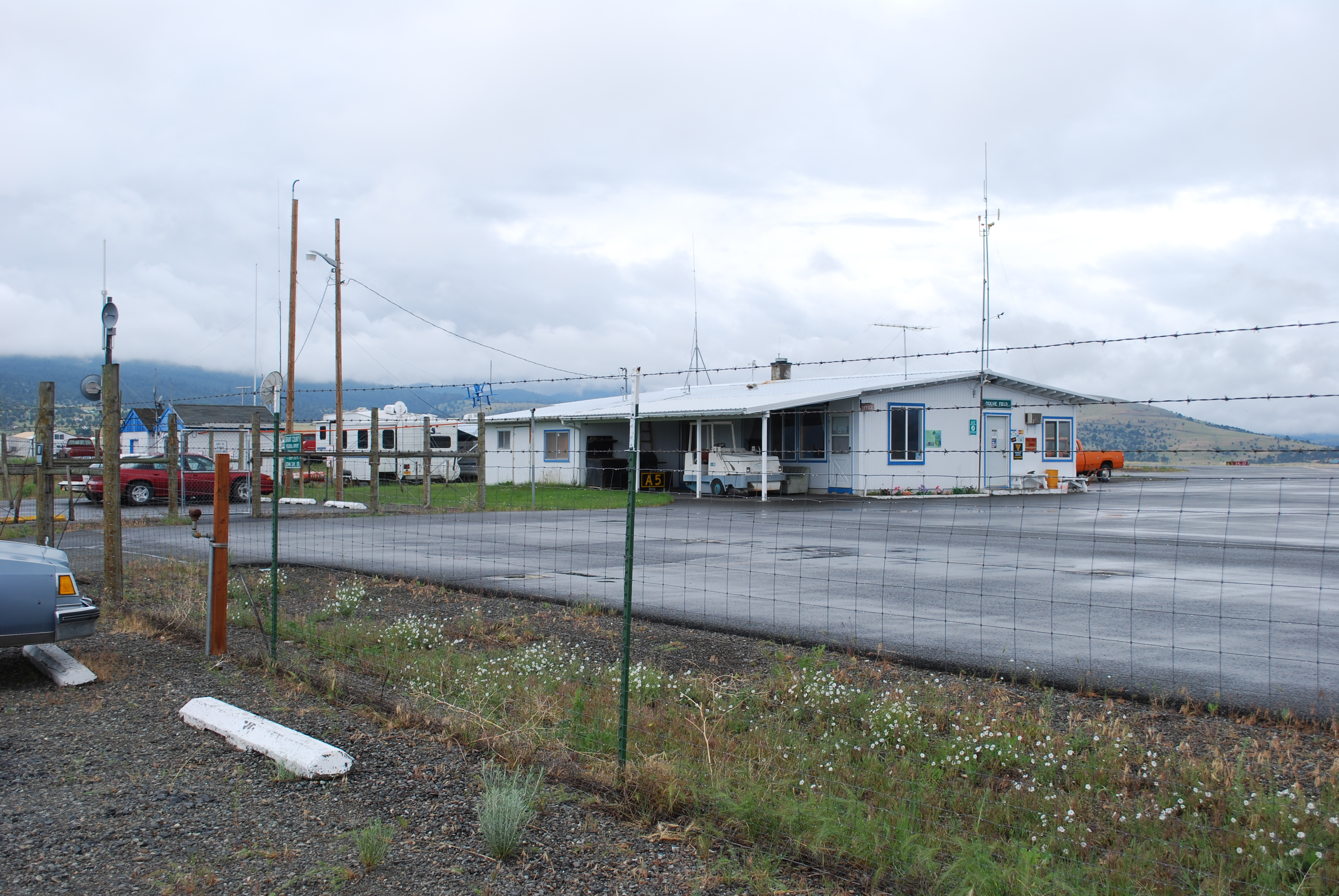
- June 2009
- IATA: JDA; ICAO: KGCD; FAA LID: GCD

Summary
- Airport type: Public
- Owner: Grant County
- Serves: John Day, Oregon
- Elevation AMSL: 3,703 ft (1,129 m)
- Coordinates: 44°24′10″N 118°58′04″W
- Interactive map of Grant County Regional Airport (GCRA)

Runways
| Direction | Length | | Surface |
| Direction | ft | m | Surface |
|---|---|---|---|
| 9/27 | 4,100 | 1,250 | Asphalt |
| 17/35 | 5,224 | 1,592 | Asphalt |

Statistics (2019)
- Aircraft operations (year ending 8/26/2019): 8,925
- Based aircraft: 12
- Source: Federal Aviation Administration

Grant County Regional Airport - GCRA (IATA: JDA, ICAO: KGCD, FAA LID: GCD, formerly 5J0) (Ogilvie Field) is in Grant County, Oregon, a mile southwest of John Day, Oregon. The National Plan of Integrated Airport Systems for 2011–2015 categorized it as a general aviation facility.

Most U.S. airports use the same three-letter location identifier for the FAA and IATA, but this airport is GCD to the FAA and JDA to the IATA.

== Facilities ==
The airport covers 335 acres (136 ha) at an elevation of 3,703 feet (1,129 m). It has two asphalt runways: 17/35 is 5,224 by 60 feet (1,592 x 18 m) and 9/27 is 4,100 by 60 feet (1,250 x 18 m).

In the year ending August 26, 2019, the airport had 8,925 aircraft operations, average 24 per day: 83% general aviation, 17% air taxi, and <1% military. 12 aircraft were then based at the airport: all single-engine.
