= St. Thomas' Episcopal Church (Canyon City, Oregon) =

Historic church in Oregon, United States

- U.S. National Register of Historic Places
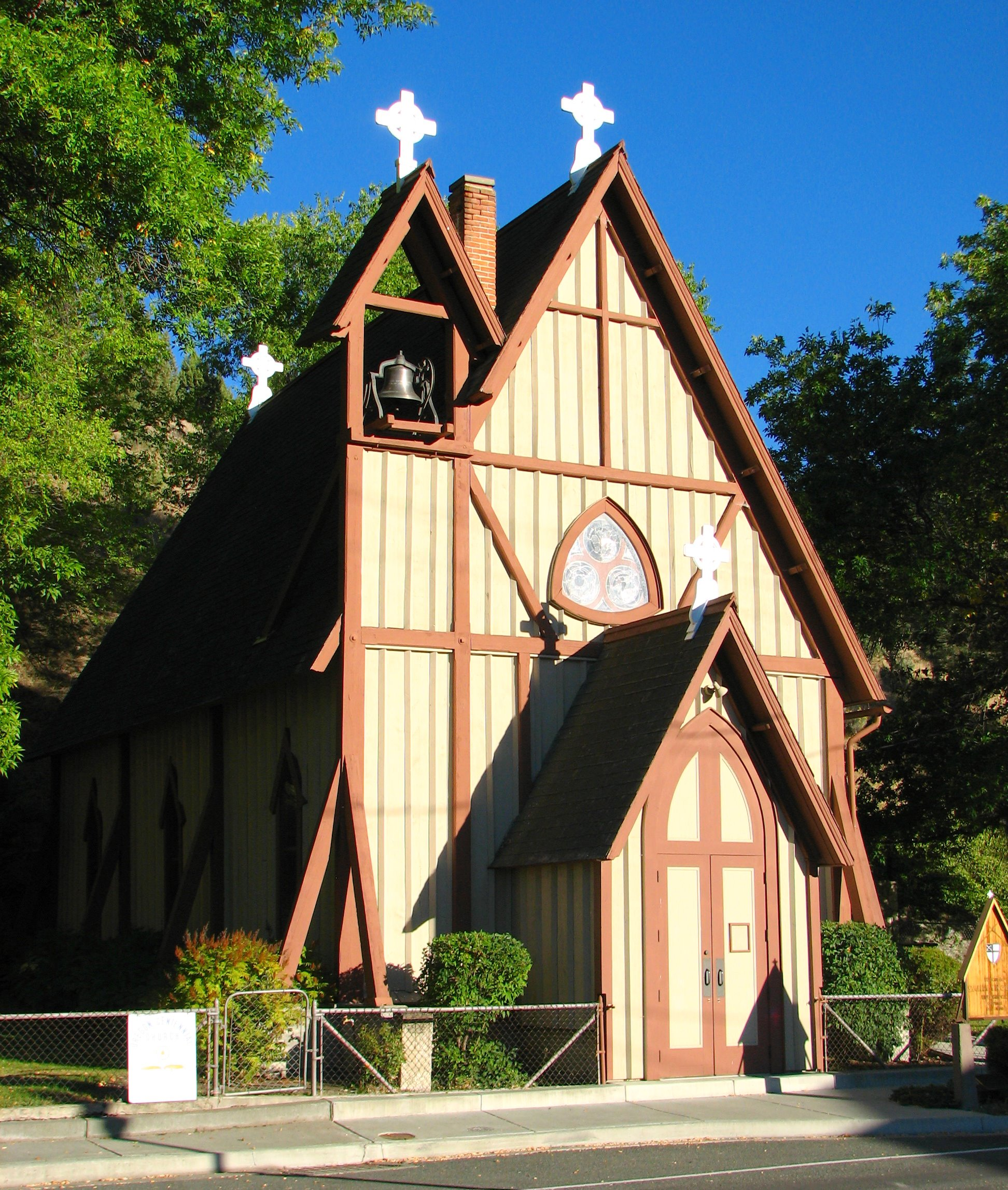

- Location within Oregon Location within the United States
- Location: 135 Washington St., Canyon City, Oregon
- Coordinates: 44°23′9″N 118°56′52″W
- Area: 0.4 acres (0.16 ha)
- Built: 1876
- Architectural style: Stick/eastlake, Jacobean
- NRHP reference No.: 74001685
- Added to NRHP: November 21, 1974

St. Thomas Episcopal Church is a historic church in Canyon City in the U.S. state of Oregon.

== Background ==
It was built in 1876 in a Stick–Eastlake style/Jacobean style. The building was added to the National Register of Historic Places in 1974.
