= Lay ministry =

Term for Christian ministers

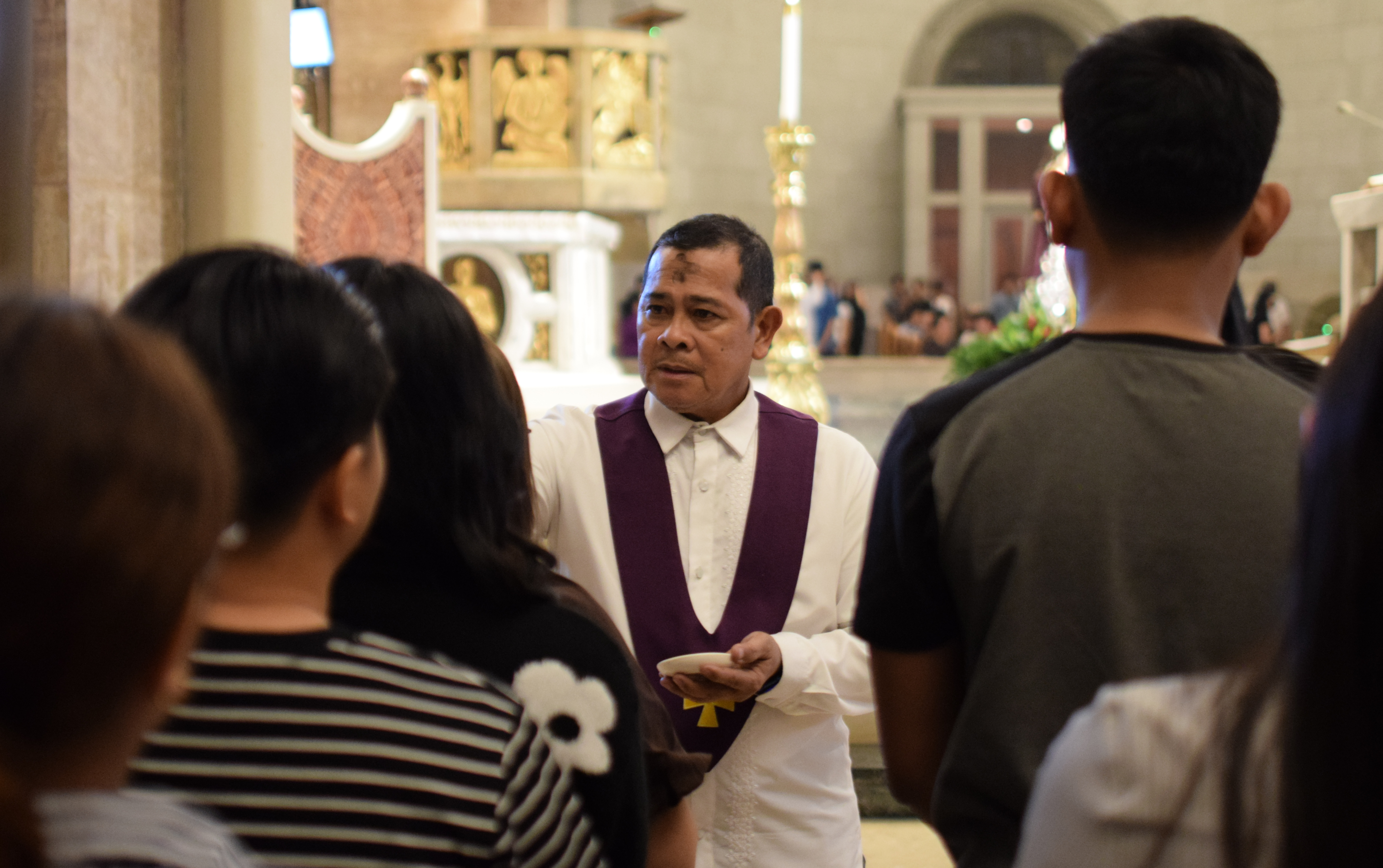
A lay minister at an Ash Wednesday event in Manila Cathedral

Lay ministry are ministers of faith in Christian denominations who are not ordained in that tradition. Lay ministers are people who are elected by the church, full-time or part-time. They may have theological degrees and training, which may be required in certain instances, but not all lay ministries require this qualification. Lay ministers are generally chosen in small communities where it is difficult to find professional clergy to serve roles, and in which lay ministers are appropriate to fulfill the pastoral duties (e.g, a Catholic hospital chaplain does not have to be an ordained priest). In most Protestant churches, deacons, Sunday School teachers, youth ministers, and praise teams are considered lay ministry positions.

== Role ==
The lay ministry's role and importance vary, depending on confession and regional situation:

=== Examples ===
The United States Conference of Catholic Bishops uses the term "lay ecclesial ministry" for a category of non-ordained (non-priest) pastoral ministers.

The idea of volunteer, unpaid leadership and service is very important in the Church of Jesus Christ of Latter-day Saints. Ordinary church members may receive "callings" to serve in any number of positions, from leadership and administration to teaching Sunday school classes for adults or for children. Some of the leadership positions (e.g., bishop) require ordination to the priesthood, and all worthy male members are ordained to the priesthood and thus have the authority necessary to serve in any ecclesiastical position. Some of the general global church leadership positions (e.g., apostle) require full-time service; in those positions, a relatively small stipend is provided for them to support themselves.

== See also ==
- Laity
- Lay preacher
