= Bates, Oregon =

Unincorporated community in the state of Oregon, United States

Coordinates: 44°35′35″N 118°30′31″W

Bates is an unincorporated community in Grant County, Oregon, United States. It has a post office with a ZIP code 97817. The elevation is 4,062 feet (1,238 m).

On December 30, 1960, the Oregon Lumber Company sold the Bates mill and townsite to the Edward Hines Lumber Company, which operated the mill until 1975, when it was closed and dismantled. The post office closed on January 2, 1976.

Bates had a peak population of up to 400. Bates State Park opened in 2011.

== Climate ==
This climatic region is typified by large seasonal temperature differences, with warm to hot (and often humid) summers and cold (sometimes severely cold) winters. According to the Köppen Climate Classification system, Bates has a humid continental climate, abbreviated "Dfb" on climate maps.
