= John Day, Oregon =

- City
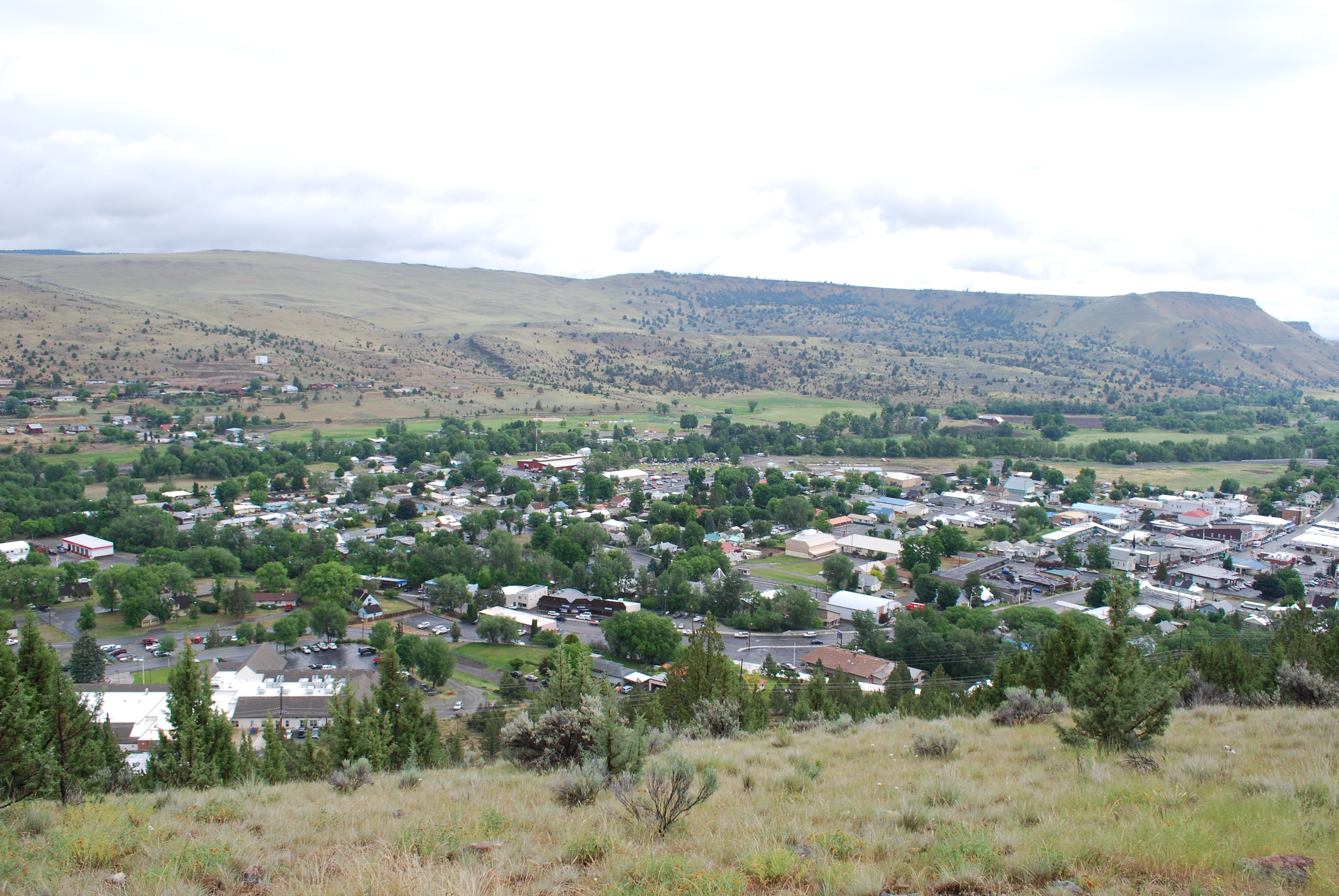

- Location in Oregon
- Coordinates: 44°25′05″N 118°57′23″W
- Country: United States
- State: Oregon
- County: Grant
- Incorporated: 1901

Government
  - Mayor: Ron Lundbom

Area
  - Total: 2.26 sq mi (5.85 km^{2})
  - Land: 2.26 sq mi (5.85 km^{2})
  - Water: 0 sq mi (0.00 km^{2})
- Elevation: 3,078 ft (938 m)

Population (2020)
  - Total: 1,664
  - Density: 737/sq mi (284/km^{2})
- Time zone: UTC-8 (Pacific)
  - Summer (DST): UTC-7 (Pacific)
- ZIP code: 97845
- Area codes: 458 and 541
- FIPS code: 41-37550
- GNIS feature ID: 2410144
- Website: www.cityofjohnday.com

John Day is a city located approximately 2 miles (3.2 km) north of Canyon City in Grant County, Oregon, United States, at the intersection of U.S. Routes 26 and 395. The city was named for the nearby John Day River, which, along with Dayville, had been named for a Virginia member of the 1811 Astor Expedition, John Day. The city was incorporated in 1901.

As of the 2020 census, the city had a total population of 1,664, making it the largest city in the county.

== History ==
The first homestead staked in what is now Grant County (then part of Wasco County), in 1862 by B. C. Trowbridge, was within the limits of the present city of John Day. The Eastern Oregon community was not as quick to grow as neighboring Canyon City, which was the county seat and center of the bustling mining industry in the area. Incrementally, local merchants and residents began relocating to John Day—primarily each time after severe fires in Canyon City: the Grant County Courthouse burned in 1870, Chinatown burned in 1885, and fires in 1898 and 1937 each devastated Canyon City's downtown.

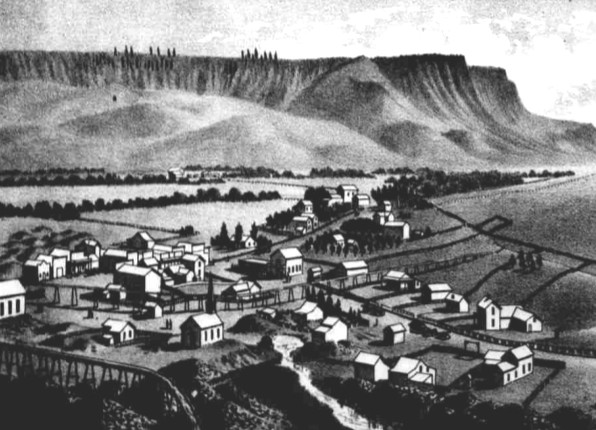
John Day circa 1885

The first post office at "John Day City" was established in 1865, but was discontinued in 1871. It was reestablished in 1879 with the name John Day. In April 1900, a local committee was elected, and the Oregon Legislature approved an Act incorporating the city of John Day on February 23, 1901. The largest part of early John Day was composed of the Chinese community, commonly called Tiger Town. In 1882, the Advent Christian Church in John Day had 547 members, 382 of whom were Chinese (and a number of Chinese residents were interred in the Seventh Day Adventist Cemetery). By 1887, John Day was home to nearly 1,000 Chinese immigrants, who had been attracted to the area by a gold rush 20 years earlier, many of whom were displaced by the 1885 fire in Canyon City.

A trading post built in the area in the 1860s along The Dalles Military Road was purchased in 1887 by two Chinese immigrants, Lung On and Ing Hay. They converted the trading post into a clinic, general store, and social center for the community, which continued to operate until the 1940s. In the 1970s the building, then the property of the city of John Day, was converted into a museum called the Kam Wah Chung & Co. Museum. It is now operated in conjunction with the Oregon Parks and Recreation Department and is one of the premier surviving examples of a 19th-century Chinese apothecary shop. It was designated a National Historic Landmark in 2005.

== Geography ==
According to the United States Census Bureau, the city has a total area of 1.87 square miles (4.84 km^{2}), all land.

John Day is surrounded by the Strawberry Mountains to the south and the Blue Mountains to the east.

=== Geology ===
The bedrock geology of the John Day area is a complex assemblage of Permian to Triassic age metamorphic and igneous rocks which were added to the western North American continental margin by tectonic activity in the Triassic and Jurassic periods. Cenozoic age volcanic rocks related to the long-lived Columbia River Basalt emplacement were deposited above these bedrock units.

The area around John Day contains some of the most important paleontological resources known. From about the time the dinosaurs disappeared right up until the Pleistocene, the region was subjected to significant volcanism and other processes that preserved many fossils. Because the matrix in which the fossils are entombed is datable, the fossils themselves can be dated with excellent precision. This gives paleontologists the ability to study how species changed over time and also how the relationship between ecosystems and climate changed.

=== Climate ===
Despite its dry climate and inland location, John Day has as an oceanic climate (Cfb) according to the Köppen climate classification system. However, it nearly qualifies as a steppe climate (Köppen BSk) due to its relative aridity, and as a humid continental climate (Köppen Dfb) due to its cold winter temperatures.

Climate data for John Day, Oregon (1991–2020 normals, extremes 1903–1906, 1953–present)
Month	Jan	Feb	Mar	Apr	May	Jun	Jul	Aug	Sep	Oct	Nov	Dec	Year
Record high °F (°C)	69 (21)	73 (23)	80 (27)	91 (33)	98 (37)	103 (39)	110 (43)	112 (44)	110 (43)	95 (35)	79 (26)	66 (19)	112 (44)
Mean daily maximum °F (°C)	40.3 (4.6)	44.8 (7.1)	51.5 (10.8)	57.3 (14.1)	66.4 (19.1)	74.5 (23.6)	86.2 (30.1)	85.8 (29.9)	76.7 (24.8)	62.2 (16.8)	47.5 (8.6)	39.0 (3.9)	61.0 (16.1)
Daily mean °F (°C)	30.8 (−0.7)	33.7 (0.9)	38.9 (3.8)	43.8 (6.6)	51.8 (11.0)	58.6 (14.8)	67.0 (19.4)	65.9 (18.8)	57.9 (14.4)	46.7 (8.2)	36.6 (2.6)	29.9 (−1.2)	46.8 (8.2)
Mean daily minimum °F (°C)	21.2 (−6.0)	22.6 (−5.2)	26.4 (−3.1)	30.3 (−0.9)	37.1 (2.8)	42.7 (5.9)	47.8 (8.8)	46.1 (7.8)	39.1 (3.9)	31.1 (−0.5)	25.6 (−3.6)	20.8 (−6.2)	32.6 (0.3)
Record low °F (°C)	−24 (−31)	−20 (−29)	−5 (−21)	13 (−11)	13 (−11)	25 (−4)	35 (2)	30 (−1)	21 (−6)	4 (−16)	−9 (−23)	−23 (−31)	−24 (−31)
Average precipitation inches (mm)	1.09 (28)	0.60 (15)	1.14 (29)	1.49 (38)	1.83 (46)	1.30 (33)	0.43 (11)	0.50 (13)	0.52 (13)	1.04 (26)	1.19 (30)	1.14 (29)	12.27 (312)
Average snowfall inches (cm)	3.5 (8.9)	1.4 (3.6)	1.2 (3.0)	0.3 (0.76)	0.0 (0.0)	0.0 (0.0)	0.0 (0.0)	0.0 (0.0)	0.0 (0.0)	0.2 (0.51)	1.0 (2.5)	2.0 (5.1)	9.6 (24)
Average precipitation days (≥ 0.01 in)	10.6	8.7	10.4	11.9	12.0	8.5	3.3	3.1	4.4	8.2	10.6	11.3	103.0
Average snowy days (≥ 0.1 in)	3.0	1.8	1.2	0.6	0.0	0.0	0.0	0.0	0.0	0.1	1.2	2.7	10.6
Source: NOAA

== Demographics ==
Historical population
Census	Pop.	Note	%±
1870	179		—
1880	280		56.4%
1890	211		−24.6%
1900	282		33.6%
1910	258		−8.5%
1920	321		24.4%
1930	432		34.6%
1940	708		63.9%
1950	1,597		125.6%
1960	1,520		−4.8%
1970	1,566		3.0%
1980	2,012		28.5%
1990	1,836		−8.7%
2000	1,821		−0.8%
2010	1,744		−4.2%
2020	1,664		−4.6%

=== 2020 census ===
As of the 2020 census, John Day had a population of 1,664. The median age was 42.3 years. 20.1% of residents were under the age of 18 and 24.1% of residents were 65 years of age or older. For every 100 females there were 93.5 males, and for every 100 females age 18 and over there were 94.3 males age 18 and over.

0% of residents lived in urban areas, while 100.0% lived in rural areas.

There were 768 households in John Day, of which 25.9% had children under the age of 18 living in them. Of all households, 36.1% were married-couple households, 25.1% were households with a male householder and no spouse or partner present, and 30.6% were households with a female householder and no spouse or partner present. About 39.5% of all households were made up of individuals and 17.7% had someone living alone who was 65 years of age or older.

There were 877 housing units, of which 12.4% were vacant. Among occupied housing units, 60.4% were owner-occupied and 39.6% were renter-occupied. The homeowner vacancy rate was 3.9% and the rental vacancy rate was 10.1%.

Racial composition as of the 2020 census
Race	Number	Percent
White	1,462	87.9%
Black or African American	6	0.4%
American Indian and Alaska Native	18	1.1%
Asian	18	1.1%
Native Hawaiian and Other Pacific Islander	6	0.4%
Some other race	18	1.1%
Two or more races	136	8.2%
Hispanic or Latino (of any race)	54	3.2%

=== 2010 census ===
As of the census of 2010, there were 1,744 people, 794 households, and 450 families residing in the city. The population density was 932.6 inhabitants per square mile (360.1/km^{2}). There were 895 housing units at an average density of 478.6 per square mile (184.8/km^{2}). The racial makeup of the city was 94.4% White, 0.5% African American, 1.5% Native American, 0.7% Asian, 0.1% Pacific Islander, 1.0% from other races, and 1.8% from two or more races. Hispanic or Latino of any race were 2.7% of the population.

There were 794 households, of which 26.8% had children under the age of 18 living with them, 41.4% were married couples living together, 11.6% had a female householder with no husband present, 3.7% had a male householder with no wife present, and 43.3% were non-families. 37.9% of all households were made up of individuals, and 18.5% had someone living alone who was 65 years of age or older. The average household size was 2.13 and the average family size was 2.79.

The median age in the city was 42.9 years. 22.2% of residents were under the age of 18; 7.7% were between the ages of 18 and 24; 22.6% were from 25 to 44; 25.5% were from 45 to 64; and 22% were 65 years of age or older. The gender makeup of the city was 47.6% male and 52.4% female.

=== 2000 census ===
As of the census of 2000, there were 1821 people, 734 households, and 472 families residing in the city. The population density was 969.5 inhabitants per square mile (374.3/km^{2}). There were 846 housing units at an average density of 450.4 per square mile (173.9/km^{2}). The racial makeup of the city was 96.92% White, 1.15% Native American, 0.38% Asian, 0.16% Pacific Islander, 0% African American, 0.55% from other races, and 0.82% from two or more races. Hispanic or Latino of any race were 2.42% of the population.

There were 734 households, out of which 32.7% had children under the age of 18 living with them, 51.0% were married couples living together, 10.2% had a female householder with no husband present, and 35.6% were non-families. 31.9% of all households were made up of individuals, and 12.4% had someone living alone who was 65 years of age or older. The average household size was 2.40 and the average family size was 3.01.

In the city, the population was spread out, with 27.0% under the age of 18, 7.8% from 18 to 24, 23.2% from 25 to 44, 23.7% from 45 to 64, and 18.3% who were 65 years of age or older. The median age was 40 years. For every 100 females, there were 92.5 males. For every 100 females age 18 and over, there were 88.8 males.

The median income for a household in the city was $31,953, and the median income for a family was $34,327. Males had a median income of $31,908 versus $22,067 for females. The per capita income for the city was $15,488. About 13.0% of families and 17.5% of the population were living below the poverty line, including 21.0% of those under the age of 18 and 22.4% of those 65 and older.

== Economy ==
Historically, industrial and agricultural businesses like gold mining, sheep and cattle ranching, timber harvesting, and lumber milling have been the economic mainstays of the community. However, federal policies that shut down all gold mining in the United States in 1942, the decreasing availability of ponderosa pine due to a lack of timber sales, and relatively high transportation costs have resulted in a significant decrease in the viability of the resource-based economic sector. Other employments, such as in recreation, health care, and government (the headquarters of the Malheur National Forest administration is located in John Day) now account for a majority of jobs in the city.

== Education ==
It is in the John Day School District (a.k.a. the Grant School District).

== Infrastructure ==
=== Transportation ===
- Grant County Regional Airport
- U.S. Route 26 and U.S. Route 395.
