= List of mines in Oregon =

This list of mines in Oregon summarizes the mines listed by the Geographic Names Information System. As of January 7, 2014, there are 595 entries.

| name | type | elevation | coordinate | USGS map | GNIS ID |
|---|---|---|---|---|---|
| Agency Creek Quarry | Mine | 699 ft (213 m) | 45.1356°N 123.6756°W | Niagara Creek | 1137031 |
| Ajax Mine | Mine | 2,356 ft (718 m) | 42.6611°N 123.5928°W | Mount Reuben | 1116793 |
| Ajax Mine | Mine | 5,318 ft (1,621 m) | 44.8564°N 118.4008°W | Granite | 1137040 |
| Al Sarena Buzzard Mine | Mine | 3,458 ft (1,054 m) | 42.8450°N 122.6053°W | Whetstone Point | 1137042 |
| Alamo Mine | Mine | 5,597 ft (1,706 m) | 44.7650°N 118.4744°W | Granite | 1137046 |
| Albany Mine | Mine | 2,621 ft (799 m) | 44.5992°N 122.3111°W | Quartzville | 1137048 |
| Alberg Mine | Mine | 3,809 ft (1,161 m) | 42.1253°N 123.7825°W | Josephine Mountain | 1116533 |
| Albright Mine (historical) | Mine | 1,647 ft (502 m) | 42.2928°N 123.7900°W | Pearsoll Peak | 1154850 |
| Alexander Mine | Mine | 4,787 ft (1,459 m) | 42.5556°N 118.5567°W | Alvord Hot Springs | 1638793 |
| Almeda Mine | Mine | 883 ft (269 m) | 42.6103°N 123.5844°W | Galice | 1137161 |
| Amalgamated Mine | Mine | 5,807 ft (1,770 m) | 44.9928°N 117.2897°W | Sparta Butte | 1137182 |
| Amalgamated Mine | Mine | 2,418 ft (737 m) | 44.8425°N 122.1994°W | Battle Ax | 1155876 |
| Aman Ranch Placer | Mine | 1,329 ft (405 m) | 42.6861°N 123.3831°W | Glendale | 1116905 |
| Amazon Mine | Mine | 5,417 ft (1,651 m) | 44.8144°N 118.2292°W | Bourne | 1116908 |
| American Fossil Mine | Mine | 4,314 ft (1,315 m) | 43.2175°N 120.7981°W | Thorn Lake | 1160854 |
| Amity Mine | Mine | 4,961 ft (1,512 m) | 44.3494°N 120.3225°W | Lookout Mountain | 1137186 |
| Anaconda Mine | Mine | 2,169 ft (661 m) | 42.6803°N 123.3153°W | Golden | 1116920 |
| Analulu Mine | Mine | 5,610 ft (1,710 m) | 44.8033°N 118.2381°W | Bourne | 1116921 |
| Anderson Mine | Mine | 1,736 ft (529 m) | 42.3800°N 123.1192°W | Gold Hill | 1135728 |
| Anderson Mine | Mine | 1,302 ft (397 m) | 42.2681°N 123.6906°W | Eight Dollar Mountain | 1155923 |
| Andrews Mine | Mine | 4,508 ft (1,374 m) | 44.4497°N 119.7658°W | Antone | 1137214 |
| Angel Peak Mine | Mine | 5,925 ft (1,806 m) | 42.3000°N 120.7331°W | Cougar Peak | 1131010 |
| Annie Creek Pit | Mine | 4,360 ft (1,330 m) | 42.7625°N 122.0592°W | Maklaks Crater | 1156309 |
| Archer Mine | Mine | 1,145 ft (349 m) | 42.6461°N 123.5114°W | Mount Reuben | 1133741 |
| Argonaut Mine | Mine | 6,975 ft (2,126 m) | 44.8564°N 118.2314°W | Bourne | 1117035 |
| Arnold Mine | Mine | 5,712 ft (1,741 m) | 42.0086°N 123.2936°W | Grayback Mountain | 1137301 |
| Ashland Mine | Mine | 2,507 ft (764 m) | 42.2039°N 122.7517°W | Talent | 1137321 |
| Aspen Butte Cinder Pit | Mine | 5,308 ft (1,618 m) | 42.2561°N 122.0550°W | Aspen Lake | 1167666 |
| Aspen Lake Cinder Pit | Mine | 5,282 ft (1,610 m) | 42.2556°N 122.0547°W | Aspen Lake | 1156254 |
| Aurelia Mine | Mine | 6,142 ft (1,872 m) | 45.0067°N 118.2594°W | Limber Jim Creek | 1117093 |
| Aurora Mine | Mine | 6,243 ft (1,903 m) | 44.7092°N 118.4911°W | Greenhorn | 1137343 |
| Axehandle Mine | Mine | 3,809 ft (1,161 m) | 44.7469°N 120.6667°W | Axehandle Butte | 1117107 |
| Baby McKee Mine | Mine | 6,332 ft (1,930 m) | 44.8817°N 118.2569°W | Crawfish Lake | 1137372 |
| Baby Mine | Mine | 2,192 ft (668 m) | 42.5339°N 123.3092°W | Sexton Mountain | 1117120 |
| Babyfoot Mine | Mine | 4,068 ft (1,240 m) | 42.2253°N 123.8142°W | Josephine Mountain | 1116498 |
| Bainfield Mine | Mine | 2,218 ft (676 m) | 42.8358°N 122.9289°W | Richter Mountain | 1137421 |
| Baker Mine | Mine | 2,605 ft (794 m) | 42.7136°N 123.5783°W | Mount Reuben | 1117159 |
| Bald Mountain Mine | Mine | 5,751 ft (1,753 m) | 44.8111°N 118.2878°W | Mount Ireland | 1117183 |
| Baldy Creek Quarry | Mine | 285 ft (87 m) | 44.9461°N 123.9944°W | Devils Lake | 2664316 |
| Balm Creek Shaft | Mine | 3,471 ft (1,058 m) | 44.9169°N 117.4767°W | Balm Creek Reservoir | 1137488 |
| Balsam Road Quarry | Mine | 4,429 ft (1,350 m) | 42.1939°N 121.8500°W | Klamath Falls | 2664317 |
| Banner Mine | Mine | 6,168 ft (1,880 m) | 44.6978°N 118.5075°W | Vinegar Hill | 1137499 |
| Bannister Pit | Mine | 554 ft (169 m) | 45.8389°N 119.3811°W | Ordnance | 2664318 |
| Bantam Mine | Mine | 1,680 ft (510 m) | 42.6822°N 123.6233°W | Mount Reuben | 1133739 |
| Barr Mine | Mine | 2,165 ft (660 m) | 42.4544°N 123.6878°W | Chrome Ridge | 1137540 |
| Barron Mine | Mine | 3,432 ft (1,046 m) | 42.1664°N 122.5519°W | Emigrant Lake | 1135649 |
| Basin Mine | Mine | 5,223 ft (1,592 m) | 45.0119°N 117.4711°W | Bennet Peak | 1117297 |
| Bear Creek Agate Beds | Mine | 3,839 ft (1,170 m) | 44.0761°N 120.7567°W | Bowman Dam | 1638509 |
| Bear Mine | Mine | 2,178 ft (664 m) | 42.2428°N 123.3097°W | Williams | 1137727 |
| Beaverton Quarry | Mine | 522 ft (159 m) | 45.4556°N 122.8919°W | Scholls | 2664382 |
| Belcher Mine | Mine | 6,247 ft (1,904 m) | 44.7286°N 118.4919°W | Greenhorn | 1137893 |
| Belfast Mine | Mine | 276 ft (84 m) | 43.3397°N 124.2081°W | Coos Bay | 1157818 |
| Belle of Baker Mine | Mine | 6,499 ft (1,981 m) | 44.8208°N 118.2608°W | Mount Ireland | 1117494 |
| Ben Harrison Mine | Mine | 6,424 ft (1,958 m) | 44.7442°N 118.5772°W | Vinegar Hill | 1137910 |
| Benton Mine | Mine | 1,401 ft (427 m) | 42.6806°N 123.6342°W | Bunker Creek | 1117542 |
| Berrenth Quarry | Mine | 558 ft (170 m) | 45.0906°N 122.5939°W | Wilhoit | 1117550 |
| Big Elk Mine | Mine | 5,669 ft (1,728 m) | 44.7381°N 118.4597°W | Greenhorn | 1138021 |
| Big Four Mine | Mine | 5,650 ft (1,720 m) | 44.8731°N 118.4378°W | Granite | 1138030 |
| Big Nugget Mine | Mine | 4,934 ft (1,504 m) | 44.5553°N 119.1628°W | Belshaw Meadows | 1133814 |
| Big Slide Lode | Mine | 2,342 ft (714 m) | 42.7108°N 123.2706°W | Golden | 1117667 |
| Bill Nye Mine | Mine | 1,572 ft (479 m) | 42.3908°N 123.0581°W | Gold Hill | 1117697 |
| Bimetallic Mine | Mine | 6,926 ft (2,111 m) | 44.7181°N 118.5408°W | Vinegar Hill | 1155465 |
| Black Bear Mine | Mine | 1,949 ft (594 m) | 42.5836°N 123.6186°W | Galice | 1138171 |
| Black Butte Mine | Mine | 1,772 ft (540 m) | 43.5739°N 123.0636°W | Harness Mountain | 1117748 |
| Black Butte Mine | Mine | 5,056 ft (1,541 m) | 44.5539°N 119.1600°W | Belshaw Meadows | 1138179 |
| Black Eagle Mine | Mine | 2,080 ft (630 m) | 44.8622°N 122.2736°W | Elkhorn | 1138199 |
| Blackjack Mine | Mine | 4,767 ft (1,453 m) | 44.7839°N 118.4717°W | Granite | 1138231 |
| Blanket Ledge Mine | Mine | 5,381 ft (1,640 m) | 42.0108°N 123.4714°W | Oregon Caves | 1134927 |
| Blue Bucket Mine | Mine | 4,800 ft (1,500 m) | 44.8836°N 118.7794°W | The Cockscomb | 1138285 |
| Blue Channel Placer | Mine | 1,506 ft (459 m) | 42.6825°N 123.3417°W | Golden | 1117836 |
| Blue Jay Mine | Mine | 1,814 ft (553 m) | 42.7681°N 124.2361°W | Barklow Mountain | 1134628 |
| Blue Jay Mine | Mine | 2,746 ft (837 m) | 44.8542°N 122.1789°W | Battle Ax | 1138306 |
| Blue Mountain Mine | Mine | 4,882 ft (1,488 m) | 44.7906°N 118.4869°W | Granite | 1138322 |
| Blue Mud Mine | Mine | 5,138 ft (1,566 m) | 44.4214°N 117.5969°W | Mormon Basin | 1133927 |
| Blue Ribbon Mine | Mine | 6,047 ft (1,843 m) | 44.8711°N 118.3817°W | Granite | 1138326 |
| Blue Ridge Mine | Mine | 4,921 ft (1,500 m) | 44.3547°N 120.3133°W | Lookout Mountain | 1638219 |
| Bluebird Mine | Mine | 5,230 ft (1,590 m) | 44.7664°N 118.4944°W | Granite | 1158130 |
| Bluebird Mine | Mine | 4,721 ft (1,439 m) | 44.7978°N 118.4717°W | Granite | 1158131 |
| Bobbit Mine | Mine | 2,408 ft (734 m) | 42.1211°N 123.1478°W | Carberry Creek | 1138369 |
| Bolan Creek Mine | Mine | 2,457 ft (749 m) | 42.0689°N 123.4508°W | Oregon Caves | 1138390 |
| Bolan Mine | Mine | 3,940 ft (1,200 m) | 42.0389°N 123.4636°W | Oregon Caves | 1138393 |
| Bolivar Mine | Mine | 2,739 ft (835 m) | 42.8031°N 123.8531°W | Mount Bolivar | 1116479 |
| Bonanza Mine | Mine | 1,207 ft (368 m) | 43.3939°N 123.1844°W | Nonpareil | 1117920 |
| Bonanza Mine | Mine | 5,748 ft (1,752 m) | 44.7097°N 118.4094°W | Greenhorn | 1138406 |
| Bonanza Mine | Mine | 1,654 ft (504 m) | 44.8550°N 122.2886°W | Elkhorn | 1138407 |
| Bone of Contention Mine | Mine | 1,611 ft (491 m) | 42.2442°N 123.2431°W | Tallowbox Mountain | 1138411 |
| Bonnie Doone Number One Mine | Mine | 1,066 ft (325 m) | 45.7972°N 116.7550°W | Deadhorse Ridge | 1138430 |
| Boston Tunnel | Mine | 5,827 ft (1,776 m) | 44.8636°N 118.3897°W | Granite | 1138452 |
| Boswell Mine | Mine | 2,766 ft (843 m) | 42.1294°N 123.4775°W | Kerby Peak | 1134055 |
| Boulder Group Mine | Mine | 5,837 ft (1,779 m) | 44.5528°N 118.6269°W | Dixie Meadows | 1155464 |
| Bowser Mine | Mine | 2,644 ft (806 m) | 42.2558°N 123.8561°W | Pearsoll Peak | 1138518 |
| Bowyer Quarry | Mine | 2,477 ft (755 m) | 45.1542°N 122.1256°W | Bedford Point | 2664381 |
| Braden Mine | Mine | 1,680 ft (510 m) | 42.4058°N 123.0539°W | Gold Hill | 1118027 |
| Bradley Creek Mine | Mine | 5,666 ft (1,727 m) | 45.0061°N 117.3625°W | Krag Peak | 1138560 |
| Braymill Cinder Pit | Mine | 4,429 ft (1,350 m) | 42.6183°N 121.8122°W | Chiloquin | 1156455 |
| Brazos Mine | Mine | 4,131 ft (1,259 m) | 44.7142°N 117.6514°W | Encina | 1118049 |
| Bretz Mine | Mine | 5,541 ft (1,689 m) | 42.0444°N 117.9025°W | Bretz Mine | 1157789 |
| Bristol Quarry | Mine | 2,552 ft (778 m) | 42.2242°N 123.3386°W | Williams | 1138634 |
| Broken Pick Mine | Mine | 4,262 ft (1,299 m) | 44.4489°N 117.5033°W | Mormon Basin | 1133926 |
| Brooklyn Mine | Mine | 5,587 ft (1,703 m) | 44.8172°N 118.2319°W | Bourne | 1118108 |
| Brown Owl Mine | Mine | 2,700 ft (820 m) | 42.2436°N 123.3172°W | Williams | 1138675 |
| Buck Gulch Mine | Mine | 5,187 ft (1,581 m) | 44.7511°N 118.2722°W | Mount Ireland | 1118189 |
| Buck Rock Tunnel | Mine | 3,658 ft (1,115 m) | 42.0908°N 122.5578°W | Siskiyou Pass | 1637988 |
| Buckeye Mine | Mine | 7,795 ft (2,376 m) | 44.8414°N 118.1636°W | Bourne | 1118227 |
| Buckeye Mine | Mine | 2,697 ft (822 m) | 42.4114°N 123.5844°W | Onion Mountain | 1138848 |
| Buckhorn Mine | Mine | 5,043 ft (1,537 m) | 44.4189°N 117.5992°W | Mormon Basin | 1118235 |
| Buckhorn Mine | Mine | 7,303 ft (2,226 m) | 44.8583°N 118.2969°W | Mount Ireland | 1118236 |
| Buffalo Mine | Mine | 6,115 ft (1,864 m) | 44.8667°N 118.3883°W | Granite | 1138881 |
| Bullrun Mine | Mine | 5,197 ft (1,584 m) | 44.3844°N 118.2547°W | Rail Gulch | 1138941 |
| Bunker Hill Mine | Mine | 5,800 ft (1,800 m) | 44.8114°N 118.2381°W | Bourne | 1118316 |
| Bunker Hill Mine | Mine | 3,674 ft (1,120 m) | 42.5544°N 123.7233°W | Mount Peavine | 1138960 |
| Bunker Hill Mine (historical) | Mine | 279 ft (85 m) | 43.3525°N 124.2050°W | Coos Bay | 1157807 |
| Burn Creek Mine | Mine | 4,541 ft (1,384 m) | 45.0100°N 117.5481°W | Flagstaff Butte | 2697291 |
| Buster Creek Quarry | Mine | 761 ft (232 m) | 45.8892°N 123.4956°W | Sager Creek | 1160894 |
| Butcher Boy Mine | Mine | 5,305 ft (1,617 m) | 44.7639°N 118.4950°W | Granite | 1139034 |
| Butler Mine | Mine | 6,014 ft (1,833 m) | 44.6950°N 118.6058°W | Vinegar Hill | 1156695 |
| California Mine | Mine | 7,208 ft (2,197 m) | 44.8644°N 118.2772°W | Mount Ireland | 1118468 |
| California Mine | Mine | 1,148 ft (350 m) | 42.6725°N 123.5797°W | Mount Reuben | 1118469 |
| Camp Carson Mine | Mine | 5,344 ft (1,629 m) | 45.0342°N 118.2908°W | Limber Jim Creek | 1118494 |
| Camp Quarry | Mine | 449 ft (137 m) | 44.0442°N 123.8706°W | Mapleton | 1638037 |
| Cap Martin Mine | Mine | 5,669 ft (1,728 m) | 44.8561°N 118.3697°W | Mount Ireland | 1118590 |
| Cape Blanco Mine | Mine | 59 ft (18 m) | 42.8233°N 124.5400°W | Cape Blanco | 1132534 |
| Celebration Mine | Mine | 6,230 ft (1,900 m) | 44.3342°N 118.8097°W | Pine Creek Mountain | 1139539 |
| Chambers Mine | Mine | 6,519 ft (1,987 m) | 44.3511°N 118.8142°W | Pine Creek Mountain | 1139556 |
| Champion Mine | Mine | 4,314 ft (1,315 m) | 43.5828°N 122.6333°W | Fairview Peak | 1139559 |
| Chickamin Mine | Mine | 75 ft (23 m) | 43.3506°N 124.3067°W | Charleston | 1638808 |
| Chieftain Mine | Mine | 1,125 ft (343 m) | 43.0394°N 123.0900°W | White Rock | 1139641 |
| China Cap Mine | Mine | 4,918 ft (1,499 m) | 43.1861°N 119.7400°W | Goose Egg Butte | 1162102 |
| China Diggings | Mine | 4,012 ft (1,223 m) | 44.6578°N 118.6517°W | Boulder Butte | 1639298 |
| Chloride Mine | Mine | 6,027 ft (1,837 m) | 44.8592°N 118.1297°W | Bourne | 1118926 |
| Chrome King Mine | Mine | 3,130 ft (950 m) | 42.3114°N 123.8181°W | Pearsoll Peak | 1139719 |
| Cinderella Mine (historical) | Mine | 4,088 ft (1,246 m) | 44.2311°N 122.3342°W | Blue River | 1118944 |
| Cinnabar Mine | Mine | 5,505 ft (1,678 m) | 44.3517°N 119.1578°W | McClellan Mountain | 1139734 |
| Cinnabar Mountain Mine | Mine | 2,323 ft (708 m) | 42.5731°N 122.9317°W | Boswell Mountain | 1135444 |
| Cleveland Mine | Mine | 4,819 ft (1,469 m) | 44.4200°N 117.5847°W | Mormon Basin | 1119016 |
| Cliff Mine | Mine | 3,707 ft (1,130 m) | 44.8264°N 117.7283°W | Virtue Flat | 1119019 |
| Cohoe Mine | Mine | 4,724 ft (1,440 m) | 44.5647°N 119.1553°W | Belshaw Meadows | 1139907 |
| Colorado Mine | Mine | 2,979 ft (908 m) | 43.5553°N 122.6206°W | Bearbones Mountain | 1153339 |
| Columbia Mine | Mine | 3,386 ft (1,032 m) | 44.8019°N 117.6753°W | Virtue Flat | 1119168 |
| Columbia Mine | Mine | 5,886 ft (1,794 m) | 44.8264°N 118.2072°W | Bourne | 1119169 |
| Columbia Mine | Mine | 2,090 ft (640 m) | 42.4978°N 123.2639°W | Grants Pass | 1140013 |
| Columbia Placer | Mine | 1,680 ft (510 m) | 42.6444°N 123.3156°W | Golden | 1119171 |
| Columbia Quarry | Mine | 1,555 ft (474 m) | | Marcus | 1517980 |
| Con-Virginia Mine | Mine | 4,140 ft (1,260 m) | 44.7614°N 117.6981°W | Virtue Flat | 1119191 |
| Connor Creek Mine | Mine | 4,153 ft (1,266 m) | 44.5714°N 117.1947°W | Connor Creek | 1119208 |
| Continental Mine | Mine | 1,237 ft (377 m) | 43.0397°N 123.0981°W | White Rock | 1140050 |
| Continental Mine | Mine | 6,240 ft (1,900 m) | 44.8869°N 118.3650°W | Crawfish Lake | 1140051 |
| Copper Mountain Mine | Mine | 6,263 ft (1,909 m) | 45.1375°N 117.0594°W | Lick Creek | 1154748 |
| Copper Queen Mine | Mine | 2,008 ft (612 m) | 42.6194°N 123.3936°W | Merlin | 1119272 |
| Copperopolis Mine | Mine | 4,879 ft (1,487 m) | 44.5575°N 118.6806°W | Dixie Meadows | 1140111 |
| Corbell Cinder Pit | Mine | 5,043 ft (1,537 m) | 42.5467°N 121.7917°W | Chiloquin | 1156590 |
| Corey | Mine | 5,397 ft (1,645 m) | 44.7231°N 118.2567°W | Whitney | 1140121 |
| Cornucopia Mines | Mine | 5,856 ft (1,785 m) | 45.0128°N 117.2136°W | Cornucopia | 1119286 |
| Cougar Mine | Mine | 3,182 ft (970 m) | 42.6919°N 123.2767°W | Golden | 1119380 |
| Cougar Mine | Mine | 5,390 ft (1,640 m) | 44.8489°N 118.4139°W | Granite | 1140234 |
| Cougar Ridge Mine | Mine | 5,226 ft (1,593 m) | 44.5478°N 118.6961°W | Dixie Meadows | 1155460 |
| Coulter Tunnel | Mine | 4,829 ft (1,472 m) | 45.0131°N 117.1975°W | Cornucopia | 1638056 |
| Courier Mine | Mine | 1,722 ft (525 m) | 42.4031°N 123.7233°W | Chrome Ridge | 1140255 |
| Cox Mine (historical) | Mine | 3,068 ft (935 m) | 42.2747°N 123.8053°W | Pearsoll Peak | 1154849 |
| Cox Tunnels | Mine | 6,174 ft (1,882 m) | 44.8703°N 118.3858°W | Granite | 1140302 |
| Coyote Mine | Mine | 2,136 ft (651 m) | 42.6853°N 123.2958°W | Golden | 1119472 |
| Crown Mine | Mine | 2,585 ft (788 m) | 44.8292°N 122.3225°W | Elkhorn | 1140492 |
| Crown Point Mine | Mine | 7,090 ft (2,160 m) | 44.8589°N 118.2900°W | Mount Ireland | 1119595 |
| Crystal Palace Mine | Mine | 4,039 ft (1,231 m) | 44.8553°N 117.3706°W | Sparta | 1119609 |
| Cutting Mine | Mine | 5,161 ft (1,573 m) | 44.5572°N 117.5781°W | Lost Basin | 1638453 |
| Daddy Lode Mine | Mine | 3,989 ft (1,216 m) | 44.9425°N 117.4175°W | Balm Creek Reservoir | 1140585 |
| Daffodil Mine | Mine | 2,733 ft (833 m) | 42.0044°N 123.0589°W | Squaw Lakes | 1140587 |
| Daisy Mine | Mine | 3,635 ft (1,108 m) | 42.6128°N 123.2539°W | Sexton Mountain | 1119670 |
| Dawson Mine | Mine | 5,364 ft (1,635 m) | 44.6856°N 118.4906°W | Greenhorn | 1140673 |
| Deep Gorge Mine | Mine | 984 ft (300 m) | 42.3147°N 123.7839°W | Pearsoll Peak | 1155701 |
| Del Monte Mine | Mine | 4,049 ft (1,234 m) | 44.8697°N 117.3197°W | Sparta | 1119846 |
| Diamond Jack Mine | Mine | 4,737 ft (1,444 m) | 44.6961°N 118.3933°W | Greenhorn | 1140998 |
| Diatomite Mine Headquarters | Mine | 2,529 ft (771 m) | 44.3597°N 121.2944°W | Cline Falls | 1129577 |
| Dixie Meadows Mine | Mine | 5,308 ft (1,618 m) | 44.6017°N 118.6953°W | Dixie Meadows | 1141084 |
| Dixie Trail Mine | Mine | 4,947 ft (1,508 m) | 44.5769°N 118.5872°W | Bates | 1155458 |
| Don Juan Mine | Mine | 5,807 ft (1,770 m) | 44.7050°N 118.4794°W | Greenhorn | 1141168 |
| Donaldson Mine | Mine | 6,765 ft (2,062 m) | 44.7603°N 118.6689°W | Desolation Butte | 1141173 |
| Dorothea Mine | Mine | 2,467 ft (752 m) | 42.6844°N 123.2856°W | Golden | 1120036 |
| Dry Camp Mine | Mine | 5,587 ft (1,703 m) | 44.3644°N 118.7836°W | Pine Creek Mountain | 1141265 |
| E and E Mine | Mine | 5,633 ft (1,717 m) | 44.8308°N 118.2011°W | Bourne | 1120251 |
| Eagle Mine | Mine | 207 ft (63 m) | 43.1942°N 124.3650°W | Riverton | 1132139 |
| Eagles Nest Mine | Mine | 3,934 ft (1,199 m) | 42.2842°N 123.8417°W | Pearsoll Peak | 1155698 |
| East Eagle Mine | Mine | 4,055 ft (1,236 m) | 45.0036°N 117.3531°W | Krag Peak | 1141523 |
| Eckman Quarry | Mine | 190 ft (58 m) | 44.3908°N 124.0331°W | Waldport | 1159282 |
| Edmonds Mine | Mine | 2,169 ft (661 m) | 42.0978°N 123.4694°W | Oregon Caves | 1141680 |
| Edna Mine | Mine | 2,047 ft (624 m) | 45.7911°N 116.7653°W | Deadhorse Ridge | 1141682 |
| Elk Heaven Mine | Mine | 7,175 ft (2,187 m) | 44.8678°N 118.2978°W | Mount Ireland | 1120455 |
| Elkhead Mines | Mine | 860 ft (260 m) | 43.5578°N 123.1694°W | Scotts Valley | 1120470 |
| Elkhorn Mine | Mine | 1,972 ft (601 m) | 42.4222°N 123.7083°W | Chrome Ridge | 1141818 |
| Elliot Mine | Mine | 4,052 ft (1,235 m) | 44.5142°N 117.9192°W | Brannan Gulch | 1120484 |
| Emma Mine | Mine | 4,360 ft (1,330 m) | 44.7686°N 117.7186°W | Virtue Flat | 1120503 |
| Englewood Mine | Mine | 413 ft (126 m) | 43.3539°N 124.2372°W | Coos Bay | 1157819 |
| Esmeralda Mine | Mine | 6,929 ft (2,112 m) | 44.8664°N 118.2175°W | Bourne | 1120520 |
| Esterly Mine | Mine | 1,545 ft (471 m) | 42.0783°N 123.6347°W | O'Brien | 1141899 |
| Eureka Mine | Mine | 2,444 ft (745 m) | 42.3425°N 123.7500°W | Eight Dollar Mountain | 1141915 |
| Eureka Mine | Mine | 6,240 ft (1,900 m) | 44.7097°N 118.4875°W | Greenhorn | 1141916 |
| Eureka Mine | Mine | 5,377 ft (1,639 m) | 44.7289°N 118.4725°W | Greenhorn | 1141917 |
| Evening Star Mine | Mine | 5,010 ft (1,530 m) | 43.5769°N 122.6297°W | Fairview Peak | 1134679 |
| Excuse Mine | Mine | 5,689 ft (1,734 m) | 44.8692°N 118.0339°W | Elkhorn Peak | 1120548 |
| Fall Creek Copper Mine | Mine | 1,378 ft (420 m) | 42.2997°N 123.7692°W | Pearsoll Peak | 1155700 |
| Fandora Mine | Mine | 2,569 ft (783 m) | 42.6844°N 123.2778°W | Golden | 1120619 |
| Flagstaff Mine | Mine | 3,894 ft (1,187 m) | 44.8142°N 117.7258°W | Virtue Flat | 1120821 |
| Flanagan Mine | Mine | 823 ft (251 m) | 42.4725°N 123.5011°W | Onion Mountain | 1154248 |
| Florene Mine | Mine | 2,208 ft (673 m) | 42.6853°N 123.2903°W | Golden | 1120846 |
| Footbridge Mine | Mine | 955 ft (291 m) | 45.8158°N 116.7653°W | Deadhorse Ridge | 1142293 |
| Fourmile Rock Pit | Mine | 4,186 ft (1,276 m) | 42.4353°N 122.1561°W | Lake of the Woods North | 1161703 |
| Fox Mine | Mine | 4,734 ft (1,443 m) | 44.5619°N 119.1614°W | Belshaw Meadows | 1133812 |
| Friday Mine | Mine | 3,369 ft (1,027 m) | 44.7933°N 117.6494°W | Virtue Flat | 1120995 |
| Frog Pond Mine | Mine | 4,409 ft (1,344 m) | 42.0050°N 123.5144°W | Takilma | 1142505 |
| Frozen Creek Mine | Mine | 1,654 ft (504 m) | 43.1147°N 123.2075°W | Dodson Butte | 1135709 |
| Fryes Mine | Mine | 6,279 ft (1,914 m) | 44.7081°N 118.5006°W | Greenhorn | 1167229 |
| Fuller Mine | Mine | 2,116 ft (645 m) | 42.8078°N 123.8525°W | Mount Bolivar | 1142536 |
| Gardner Mine | Mine | 3,937 ft (1,200 m) | 42.1969°N 123.9828°W | Chetco Peak | 1155738 |
| Gem Mine | Mine | 4,603 ft (1,403 m) | 44.7306°N 118.7686°W | Susanville | 1152949 |
| Gem Mine (historical) | Mine | 4,170 ft (1,270 m) | 44.8617°N 117.3581°W | Sparta | 1121092 |
| Gem Quartz Mine | Mine | 2,031 ft (619 m) | 42.1331°N 123.4675°W | Kerby Peak | 1142606 |
| Glory Hole Placer | Mine | 1,473 ft (449 m) | 42.6311°N 123.4342°W | Glendale | 1121169 |
| Goff Mine | Mine | 2,395 ft (730 m) | 42.6789°N 123.5625°W | Mount Reuben | 1121187 |
| Goff Placer | Mine | 1,417 ft (432 m) | 42.6492°N 123.4406°W | Glendale | 1121188 |
| Golconda Mine | Mine | 5,617 ft (1,712 m) | 44.8203°N 118.2147°W | Bourne | 1121189 |
| Gold Bluff Mine | Mine | 2,365 ft (721 m) | 42.9042°N 123.3178°W | Canyonville | 1121190 |
| Gold Bug Mine | Mine | 2,257 ft (688 m) | 42.6811°N 123.6122°W | Mount Reuben | 1121192 |
| Gold Bug Mine | Mine | 5,302 ft (1,616 m) | 44.8236°N 118.5433°W | Olive Lake | 1142805 |
| Gold Bug-Grizzly Mine | Mine | 5,837 ft (1,779 m) | 44.8114°N 118.3322°W | Mount Ireland | 1121193 |
| Gold Cup Placer | Mine | 2,221 ft (677 m) | 42.6467°N 123.2589°W | Golden | 1121204 |
| Gold Pan Placer Mine | Mine | 1,913 ft (583 m) | 42.1278°N 123.4681°W | Kerby Peak | 1142825 |
| Gold Plate Mine | Mine | 1,572 ft (479 m) | 42.5581°N 123.6583°W | Mount Peavine | 1142827 |
| Gold Ridge Mine | Mine | 4,275 ft (1,303 m) | 44.5228°N 117.4625°W | Durkee | 1121214 |
| Golden Boy Mine | Mine | 4,819 ft (1,469 m) | 44.6981°N 118.3858°W | Greenhorn | 1142831 |
| Golden Dreams Mine (historical) | Mine | 3,392 ft (1,034 m) | 42.2789°N 123.8358°W | Pearsoll Peak | 1154860 |
| Golden Eagle Mine | Mine | 3,671 ft (1,119 m) | 44.3764°N 117.8050°W | Wendt Butte | 1121218 |
| Golden Eagle Mine | Mine | 5,341 ft (1,628 m) | 44.6947°N 118.4708°W | Greenhorn | 1142834 |
| Golden Eagle Mine (historical) | Mine | 2,283 ft (696 m) | 42.2511°N 123.8469°W | Pearsoll Peak | 1154853 |
| Golden Gate Mine | Mine | 6,152 ft (1,875 m) | 44.7308°N 118.4856°W | Greenhorn | 1142835 |
| Golden Ring Mine | Mine | 3,287 ft (1,002 m) | 42.7031°N 123.2633°W | Golden | 1121221 |
| Golden Wedge Mine | Mine | 2,087 ft (636 m) | 42.6089°N 123.6142°W | Galice | 1142839 |
| Golden West Mine | Mine | 5,289 ft (1,612 m) | 44.3664°N 118.9297°W | Canyon Mountain | 1142840 |
| Gopher Mine | Mine | 2,306 ft (703 m) | 42.5361°N 123.3103°W | Sexton Mountain | 1121255 |
| Grand Central Mine | Mine | 7,096 ft (2,163 m) | 44.8714°N 118.2858°W | Mount Ireland | 1121284 |
| Grand Trunk Mine | Mine | 5,784 ft (1,763 m) | 44.8142°N 118.2781°W | Mount Ireland | 1121287 |
| Granite Hill Mine | Mine | 2,100 ft (640 m) | 42.4953°N 123.2650°W | Grants Pass | 1142927 |
| Gray Eagle Mine | Mine | 3,812 ft (1,162 m) | 44.8006°N 117.7442°W | Virtue Flat | 1121346 |
| Gray Eagle Mine | Mine | 4,819 ft (1,469 m) | 44.7925°N 118.4825°W | Granite | 1143003 |
| Great Northern Mine | Mine | 4,892 ft (1,491 m) | 44.3742°N 118.9217°W | Canyon Mountain | 1143018 |
| Green Rock Mine | Mine | 3,907 ft (1,191 m) | 43.6289°N 122.6414°W | Rose Hill | 1156726 |
| Greenback Mine | Mine | 2,169 ft (661 m) | 42.6536°N 123.3069°W | Golden | 1121408 |
| Griffith Placer | Mine | 5,410 ft (1,650 m) | 44.7839°N 118.3139°W | Mount Ireland | 1121434 |
| Grizzly Mine | Mine | 3,071 ft (936 m) | 42.0422°N 123.4253°W | Oregon Caves | 1143106 |
| Grubstake Mine | Mine | 4,711 ft (1,436 m) | 42.0136°N 122.9492°W | Dutchman Peak | 1143145 |
| Gutridge Mine | Mine | 4,081 ft (1,244 m) | 44.8719°N 118.5550°W | Olive Lake | 1143166 |
| Gypsy Queen Mine | Mine | 3,517 ft (1,072 m) | 42.0678°N 123.4889°W | Oregon Caves | 1134928 |
| Haggard Mine | Mine | 5,512 ft (1,680 m) | 44.3628°N 118.8792°W | Canyon Mountain | 1158273 |
| Hammersly Mine | Mine | 3,819 ft (1,164 m) | 42.6139°N 123.2592°W | Sexton Mountain | 1121543 |
| Hanna Mine | Mine | 3,330 ft (1,010 m) | 42.9658°N 123.4353°W | Nickel Mountain | 1135013 |
| Hansen Mine | Mine | 3,806 ft (1,160 m) | 42.5350°N 123.7022°W | Mount Peavine | 1143270 |
| Hardscrabble Quarry | Mine | 220 ft (67 m) | 45.3897°N 122.4592°W | Damascus | 1121595 |
| Hawkins Pit | Mine | 1,398 ft (426 m) | 45.8550°N 123.0686°W | Bacona | 1121670 |
| Helena Mine | Mine | 4,485 ft (1,367 m) | 43.5831°N 122.6131°W | Bearbones Mountain | 1143456 |
| Herculean Mine | Mine | 6,640 ft (2,020 m) | 44.8592°N 118.2772°W | Mount Ireland | 1121765 |
| Hergert Quarry | Mine | 390 ft (120 m) | 45.4683°N 123.0800°W | Laurelwood | 1121767 |
| Hervey Quarry | Mine | 597 ft (182 m) | 43.1542°N 124.1147°W | McKinley | 1121778 |
| Hidden Treasure Mine | Mine | 3,333 ft (1,016 m) | 44.7978°N 117.6686°W | Virtue Flat | 1121796 |
| Highland Mine | Mine | 6,388 ft (1,947 m) | 44.8553°N 118.1061°W | Elkhorn Peak | 1121821 |
| Horse Heaven Mine | Mine | 3,182 ft (970 m) | 44.7144°N 120.5081°W | Horse Heaven Creek | 1122002 |
| Horseshoe Lode | Mine | 2,008 ft (612 m) | 42.6786°N 123.3047°W | Golden | 1122045 |
| Howland Mine | Mine | 3,563 ft (1,086 m) | 42.5097°N 123.7161°W | Mount Peavine | 1143858 |
| Huckleberry Mine | Mine | 1,985 ft (605 m) | 42.8908°N 123.3364°W | Canyonville | 1122099 |
| Humboldt Mine | Mine | 5,013 ft (1,528 m) | 44.4258°N 117.5994°W | Mormon Basin | 1122125 |
| Humboldt Mine | Mine | 6,302 ft (1,921 m) | 44.7167°N 118.4881°W | Greenhorn | 1143902 |
| Humdinger Mine | Mine | 2,395 ft (730 m) | 42.2569°N 123.2992°W | Murphy | 1143909 |
| Humpback Mine | Mine | 5,800 ft (1,800 m) | 44.7561°N 118.4814°W | Granite | 1143912 |
| Hustis Mine (historical) | Mine | 2,228 ft (679 m) | 42.3456°N 123.7636°W | Pearsoll Peak | 1154852 |
| IXL Mine | Mine | 6,293 ft (1,918 m) | 44.7169°N 118.4917°W | Greenhorn | 1143975 |
| Ibex Mine | Mine | 6,204 ft (1,891 m) | 44.8125°N 118.2992°W | Mount Ireland | 1122180 |
| Ida Mine | Mine | 2,215 ft (675 m) | 42.4947°N 123.2539°W | Grants Pass | 1143979 |
| Idol City Mines | Mine | 5,679 ft (1,731 m) | 43.7783°N 118.8942°W | Devine Ridge North | 1143984 |
| Imperial Eagle Mine | Mine | 7,011 ft (2,137 m) | 44.8642°N 118.2719°W | Mount Ireland | 1116711 |
| Independence Mine | Mine | 5,410 ft (1,650 m) | 44.8519°N 118.4069°W | Granite | 1144013 |
| Independence Mine | Mine | 364 ft (111 m) | 42.6289°N 124.0581°W | Illahe | 1161651 |
| Independent Mine | Mine | 5,686 ft (1,733 m) | 44.3425°N 120.3536°W | Lookout Mountain | 1144014 |
| Inman Mine | Mine | 177 ft (54 m) | 42.8044°N 124.3042°W | Mount Butler | 1144100 |
| Iowa Mine | Mine | 230 ft (70 m) | 43.1086°N 124.3697°W | Bill Peak | 1639061 |
| Iron Door Mine | Mine | 5,039 ft (1,536 m) | 44.4619°N 117.6686°W | Bridgeport | 1122269 |
| Iron King Mine | Mine | 5,568 ft (1,697 m) | 44.3539°N 118.9222°W | Canyon Mountain | 1122271 |
| Irondyke Mine | Mine | 2,228 ft (679 m) | 45.0269°N 116.8575°W | Homestead | 1159227 |
| Ironside Mine | Mine | 3,150 ft (960 m) | 43.9189°N 122.3758°W | Sardine Butte | 1158297 |
| Ivy May Mine | Mine | 7,428 ft (2,264 m) | 44.8694°N 118.2708°W | Mount Ireland | 1122306 |
| J C L Mine | Mine | 1,483 ft (452 m) | 42.6578°N 123.6225°W | Mount Reuben | 1122307 |
| Jackpot Mine | Mine | 2,060 ft (630 m) | 42.6900°N 123.3250°W | Golden | 1122347 |
| Jay Bird Mine | Mine | 2,972 ft (906 m) | 42.0936°N 123.1447°W | Carberry Creek | 1116530 |
| Jay Bird Mine | Mine | 4,760 ft (1,450 m) | 44.8025°N 118.4761°W | Granite | 1144230 |
| Jewett Mine | Mine | 2,178 ft (664 m) | 42.4047°N 123.2831°W | Grants Pass | 1135768 |
| Jim Blaine Mine | Mine | 2,057 ft (627 m) | 42.6425°N 123.3106°W | Golden | 1122424 |
| John Long Placer Mine | Mine | 3,386 ft (1,032 m) | 44.3867°N 118.9422°W | John Day | 1144306 |
| Jones Marble Quarry | Mine | 2,618 ft (798 m) | 42.2233°N 123.3358°W | Williams | 1135394 |
| Joseph Mountain Mines | Mine | 7,497 ft (2,285 m) | 45.3031°N 117.2678°W | Chief Joseph Mountain | 1144408 |
| Keeney Mine | Mine | 4,921 ft (1,500 m) | 44.8672°N 118.7897°W | Sharp Ridge | 1144508 |
| Kell Mine | Mine | 1,713 ft (522 m) | 42.4697°N 123.0189°W | Gold Hill | 1135715 |
| Kelly Mine | Mine | 7,680 ft (2,340 m) | 44.8528°N 118.1853°W | Bourne | 1122672 |
| Kester Mine | Mine | 2,661 ft (811 m) | 42.0644°N 123.4297°W | Oregon Caves | 1144575 |
| Keystone Mine | Mine | 2,438 ft (743 m) | 44.7814°N 117.3089°W | Sparta | 1122717 |
| Keystone Mine | Mine | 4,708 ft (1,435 m) | 44.5481°N 118.7033°W | Dixie Meadows | 1144592 |
| Klickitat Quarry | Mine | 1,909 ft (582 m) | 44.2336°N 123.9178°W | Cummins Peak | 1135738 |
| Klopp Placer Mine | Mine | 5,272 ft (1,607 m) | 44.9125°N 118.4044°W | Trout Meadows | 1144675 |
| Kriska Mine | Mine | 4,797 ft (1,462 m) | 42.5800°N 118.5442°W | Alvord Hot Springs | 1638790 |
| Kuhnert Quarry | Mine | 384 ft (117 m) | 43.4406°N 124.1111°W | Allegany | 1122859 |
| Labellevue Mine | Mine | 6,896 ft (2,102 m) | 44.8889°N 118.3361°W | Crawfish Lake | 1144729 |
| Lady Frances Mine | Mine | 1,732 ft (528 m) | 45.0386°N 121.1206°W | Dant | 1130930 |
| Lamb Mine | Mine | 4,852 ft (1,479 m) | 42.1289°N 122.7122°W | Ashland | 1155147 |
| Lampa Mine | Mine | 105 ft (32 m) | 43.1108°N 124.2989°W | Bill Peak | 1639059 |
| Last Chance Mine | Mine | 6,922 ft (2,110 m) | 45.0231°N 117.2186°W | Cornucopia | 1116549 |
| Last Chance Mine | Mine | 7,342 ft (2,238 m) | 44.8706°N 118.2647°W | Mount Ireland | 1122968 |
| Laurel Quarry (historical) | Mine | 351 ft (107 m) | 45.4156°N 123.0147°W | Laurelwood | 1158002 |
| Lava Crossing Cinder Pit | Mine | 4,990 ft (1,520 m) | 43.5914°N 121.0125°W | South Ice Cave | 1954379 |
| Lavenik Cinder Pit | Mine | 5,079 ft (1,548 m) | 42.4178°N 121.6317°W | Swan Lake Point | 1167679 |
| Layton Mine | Mine | 2,362 ft (720 m) | 42.2275°N 123.2281°W | Tallowbox Mountain | 1158317 |
| Lead Lode Mine | Mine | 6,821 ft (2,079 m) | 44.8728°N 118.2969°W | Mount Ireland | 1123013 |
| Legore Mine | Mine | 7,615 ft (2,321 m) | 45.3122°N 117.3358°W | Chief Joseph Mountain | 1144927 |
| Levens Ledge Mine | Mine | 1,880 ft (570 m) | 42.9100°N 123.3125°W | Canyonville | 1123052 |
| Libby Mine | Mine | 121 ft (37 m) | 43.3433°N 124.2475°W | Coos Bay | 1123064 |
| Lightning Creek Placers | Mine | 5,321 ft (1,622 m) | 44.7531°N 118.4969°W | Granite | 1145001 |
| Liston Lake Mine | Mine | 5,262 ft (1,604 m) | 44.6683°N 118.4939°W | Greenhorn | 1145061 |
| Little Blue Mine | Mine | 5,203 ft (1,586 m) | 44.7681°N 118.4933°W | Granite | 1145104 |
| Little Doe Mine | Mine | 6,489 ft (1,978 m) | 44.6928°N 118.5725°W | Vinegar Hill | 1155466 |
| Little Giant Mine | Mine | 1,847 ft (563 m) | 42.3814°N 123.1214°W | Gold Hill | 1135727 |
| Little Jim Mine | Mine | 2,513 ft (766 m) | 42.1353°N 123.4708°W | Kerby Peak | 1145188 |
| Little Queen Mine | Mine | 4,577 ft (1,395 m) | 42.0717°N 117.7522°W | Boghole Spring | 1134293 |
| Little Siberia Mine | Mine | 3,494 ft (1,065 m) | 42.2761°N 123.8303°W | Pearsoll Peak | 1154851 |
| Loa Mae Mine | Mine | 6,640 ft (2,020 m) | 44.8800°N 118.2839°W | Crawfish Lake | 1145307 |
| Lone Pine Quarry | Mine | 4,344 ft (1,324 m) | 42.5592°N 121.6325°W | S'Ocholis Canyon | 1135936 |
| Lone Star Mine (historical) | Mine | 2,926 ft (892 m) | 44.8192°N 117.3661°W | Sparta | 1123389 |
| Long Rifle Cinder Pit | Mine | 4,304 ft (1,312 m) | 42.4081°N 122.0594°W | Pelican Bay | 1135155 |
| Lost Buck Mine | Mine | 5,449 ft (1,661 m) | 44.8386°N 118.3886°W | Granite | 1145497 |
| Lost Creek Cinder Pit | Mine | 5,430 ft (1,660 m) | 42.4881°N 122.1886°W | Lake of the Woods North | 1156880 |
| Loughs Mine | Mine | 2,900 ft (880 m) | 43.3064°N 122.6483°W | Steamboat | 1145572 |
| Lower Baisley-Elkhorn Mine | Mine | 5,292 ft (1,613 m) | 44.8475°N 118.0572°W | Elkhorn Peak | 1123554 |
| Loy Mine | Mine | 7,375 ft (2,248 m) | 44.8819°N 118.2222°W | Anthony Lakes | 1123600 |
| Lucky Boy Mine | Mine | 3,179 ft (969 m) | 44.2119°N 122.3456°W | Blue River | 1123607 |
| Lucky Boy Mine | Mine | 2,274 ft (693 m) | 42.2581°N 123.0414°W | Mount Isabelle | 1132821 |
| Lucky Lass Mine | Mine | 6,165 ft (1,879 m) | 42.3358°N 120.5406°W | Cox Flat | 1145663 |
| Lucky Queen Mine | Mine | 1,585 ft (483 m) | 42.5800°N 123.3356°W | Sexton Mountain | 1123610 |
| Lucky Strike Mine | Mine | 5,433 ft (1,656 m) | 42.0167°N 123.4653°W | Oregon Caves | 1145667 |
| Lucky Strike Mine | Mine | 5,007 ft (1,526 m) | 44.5175°N 120.4972°W | Stephenson Mountain | 1145668 |
| Luethye Mine | Mine | 3,704 ft (1,129 m) | 42.0661°N 123.4864°W | Oregon Caves | 1145672 |
| Lyman Mine | Mine | 1,755 ft (535 m) | 42.4675°N 123.0222°W | Gold Hill | 1135713 |
| Mabel L Mine | Mine | 2,858 ft (871 m) | 45.7919°N 116.7769°W | Deadhorse Ridge | 1145702 |
| MacAbee Mine | Mine | 2,451 ft (747 m) | 42.6822°N 123.3167°W | Golden | 1123656 |
| Macy Mine | Mine | 2,556 ft (779 m) | 44.8058°N 117.3044°W | Sparta | 1123669 |
| Magnolia Mine | Mine | 5,315 ft (1,620 m) | 44.8592°N 118.4022°W | Granite | 1145733 |
| Maid of the Mist Mine | Mine | 2,316 ft (706 m) | 42.2047°N 123.1781°W | Tallowbox Mountain | 1145752 |
| Maidens Dream Mine | Mine | 6,161 ft (1,878 m) | 44.7853°N 118.2867°W | Mount Ireland | 1123697 |
| Mammoth Lode Mine | Mine | 4,541 ft (1,384 m) | 42.7622°N 122.9511°W | Richter Mountain | 1145780 |
| Mammoth Mine | Mine | 6,496 ft (1,980 m) | 44.8219°N 118.2586°W | Mount Ireland | 1123723 |
| Marks-Thompson Mine | Mine | 4,665 ft (1,422 m) | 44.3708°N 118.7453°W | Strawberry Mountain | 1145820 |
| Martha Mine | Mine | 2,559 ft (780 m) | 42.6697°N 123.3067°W | Golden | 1123802 |
| Marysville Placer | Mine | 3,855 ft (1,175 m) | 44.3833°N 118.9247°W | John Day | 1145862 |
| Maude- S Mine | Mine | 2,333 ft (711 m) | 43.0147°N 122.9300°W | Deadman Mountain | 1145880 |
| Maury Mountain Mines | Mine | 4,003 ft (1,220 m) | 44.1072°N 120.4328°W | Mule Deer Ridge | 1145883 |
| Maxwell Mine | Mine | 7,083 ft (2,159 m) | 44.8550°N 118.0983°W | Elkhorn Peak | 1123858 |
| May Queen Mine | Mine | 4,862 ft (1,482 m) | 44.8039°N 118.4797°W | Granite | 1145894 |
| Mayflower Mine | Mine | 3,379 ft (1,030 m) | 43.5703°N 122.5939°W | Bearbones Mountain | 1145896 |
| McKinley Mine | Mine | 3,081 ft (939 m) | 42.4092°N 124.2964°W | Signal Buttes | 1132624 |
| Michigan Mine | Mine | 1,362 ft (415 m) | 42.3494°N 123.3078°W | Murphy | 1146126 |
| Middle Camp Baisley-Elkhorn Mine | Mine | 6,010 ft (1,830 m) | 44.8567°N 118.0650°W | Elkhorn Peak | 1124087 |
| Mildred Mine | Mine | 3,714 ft (1,132 m) | 42.7411°N 123.1733°W | King Mountain | 1164042 |
| Mile High Mine | Mine | 7,539 ft (2,298 m) | 44.8503°N 118.2900°W | Mount Ireland | 1124136 |
| Miller Mine | Mine | 2,989 ft (911 m) | 42.3536°N 123.2169°W | Applegate | 1135259 |
| Miller Mine | Mine | 2,018 ft (615 m) | 42.8817°N 123.1214°W | Milo | 1146279 |
| Miller Mountain Mine | Mine | 4,711 ft (1,436 m) | 44.3433°N 118.9750°W | Canyon Mountain | 1146283 |
| Millionaire Mine | Mine | 1,690 ft (520 m) | 42.4025°N 122.9956°W | Sams Valley | 1132764 |
| Mine Creek Placer Mine | Mine | 4,813 ft (1,467 m) | 44.5581°N 119.1619°W | Belshaw Meadows | 1133813 |
| Mineral Wonder Mine | Mine | 4,715 ft (1,437 m) | 44.8000°N 118.4739°W | Granite | 1146317 |
| Minnie May Mine | Mine | 2,415 ft (736 m) | 44.8000°N 117.3092°W | Sparta | 1124244 |
| Miser Mine | Mine | 2,356 ft (718 m) | 42.7483°N 123.1969°W | King Mountain | 1164043 |
| Molly Gibson Mine | Mine | 7,103 ft (2,165 m) | 44.8658°N 118.2497°W | Bourne | 1124284 |
| Molly Hill Mine | Mine | 3,399 ft (1,036 m) | 42.6722°N 123.6047°W | Mount Reuben | 1124285 |
| Molly Mine | Mine | 2,067 ft (630 m) | 42.3886°N 123.1164°W | Gold Hill | 1135729 |
| Monohon Tunnel Mine | Mine | 5,233 ft (1,595 m) | 44.4353°N 117.6103°W | Mormon Basin | 1124291 |
| Monumental Mine | Mine | 6,696 ft (2,041 m) | 44.8608°N 118.3494°W | Mount Ireland | 1124311 |
| Mormon Boy Mine | Mine | 7,237 ft (2,206 m) | 44.8656°N 118.2578°W | Mount Ireland | 1124364 |
| Morning Glory Mine | Mine | 5,272 ft (1,607 m) | 44.6928°N 118.4736°W | Greenhorn | 1146463 |
| Morning Mine | Mine | 2,218 ft (676 m) | 42.6914°N 123.3236°W | Golden | 1124365 |
| Morning Mine | Mine | 6,414 ft (1,955 m) | 44.6950°N 118.5564°W | Vinegar Hill | 1146464 |
| Morning Star Mine | Mine | 6,893 ft (2,101 m) | 44.8189°N 118.2492°W | Bourne | 1158382 |
| Morris Mine | Mine | 7,405 ft (2,257 m) | 44.7242°N 118.5700°W | Vinegar Hill | 1146471 |
| Mountain Belle Mine | Mine | 5,515 ft (1,681 m) | 44.8156°N 118.2253°W | Bourne | 1124419 |
| Mountain Chief Mine | Mine | 1,083 ft (330 m) | 45.8150°N 116.7631°W | Deadhorse Ridge | 1146537 |
| Mountain King Mine | Mine | 2,621 ft (799 m) | 42.5689°N 122.9956°W | Boswell Mountain | 1124423 |
| Mountain Lion Mine | Mine | 1,470 ft (450 m) | 42.3250°N 123.2464°W | Applegate | 1124424 |
| Mountain View Mine | Mine | 7,274 ft (2,217 m) | 44.8650°N 118.2014°W | Bourne | 1124431 |
| Mountain View Mine | Mine | 4,813 ft (1,467 m) | 42.0744°N 123.2517°W | Grayback Mountain | 1134125 |
| Murry Mine | Mine | 3,730 ft (1,140 m) | 42.4631°N 123.6075°W | Onion Mountain | 1146686 |
| Musick Mine | Mine | 4,974 ft (1,516 m) | 43.5792°N 122.6528°W | Fairview Peak | 1146694 |
| New Mine | Mine | 5,945 ft (1,812 m) | 44.3597°N 118.8789°W | Canyon Mountain | 1167104 |
| New York Mine | Mine | 5,029 ft (1,533 m) | 44.8456°N 118.4028°W | Granite | 1146804 |
| Newcastle Mine | Mine | 69 ft (21 m) | 43.3039°N 124.1233°W | Daniels Creek | 1132550 |
| Nonpareil Mine | Mine | 732 ft (223 m) | 43.4125°N 123.1647°W | Nonpareil | 1135133 |
| Noonday Mine | Mine | 5,177 ft (1,578 m) | 43.5781°N 122.6156°W | Bearbones Mountain | 1146873 |
| North Fork Quarry | Mine | 331 ft (101 m) | 44.1428°N 124.0567°W | Heceta Head | 1159250 |
| North Pole Mine | Mine | 7,024 ft (2,141 m) | 44.8425°N 118.1942°W | Bourne | 1124832 |
| North Star Mine | Mine | 3,983 ft (1,214 m) | 44.2333°N 122.3447°W | Blue River | 1124845 |
| Oak Mine | Mine | 1,673 ft (510 m) | 42.5525°N 123.3025°W | Sexton Mountain | 1134914 |
| Oak Ranch Pit | Mine | 1,112 ft (339 m) | 45.9444°N 123.0883°W | Baker Point | 1124914 |
| Ochoco Agate Beds | Mine | 6,047 ft (1,843 m) | 44.5000°N 120.4581°W | Stephenson Mountain | 1147139 |
| Ochoco Mine | Mine | 4,770 ft (1,450 m) | 44.4256°N 120.3597°W | Ochoco Butte | 1158402 |
| Odessa Cinder Pit | Mine | 4,199 ft (1,280 m) | 42.4089°N 122.0561°W | Pelican Bay | 1135156 |
| Ogle Mountain Mine | Mine | 2,782 ft (848 m) | 44.8917°N 122.3342°W | Rooster Rock | 1147168 |
| Old Channel Mine | Mine | 1,598 ft (487 m) | 42.5753°N 123.6144°W | Galice | 1147187 |
| Old Glory Mine | Mine | 1,404 ft (428 m) | 42.4600°N 123.8236°W | York Butte | 1147195 |
| Old Red Mine | Mine | 1,752 ft (534 m) | 42.7544°N 123.8989°W | Eden Valley | 1147206 |
| Opalite Mine | Mine | 5,348 ft (1,630 m) | 42.0525°N 118.0353°W | Payne Creek | 1134181 |
| Ophir Mine | Mine | 6,972 ft (2,125 m) | 44.8586°N 118.3269°W | Mount Ireland | 1125012 |
| Ophir Mine | Mine | 6,207 ft (1,892 m) | 44.7114°N 118.4853°W | Greenhorn | 1147253 |
| Oregon Belle Mine | Mine | 3,307 ft (1,008 m) | 42.2908°N 123.1031°W | Mount Isabelle | 1125019 |
| Oregon Bonanza Mine | Mine | 2,434 ft (742 m) | 42.2800°N 123.2875°W | Murphy | 1147258 |
| Oregon Chief Mine | Mine | 4,941 ft (1,506 m) | 44.4239°N 117.5433°W | Mormon Basin | 1125021 |
| Oregon Chief Mine | Mine | 7,382 ft (2,250 m) | 44.8503°N 118.2856°W | Mount Ireland | 1125022 |
| Oregon King Mine | Mine | 2,654 ft (809 m) | 44.7547°N 120.7414°W | Donnybrook | 1125027 |
| Oregon Mine | Mine | 5,102 ft (1,555 m) | 44.2911°N 119.2950°W | Big Weasel Springs | 1135818 |
| Oremite Mine | Mine | 2,569 ft (783 m) | 44.3558°N 121.2944°W | Cline Falls | 1125039 |
| Oriole Mine | Mine | 1,493 ft (455 m) | 42.5911°N 123.6094°W | Galice | 1147271 |
| Orion Mine | Mine | 5,111 ft (1,558 m) | 44.3778°N 118.2808°W | Rail Gulch | 1147272 |
| Oro Grande Mine | Mine | 3,107 ft (947 m) | 42.6675°N 123.2919°W | Golden | 1134141 |
| Orofino Mine | Mine | 2,953 ft (900 m) | 42.5497°N 123.2711°W | Sexton Mountain | 1125046 |
| Orofino Mine | Mine | 5,226 ft (1,593 m) | 44.7478°N 118.4750°W | Greenhorn | 1158409 |
| Overland Mine | Mine | 105 ft (32 m) | 43.2492°N 124.2433°W | Coquille | 1125071 |
| Overshot Group Mine | Mine | 5,348 ft (1,630 m) | 44.4400°N 117.6136°W | Mormon Basin | 1125074 |
| Owl Hollow Mine | Mine | 2,572 ft (784 m) | 42.3906°N 123.2011°W | Rogue River | 1125086 |
| Owl Mine | Mine | 6,096 ft (1,858 m) | 44.7161°N 118.4792°W | Greenhorn | 1147315 |
| PYX Mine | Mine | 5,800 ft (1,800 m) | 44.7269°N 118.4469°W | Greenhorn | 1158411 |
| Paradise Mine | Mine | 3,028 ft (923 m) | 42.2172°N 123.4153°W | Kerby Peak | 1147419 |
| Paradise Mine Number 1 | Mine | 3,684 ft (1,123 m) | 42.2100°N 123.4164°W | Kerby Peak | 1134057 |
| Parkerville Mine | Mine | 4,984 ft (1,519 m) | 44.6889°N 118.4236°W | Greenhorn | 1147463 |
| Payne Placer | Mine | 1,516 ft (462 m) | 42.6842°N 123.3508°W | Golden | 1125250 |
| Pearsoll Mine | Mine | 4,741 ft (1,445 m) | 42.2975°N 123.8442°W | Pearsoll Peak | 1155697 |
| Peck Mine | Mine | 2,241 ft (683 m) | 42.2511°N 123.8461°W | Pearsoll Peak | 1155699 |
| Pelican Cinder Pit | Mine | 4,262 ft (1,299 m) | 42.4414°N 122.1150°W | Pelican Bay | 1135153 |
| Penny Ante Mine | Mine | 2,047 ft (624 m) | 42.5997°N 123.2122°W | Wimer | 1162485 |
| Phoenix Mine | Mine | 6,158 ft (1,877 m) | 44.7050°N 118.4853°W | Greenhorn | 1147643 |
| Pix Mine | Mine | 3,671 ft (1,119 m) | 42.7344°N 123.5789°W | Mount Reuben | 1159159 |
| Placer Mine | Mine | 1,867 ft (569 m) | 42.1089°N 123.1044°W | Squaw Lakes | 1147789 |
| Ponyshoe Mine | Mine | 4,819 ft (1,469 m) | 42.0036°N 123.5028°W | Takilma | 1147877 |
| Poor Boy Mine | Mine | 4,701 ft (1,433 m) | 44.8025°N 118.4725°W | Granite | 1147886 |
| Poorman Mine | Mine | 3,717 ft (1,133 m) | 44.9192°N 117.4636°W | Balm Creek Reservoir | 1147888 |
| Portland Mine | Mine | 7,228 ft (2,203 m) | 44.7369°N 118.6139°W | Vinegar Hill | 1152978 |
| Potato Patch Mine | Mine | 3,812 ft (1,162 m) | 44.3797°N 118.9911°W | John Day | 1147938 |
| Priday Agate Beds | Mine | 2,897 ft (883 m) | 44.7372°N 120.9072°W | Teller Butte | 1147996 |
| Quartzmill Mine | Mine | 2,106 ft (642 m) | 42.7372°N 123.2469°W | King Mountain | 1164044 |
| Quebec Mine | Mine | 5,853 ft (1,784 m) | 44.7608°N 118.4864°W | Granite | 1148099 |
| Queen Mine | Mine | 5,348 ft (1,630 m) | 45.0392°N 117.2178°W | Cornucopia | 1125744 |
| Queen Oregon Mines | Mine | 3,389 ft (1,033 m) | 44.7600°N 120.6125°W | Arrastra Butte | 1125745 |
| Queen of the West Mine | Mine | 7,746 ft (2,361 m) | 45.0325°N 117.2258°W | Cornucopia | 1116550 |
| Rabbit Hole Mine | Mine | 4,846 ft (1,477 m) | 42.1989°N 118.6778°W | Ladycomb Peak | 1160316 |
| Rabbit Mine | Mine | 6,024 ft (1,836 m) | 44.7119°N 118.4775°W | Greenhorn | 1148124 |
| Rachel Mine | Mine | 4,019 ft (1,225 m) | 44.7939°N 117.7292°W | Virtue Flat | 1125768 |
| Rainbow Mine | Mine | 5,216 ft (1,590 m) | 44.4222°N 117.5578°W | Mormon Basin | 1125785 |
| Rainbow Mine | Mine | 2,434 ft (742 m) | 42.1089°N 123.4811°W | Oregon Caves | 1148173 |
| Rainbow Quarry | Mine | 2,762 ft (842 m) | 45.0614°N 121.3944°W | Foreman Point | 1125786 |
| Rainbow Quarry | Mine | 2,864 ft (873 m) | 45.0164°N 121.2642°W | Wapinitia | 1148175 |
| Ramsey Mine | Mine | 3,783 ft (1,153 m) | 42.0217°N 123.5286°W | Takilma | 1148194 |
| Ramsey Mine | Mine | 2,493 ft (760 m) | 42.4194°N 123.6000°W | Onion Mountain | 1148195 |
| Ranes & Borger Mine | Mine | 4,423 ft (1,348 m) | 44.6956°N 118.2742°W | Whitney | 1148205 |
| Ray Mine | Mine | 6,998 ft (2,133 m) | 44.3400°N 118.7700°W | Pine Creek Mountain | 1148255 |
| Record Mine | Mine | 5,315 ft (1,620 m) | 44.3775°N 118.2464°W | Unity | 1148269 |
| Red Bird Mine | Mine | 6,001 ft (1,829 m) | 44.7142°N 118.4764°W | Greenhorn | 1148271 |
| Red Boy Mine | Mine | 4,747 ft (1,447 m) | 44.7950°N 118.4772°W | Granite | 1148275 |
| Red Chief Mine | Mine | 6,765 ft (2,062 m) | 44.8608°N 118.2689°W | Mount Ireland | 1125874 |
| Red Cloud Mine | Mine | 4,065 ft (1,239 m) | 42.7769°N 122.9456°W | Richter Mountain | 1148283 |
| Red Mountain Mine | Mine | 4,695 ft (1,431 m) | 44.8050°N 118.4678°W | Granite | 1148323 |
| Red Rock Quarry | Mine | 2,690 ft (820 m) | 44.0417°N 117.4233°W | Hope Butte | 1125902 |
| Red Rose Mine | Mine | 3,025 ft (922 m) | 42.2492°N 123.3272°W | Williams | 1135395 |
| Redjacket Mine | Mine | 2,297 ft (700 m) | 42.4869°N 123.2706°W | Grants Pass | 1148345 |
| Reed Mine | Mine | 2,254 ft (687 m) | 42.6750°N 123.3028°W | Golden | 1125924 |
| Reed Mine | Mine | 5,964 ft (1,818 m) | 44.7194°N 118.6608°W | Boulder Butte | 1156696 |
| Reno Mine | Mine | 1,608 ft (490 m) | 42.6644°N 123.6408°W | Bunker Creek | 1125951 |
| Rialto Mine | Mine | 4,186 ft (1,276 m) | 44.2244°N 122.3372°W | Blue River | 1125969 |
| Rob Roy Mine | Mine | 7,506 ft (2,288 m) | 44.8683°N 118.2897°W | Mount Ireland | 1126103 |
| Roba Brothers Mine | Mine | 5,594 ft (1,705 m) | 44.1992°N 119.2856°W | Flagtail Mountain | 1148529 |
| Roba Westfall Mine | Mine | 5,305 ft (1,617 m) | 44.2103°N 119.2836°W | Flagtail Mountain | 1148533 |
| Roberts Mine | Mine | 5,945 ft (1,812 m) | 44.6917°N 118.5111°W | Vinegar Hill | 1116599 |
| Robertson Mine | Mine | 1,355 ft (413 m) | 42.3444°N 123.7717°W | Pearsoll Peak | 1148540 |
| Rosalite Mine | Mine | 5,925 ft (1,806 m) | 42.3000°N 120.7331°W | Cougar Peak | 1131014 |
| Rose Mine | Mine | 440 ft (130 m) | 43.2219°N 124.3414°W | Riverton | 1161161 |
| Rosebud Mine | Mine | 4,203 ft (1,281 m) | 44.8689°N 117.3392°W | Sparta | 1126296 |
| Round Mountain Mine | Mine | 5,630 ft (1,720 m) | 44.3925°N 120.3286°W | Ochoco Butte | 1148791 |
| Rowden Mine | Mine | 2,100 ft (640 m) | 42.2922°N 123.2086°W | Applegate | 1159274 |
| Rowley Mine | Mine | 2,992 ft (912 m) | 42.8156°N 122.9439°W | Richter Mountain | 1148815 |
| Royal Purple Mine | Mine | 6,421 ft (1,957 m) | 45.2528°N 117.1972°W | Joseph | 1157043 |
| Royal White Mine | Mine | 6,253 ft (1,906 m) | 44.7261°N 118.4817°W | Greenhorn | 1148819 |
| Ruby Creek Mines | Mine | 5,597 ft (1,706 m) | 44.7794°N 118.4906°W | Granite | 1148827 |
| Ruby Mine | Mine | 2,677 ft (816 m) | 44.7531°N 120.7392°W | Donnybrook | 1126351 |
| Rustler Mine | Mine | 2,697 ft (822 m) | 45.7911°N 116.7758°W | Deadhorse Ridge | 1148862 |
| Saint Paul Mine | Mine | 3,812 ft (1,162 m) | 44.7553°N 117.6822°W | Virtue Flat | 1126488 |
| Sanger Mine | Mine | 4,747 ft (1,447 m) | 44.9792°N 117.4178°W | Balm Creek Reservoir | 1149065 |
| Scandia Tunnel | Mine | 5,249 ft (1,600 m) | 44.7703°N 118.4900°W | Granite | 1149111 |
| Schonchin Cinder Pit | Mine | 5,259 ft (1,603 m) | 42.3664°N 121.4336°W | Yonna | 1161704 |
| Schwayder Mine | Mine | 6,079 ft (1,853 m) | 44.3708°N 118.2300°W | Rastus Mountain | 1149152 |
| Seven Devils Mine | Mine | 292 ft (89 m) | 43.2428°N 124.3483°W | Riverton | 1638811 |
| Seven-Thirty Mine | Mine | 2,874 ft (876 m) | 42.6222°N 123.6197°W | Galice | 1149255 |
| Shasta Mine | Mine | 1,808 ft (551 m) | 42.4008°N 123.2117°W | Rogue River | 1135253 |
| Shatt Mine | Mine | 4,675 ft (1,425 m) | 44.5264°N 118.6950°W | Dixie Meadows | 1155462 |
| Shot Mine | Mine | 2,867 ft (874 m) | 42.6642°N 123.3036°W | Golden | 1126926 |
| Silent Friend Mine | Mine | 3,268 ft (996 m) | 42.6992°N 123.2781°W | Golden | 1126954 |
| Silver Dick Mine | Mine | 5,148 ft (1,569 m) | 44.8117°N 118.2164°W | Bourne | 1126967 |
| Silver Dollar Cinder Pit | Mine | 5,282 ft (1,610 m) | 42.7167°N 121.3294°W | Silver Dollar Flat | 1155795 |
| Silver King Mine | Mine | 1,886 ft (575 m) | 44.8489°N 122.3397°W | Elkhorn | 1135500 |
| Silver Star Mine | Mine | 1,913 ft (583 m) | 44.8586°N 122.2792°W | Elkhorn | 1149509 |
| Silver Tip Mine | Mine | 3,599 ft (1,097 m) | 42.2372°N 123.3661°W | Williams | 1149511 |
| Silvers Mine | Mine | 3,648 ft (1,112 m) | 44.4397°N 119.0217°W | Mount Vernon | 1149512 |
| Skinner Mine | Mine | 6,201 ft (1,890 m) | 44.8378°N 118.6664°W | Desolation Butte | 1149597 |
| Skyline Mine | Mine | 4,770 ft (1,450 m) | 42.1536°N 122.7472°W | Ashland | 1149653 |
| Sleppy Mine | Mine | 3,986 ft (1,215 m) | 42.2128°N 122.8811°W | Sterling Creek | 1149678 |
| Sluter Mine | Mine | 2,359 ft (719 m) | 42.7169°N 123.2631°W | Golden | 1127096 |
| Smith-Powers Mine | Mine | 315 ft (96 m) | 43.2678°N 124.1844°W | Coos Bay | 1132559 |
| Smithwick Haydite Quarry | Mine | 938 ft (286 m) | 45.7606°N 123.2022°W | Vernonia | 2556262 |
| Smuggler Mine | Mine | 4,642 ft (1,415 m) | 44.5497°N 118.6794°W | Dixie Meadows | 1155461 |
| Snake River Mine | Mine | 3,711 ft (1,131 m) | 44.5894°N 117.1483°W | Connor Creek | 1127152 |
| Snow Bird Mine | Mine | 3,094 ft (943 m) | 42.2567°N 123.3119°W | Murphy | 1135003 |
| Soda Mine | Mine | 4,258 ft (1,298 m) | 42.9694°N 120.0400°W | Alkali Lake | 1130980 |
| South Ice Cave Cinder Pit | Mine | 5,115 ft (1,559 m) | 43.5750°N 121.0950°W | South Ice Cave | 1954380 |
| South Pole Mine | Mine | 6,939 ft (2,115 m) | 44.8553°N 118.1769°W | Bourne | 1127337 |
| Southport Mine | Mine | 190 ft (58 m) | 43.3025°N 124.2214°W | Coos Bay | 1127361 |
| Speaker Placer | Mine | 1,729 ft (527 m) | 42.7117°N 123.3103°W | Golden | 1127375 |
| Spotted Fawn Mine | Mine | 3,091 ft (942 m) | 42.6883°N 123.2728°W | Golden | 1127401 |
| Stalter Mine | Mine | 6,158 ft (1,877 m) | 44.7094°N 118.6400°W | Boulder Butte | 1150329 |
| Standard Mine | Mine | 4,593 ft (1,400 m) | 44.5456°N 118.6817°W | Dixie Meadows | 1150333 |
| Standard Mine | Mine | 6,109 ft (1,862 m) | 44.8828°N 118.3717°W | Crawfish Lake | 1150334 |
| Star Mine | Mine | 2,769 ft (844 m) | 42.2111°N 123.2144°W | Tallowbox Mountain | 1127535 |
| Star Mine | Mine | 1,503 ft (458 m) | 42.6300°N 123.3128°W | Golden | 1127536 |
| Star Mine | Mine | 3,192 ft (973 m) | 43.5594°N 122.7042°W | Fairview Peak | 1134683 |
| Starvout Creek Mines | Mine | 3,445 ft (1,050 m) | 42.7331°N 123.2025°W | King Mountain | 1130356 |
| Steam Beer Placer | Mine | 1,093 ft (333 m) | 42.6422°N 123.4492°W | Glendale | 1127555 |
| Steamboat Mine | Mine | 3,258 ft (993 m) | 42.0811°N 123.1992°W | Carberry Creek | 1150378 |
| Stithum Mine | Mine | 4,610 ft (1,410 m) | 44.6361°N 118.6967°W | Boulder Butte | 1150441 |
| Strasburg Mine | Mine | 4,987 ft (1,520 m) | 44.7575°N 118.4644°W | Granite | 1150472 |
| Stroubs Mine | Mine | 2,805 ft (855 m) | 43.2125°N 122.5431°W | Twin Lakes Mountain | 1150497 |
| Stub Mine | Mine | 6,024 ft (1,836 m) | 44.7639°N 117.9572°W | Wingville | 1127666 |
| Sturgis Mine | Mine | 1,900 ft (580 m) | 42.2806°N 123.0450°W | Mount Isabelle | 1127682 |
| Sugar Pine Mine | Mine | 1,654 ft (504 m) | 42.5597°N 123.6411°W | Mount Peavine | 1150540 |
| Summit Mine | Mine | 5,134 ft (1,565 m) | 44.4253°N 117.5617°W | Mormon Basin | 1127717 |
| Sunnybrook Mine | Mine | 6,982 ft (2,128 m) | 44.8431°N 118.2969°W | Mount Ireland | 1127730 |
| Sunset Mine | Mine | 3,120 ft (950 m) | 42.7072°N 123.2614°W | Golden | 1127752 |
| Sunshine Mine | Mine | 610 ft (190 m) | 42.7136°N 124.3053°W | Father Mountain | 1154676 |
| Sunstone Mine | Mine | 4,606 ft (1,404 m) | 42.7167°N 119.8636°W | Rabbit Hills NE | 1131206 |
| Sweetbriar Mine | Mine | 1,854 ft (565 m) | 42.8958°N 123.3258°W | Canyonville | 1127835 |
| Sylvanite Mine | Mine | 1,365 ft (416 m) | 42.4633°N 123.0228°W | Gold Hill | 1135712 |
| Tabor Diggings | Mine | 4,455 ft (1,358 m) | 44.8311°N 118.4594°W | Granite | 1150831 |
| Tempest Mine | Mine | 6,509 ft (1,984 m) | 44.7206°N 118.6000°W | Vinegar Hill | 1150960 |
| Tencent Placer Mine | Mine | 4,902 ft (1,494 m) | 44.8453°N 118.4281°W | Granite | 1127927 |
| Thirty Six Mine | Mine | 190 ft (58 m) | 43.2803°N 124.1969°W | Coos Bay | 1132558 |
| Thomason Mine | Mine | 5,476 ft (1,669 m) | 44.3731°N 118.2231°W | Rastus Mountain | 1151085 |
| Thornburg Placer Mine | Mine | 4,642 ft (1,415 m) | 44.9089°N 118.4711°W | Trout Meadows | 1151136 |
| Threemile Cinder Pit | Mine | 5,804 ft (1,769 m) | 42.6483°N 122.1100°W | Mares Egg Spring | 1134813 |
| Threemile Quarry | Mine | 4,176 ft (1,273 m) | 42.6469°N 122.0778°W | Mares Egg Spring | 1134831 |
| Threemile Rock Quarry | Mine | 4,180 ft (1,270 m) | 42.6467°N 122.0758°W | Mares Egg Spring | 1156286 |
| Tiger Mine | Mine | 7,287 ft (2,221 m) | 44.7231°N 118.5867°W | Vinegar Hill | 1151217 |
| Tillicum Mine | Mine | 5,400 ft (1,600 m) | 44.8569°N 118.3817°W | Granite | 1151227 |
| Tinpan Mine | Mine | 3,127 ft (953 m) | 42.3906°N 123.0958°W | Gold Hill | 1128123 |
| Tip Top Mine | Mine | 3,002 ft (915 m) | 42.1094°N 123.4889°W | Oregon Caves | 1151275 |
| Transvaal Mines | Mine | 7,454 ft (2,272 m) | 45.2514°N 117.1653°W | Joseph | 1151384 |
| Twelve O'Clock Mine | Mine | 1,512 ft (461 m) | 42.5589°N 123.2956°W | Sexton Mountain | 1128330 |
| Umpqua Mine | Mine | 2,014 ft (614 m) | 43.0172°N 122.9328°W | Deadman Mountain | 1151642 |
| Uncle Dan Mine | Mine | 4,108 ft (1,252 m) | 44.7403°N 117.6708°W | Encina | 1128407 |
| Uncle Sam Mine | Mine | 7,103 ft (2,165 m) | 44.8369°N 118.3403°W | Mount Ireland | 1128408 |
| Uncle Sam Mine | Mine | 3,317 ft (1,011 m) | 42.2775°N 123.8417°W | Pearsoll Peak | 1151647 |
| Union Mine (historical) | Mine | 4,455 ft (1,358 m) | 44.8842°N 117.3403°W | Sparta Butte | 1151652 |
| Upper Baisley-Elkhorn Mine | Mine | 6,814 ft (2,077 m) | 44.8567°N 118.0744°W | Elkhorn Peak | 1128433 |
| Valley View Mine | Mine | 5,377 ft (1,639 m) | 44.5089°N 120.4622°W | Stephenson Mountain | 1151718 |
| Van Anda Mine | Mine | 5,755 ft (1,754 m) | 44.7583°N 118.4761°W | Granite | 1151721 |
| Vesuvius Mine | Mine | 4,531 ft (1,381 m) | 43.5814°N 122.6650°W | Fairview Peak | 1134680 |
| Victor Mine | Mine | 1,755 ft (535 m) | 42.6872°N 123.3247°W | Golden | 1128534 |
| Victor Mine | Mine | 2,789 ft (850 m) | 42.5650°N 123.6650°W | Mount Peavine | 1151759 |
| Victory Mine | Mine | 1,575 ft (480 m) | 42.7492°N 123.5331°W | Mount Reuben | 1133742 |
| Virtue Mine | Mine | 3,963 ft (1,208 m) | 44.7636°N 117.6972°W | Virtue Flat | 1128553 |
| War Eagle Mine | Mine | 2,257 ft (688 m) | 42.6219°N 122.9639°W | Boswell Mountain | 1135445 |
| Ward Mine | Mine | 4,491 ft (1,369 m) | 44.3819°N 118.8969°W | John Day | 1151887 |
| Waterman Mine | Mine | 4,245 ft (1,294 m) | 44.4533°N 119.7817°W | Antone | 1151952 |
| Watts Mine | Mine | 1,693 ft (516 m) | 42.2461°N 123.2942°W | Williams | 1151972 |
| Weaver Placer | Mine | 5,545 ft (1,690 m) | 44.7542°N 118.2797°W | Mount Ireland | 1128753 |
| Welch Creek Mine | Mine | 5,436 ft (1,657 m) | 44.8878°N 118.7397°W | Kelsay Butte | 1152000 |
| Western Quartz Mine | Mine | 5,298 ft (1,615 m) | 42.5628°N 118.5525°W | Alvord Hot Springs | 1638433 |
| Western Union Mine | Mine | 7,264 ft (2,214 m) | 44.8625°N 118.1833°W | Bourne | 1128913 |
| Wests Mine | Mine | 2,218 ft (676 m) | 42.3311°N 124.2989°W | Sundown Mountain | 1152159 |
| White King Mine | Mine | 5,915 ft (1,803 m) | 42.3328°N 120.5219°W | Cox Flat | 1152237 |
| White Swan Mine | Mine | 3,842 ft (1,171 m) | 44.7492°N 117.6433°W | Encina | 1129002 |
| Wildhog Mine | Mine | 4,875 ft (1,486 m) | 43.5836°N 122.6608°W | Fairview Peak | 1134677 |
| Windy Gap Mine | Mine | 2,785 ft (849 m) | 42.6950°N 123.6075°W | Mount Reuben | 1129224 |
| Wray Mine | Mine | 5,545 ft (1,690 m) | 44.7000°N 118.6533°W | Boulder Butte | 1152656 |
| Yeager Mine | Mine | 2,096 ft (639 m) | 42.1025°N 123.4714°W | Oregon Caves | 1152703 |
| Yellowhorn Mine | Mine | 1,742 ft (531 m) | 42.6397°N 123.3100°W | Golden | 1129376 |
| Yellowstone Mine | Mine | 5,029 ft (1,533 m) | 44.7569°N 118.4631°W | Granite | 1152727 |
| Yoder Quarry | Mine | 1,125 ft (343 m) | 45.0839°N 122.5383°W | Wilhoit | 1129385 |
| York and Rannels Mine | Mine | 5,692 ft (1,735 m) | 44.1969°N 119.2892°W | Flagtail Mountain | 1152746 |
| Young America Mine | Mine | 4,245 ft (1,294 m) | 44.7947°N 117.9628°W | Wingville | 1129389 |
| Zollman and Wells Mine | Mine | 6,260 ft (1,910 m) | 45.1369°N 117.0594°W | Lick Creek | 1116551 |

== See also ==
- Lists of Oregon-related topics
- Lists of mines in the United States
