= Sterling Creek =

Sterling Creek may refer to:

- Sterling Creek (Georgia), a stream in Georgia
- Sterling Creek (Mohawk River tributary), a stream in New York
- Sterling Creek (Oregon), a stream in Oregon
