= Crawfish Lake =

Crawfish Lake may refer to:

- Crawfish Lake (Washington)
- Crawfish Lake (Grant County, Oregon)
