= Mount Ireland =

Mountain in Grant County, Oregon, U.S.

- Location within Oregon Location within the United States

Highest point
- Elevation: 8,325 ft (2,537 m) NAVD 88
- Prominence: 1,041 ft (317 m)
- Coordinates: 44°50′13″N 118°19′14″W

Geography
- Location: Grant County, Oregon, U.S.
- Parent range: Elkhorn Crest of the southern Blue Mountains
- Topo map: USGS Mount Ireland

Mount Ireland is a mountain in Grant County of the U.S. state of Oregon. It is about 5 miles (8 km) east-northeast of Granite, Oregon. It is the shortest and westernmost 8000'+ peak in the Elkhorn Range of the Blue Mountains at 8,321 feet (2,536 m), and Oregon's 71st highest peak with at least a 500' clean prominence. For a period of several years, this mountain peak was referred to as Bald Mountain, but in 1917 it was changed to Ireland Mountain—in commemoration of the late Henry Ireland, who for 10 years was supervisor of the Whitman National Forest in which the mountain is located—before formally becoming known as Mount Ireland. The name change was brought about by a cooperative effort of local citizens and the US Forest Service to honor Henry Ireland, who had died in 1916.

Several gold mining claims were established in the area and are still identifiable on local forest maps. Some are still patented while others have long been abandoned.

Mount Ireland is located in the Wallowa-Whitman National Forest and outdoor enthusiasts are welcome to hike the Mt. Ireland Lookout Trail #1604 which is open Summer and Fall. Though the trail is ranked as "more difficult", there are no restrictions. The trail covers 3.2 miles from an elevation of 6,000 feet at the trailhead and ends at the Mt. Ireland Fire Lookout. The summit overlooks Baldy Lake on the north slope and though the mountain peak's name was changed, the small mountain lake retained its original name. The view from the summit provides an extensive panorama of the North Fork John Day Wilderness.
