= Sterling Creek (Georgia) =

- Location within Georgia Location within the United States

Physical characteristics
- Source
  - coordinates: 31.9661111°N 81.3425°W
- Mouth
  - coordinates: 31.9177107°N 81.2664978°W

Sterling Creek is a stream in the U.S. state of Georgia. It is a tributary of the Ogeechee River.

Sterling Creek was named after brothers William and Hugh Sterling, pioneer settlers in the 1730s.
