= Flagtail Mountain =

Mountain in Oregon, United States

Coordinates: 44°11′11″N 119°16′53″W

Flagtail Mountain is a summit in Grant County, Oregon, in the United States with an elevation of 6,586 feet (2,007 m) NAVD 88.

== History ==
The first Flagtail Mountain Lookout, a fire lookout tower, was constructed on the mountain in the 1920s. Additional structures were built in 1933 and 1960, and in 2003, it was added to the National Historic Lookout Register.
