= Whetstone Point =

Summit in Oregon

Coordinates: 42°46′53″N 122°32′39″W

Whetstone Point is a summit in the U.S. state of Oregon. The elevation is 5,059 feet (1,542 m).

Whetstone Point was named for the nearby supply of rock from which whetstones were fashioned.
