= Tallowbox Mountain =

Mountain in Oregon, United States

Coordinates: 42°11′47″N 123°09′06″W

Tallowbox Mountain is a summit in Jackson County, Oregon in the United States. The elevation is 4,980 feet (1,520 m).

== History ==
Tallowbox Mountain was named in the 1880s for the pioneers' custom of preserving venison tallow in a tallowbox.

In 1918, the Tallowbox Mountain Lookout was built on the mountain in order to watch for fires. Vandals burned down the lookout in 2007, and it was replaced with a four-way camera.

The Applegate-Siskiyou Alliance, an environmental nonprofit based in Jackson County, opened the 4.2-mile (6.8 km) Tallowbox Trail to the public in 2024.
