= Lookout Mountain (Hood River County, Oregon) =

Mountain in Hood River County, Oregon, United States

- Location within Oregon Location within the United States

Highest point
- Elevation: 6,529 ft (1,990 m) NAVD 88
- Prominence: 1,845 ft (562 m)
- Coordinates: 45°20′33″N 121°31′27″W

Geography
- Location: Mount Hood National Forest; Badger Creek Wilderness; Hood River County
- Parent range: Cascade Range
- Topo map: USGS Badger Lake

Climbing
- Easiest route: Hike

Lookout Mountain, elevation 6,536 feet (1,992 m), is the second highest peak in Oregon's Mount Hood National Forest and the highest point in Badger Creek Wilderness. It sits about 8 miles (13 km) east-southeast of Mount Hood, separated from it by the valley of the East Fork Hood River.

From its summit and with good visibility, one may see (from approximately west and moving clockwise) Mount Hood, Mount St. Helens, Mount Rainier, Mount Adams, Broken Top, South Sister, North Sister, Mount Washington, and Mount Jefferson with the unassisted eye.

In 1911 a United States Forest Service lookout was built on the summit. It was replaced by an L-4 tower in 1940. The site was abandoned in 1966 and the structure was later removed.
