= Mount Isabelle =

Mountain in Oregon, United States

Coordinates: 42.3031945°N 123.1047684°W

Mount Isabelle is a summit in the U.S. state of Oregon. The elevation is 4,498 feet (1,371 m).

Mount Isabelle was named after one Isabelle Smith.
