= Crawfish Lake (Grant County, Oregon) =

Lake in Oregon, United States

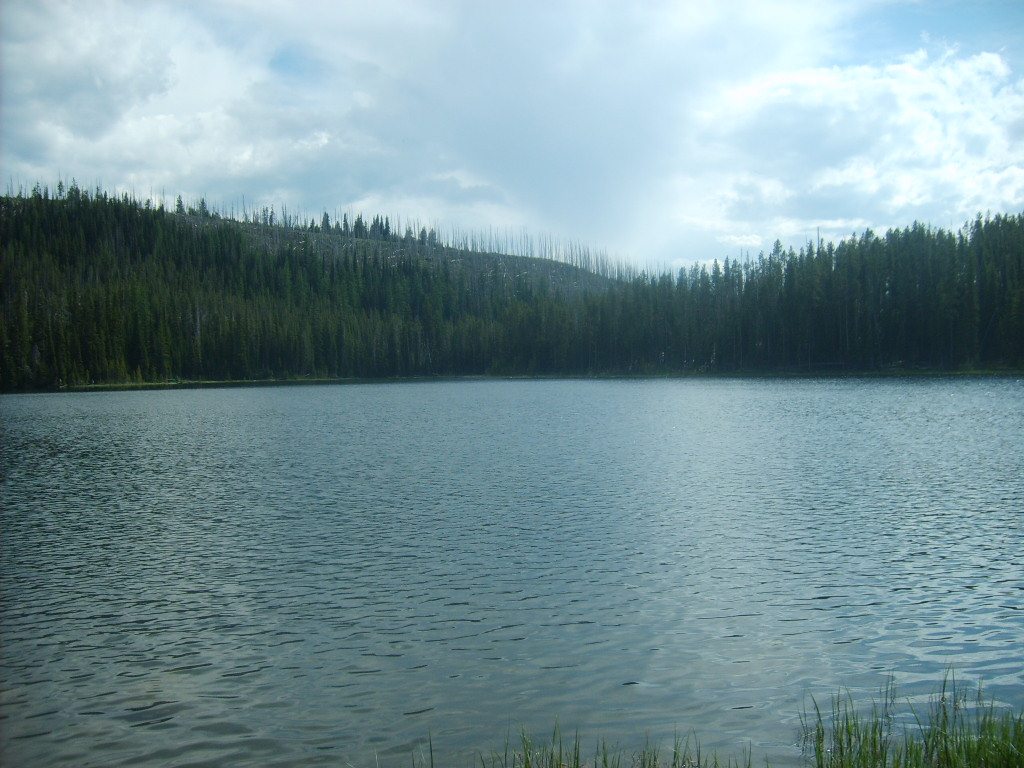
- Crawfish Lake on July 3, 2009

- Location of Crawfish Lake in Oregon, USA. Crawfish Lake (the United States)
- Location: Elkhorn Mountain Range, Grant County, Oregon, U.S.
- Coordinates: 44.9360°N 118.2647°W
- Type: Tarn
- Basin countries: United States
- Max. length: 441 yd (403 m)
- Max. width: 255 yd (233 m)
- Surface elevation: 6,896 ft (2,102 m)

Crawfish Lake is a glacial lake located in the Elkhorn Mountain Range in the Blue Mountains of Northeastern Oregon. It is situated between the cities of North Powder and Granite, about 1.5 aerial miles south west of Hoffer Lakes. It is not accessible by any kind of motor vehicle. However, there is a popular hiking trail that leads to the lake.

== Trail ==
Crawfish Lake can be accessed by the Crawfish Lake Trail #1606. The Crawfish Lake Trailhead is located on Forest Road 73 (Elkhorn Scenic Byway) a few miles past Anthony Lake. The lake is 1.5 miles from the trailhead. The trail descends to the lake, crossing a stream several times. Most stream crossings have some form of a bridge, though several do not. The Crawfish Lake Trail leads another 1.5 miles past Crawfish lake where it leads to the Upper Crawfish Lake Trailhead at end of Forest Road 7300-216. The U.S. Forrest Service rated the trail moderate to more difficult.
