= Sterling Creek (Oregon) =

- Location within Oregon Location within the United States

Physical characteristics
- Source
  - coordinates: 42.2372222°N 122.92°W
- Mouth
  - coordinates: 42.1723481°N 122.9997639°W

Sterling Creek is a stream in the U.S. state of Oregon. It is a tributary to the Applegate River.

Sterling Creek was named in the 1850s after one James Sterling.
