= Jean Baptiste Charbonneau =

American explorer, guide, fur trapper, and military scout (1805–1866)

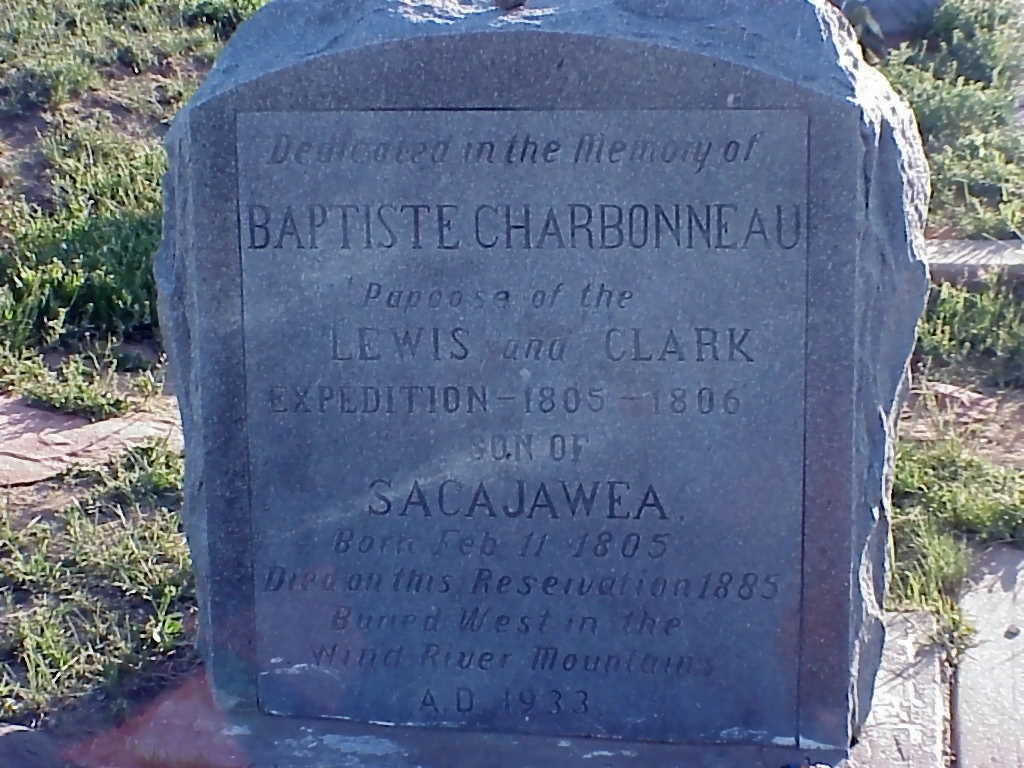
- Memorial to Charbonneau at Fort Washakie
- Born: February 11, 1805; Fort Mandan, present-day Washburn, North Dakota, U.S.
- Died: May 16, 1866 (aged 61); Danner, Oregon, U.S.
- Resting place: Jordan Valley Hamlet Cemetery, Danner, Oregon, U.S. 42.982647°N 117.0547225°W
- Other names: Jean, Pompey ("Pomp" or "Little Pomp")
- Known for: Accompanied the Lewis and Clark Expedition as an infant
- Parents: Toussaint Charbonneau (father); Sacagawea (mother)

Jean Baptiste Charbonneau (February 11, 1805 – May 16, 1866), sometimes known in childhood as Pompey or Little Pomp, was an American explorer, guide, fur trapper, trader, military scout during the Mexican–American War, alcalde (mayor) of Mission San Luis Rey de Francia and a gold digger and hotel operator in Northern California. His mother was Sacagawea, a Lemhi Shoshone who worked as a guide and interpreter for the Lewis and Clark Expedition. Jean Baptiste's father was also a member of the Lewis and Clark expedition, a French Canadian explorer and trader named Toussaint Charbonneau.

Jean Baptiste was born at Fort Mandan in North Dakota. In his early childhood, he accompanied his parents as they traveled across the country with the Lewis and Clark expedition, the first group to cross the U.S. to the Pacific coast. The expedition co-leader William Clark nicknamed the boy Pompey ("Pomp" or "Little Pomp"). After the death of his mother, he lived with Clark in St. Louis, Missouri, where he attended St. Louis Academy. Clark paid for his education.

Sacagawea and Toussaint Charbonneau also had a second child, a daughter named Lizette Charbonneau; however, because she receives only occasional mention in Clark's papers, her life remains unclear beyond her third birthday.

Jean Baptiste and Sacagawea appear on the United States Sacagawea dollar coin. He is the second child depicted on United States currency. Pompeys Pillar on the Yellowstone River in Montana and the community of Charbonneau, Oregon are named for him.

== Childhood ==
=== Lewis and Clark Expedition ===
Jean Baptiste Charbonneau was born to Sacagawea, a Shoshone, and her husband, the French Canadian trapper Toussaint Charbonneau, in early 1805 at Fort Mandan in North Dakota. This was during the Lewis and Clark Expedition, which wintered there in 1804–05. The senior Charbonneau had been hired by the expedition as an interpreter and, learning that his pregnant wife was Shoshone, the captains, Meriwether Lewis and William Clark, agreed to bring her along. They knew they would need to negotiate with the Shoshone for horses at the headwaters of the Missouri River. Meriwether Lewis noted the boy's birth in his journal:

The party that were ordered last evening set out early this morning. the weather was fair and could wind N. W. about five o'clock this evening one of the wives of Charbono was delivered of a fine boy. It is worthy of remark that this was the first child which this woman had boarn and as is common in such cases her labour was tedious and the pain violent; Mr. Jessome informed me that he had freequently administered a small portion of the rattle of the rattle-snake, which he assured me had never failed to produce the desired effect, that of hastening the birth of the child; having the rattle of a snake by me I gave it to him and he administered two rings of it to the woman broken in small pieces with the fingers and added to a small quantity of water. Whether this medicine was truly the cause or not I shall not undertake to determine, but I was informed that she had not taken it more than ten minutes before she brought forth perhaps this remedy may be worthy of future experiments, but I must confess that I want faith as to it's efficacy.

The infant traveled from North Dakota to the Pacific Ocean and back, carried along in the expedition's boats or upon his mother's back. His presence is often credited by historians with assuring native tribes of the expedition's peaceful intentions, as they believed that no war party would travel with a woman and child.

=== After the expedition ===
In April 1807, about a year after the end of the expedition, the Charbonneau family moved to St. Louis, at Clark's invitation. Toussaint Charbonneau and Sacagawea departed for the Mandan villages in April 1809 and left the boy to live with Clark. In November 1809, the parents returned to St. Louis to try farming, but left again in April 1811. Jean Baptiste continued to reside with Clark.

Clark's two-story home, built in 1818, contained an illuminated museum 100 feet (30 m) long by 30 feet (9.1 m) wide. Its walls were decorated with national flags and life-size portraits of George Washington and the Marquis de Lafayette, Native artifacts, and mounted animal heads. Upon visiting the museum, Henry Schoolcraft, a geologist and ethnographer, wrote:

Clark evinces a philosophical taste in the preservation of many subjects of natural history. We believe this is the only collection of specimens of art and nature west of Cincinnati, which partakes of the character of a museum, or cabinet of natural history.

As a boy, Charbonneau learned from the vast collection.

Clark paid for Charbonneau's education at St. Louis Academy, a Jesuit Catholic school (now called St. Louis University High School), although the expense was considerable for the time. The school's single classroom was then located in the storehouse of Clark's friend, the trader Joseph Robidoux. Brothers James and George Kennerly paid for Charbonneau's supplies for 1820 and were reimbursed by Clark. (Note: January 22, 1820: payment to J. E. Welch for the two-quarters tuition of J. B. Charbonneau, a half-Native American boy, and firewood and ink. Amount = $16.37; April 1, 1820: to J. & G. H. Kennerly for one Roman History for Charbonneau, a half Native, $1.50; one pair of shoes, $2.24; two pairs of socks, $1.50; two squires of paper and quills, $1.50; 1 [William] Scott's Lesson, $1.50; 1 dictionary, $1.50; 1 hat, $4.00; four yards of cloth, $10.00; one ciphering book, $1., one slate and pencils, $.62.; April 11, 1820: to J. E. Welch for one quarter's tuition, including fuel and ink. Amount = $8.37.; June 30, 1820: to Louis Tesson Honoré for the board, lodging and washing. Amount = $45.00.; October 1, 1820: to L. T. Honoré for lodging, boarding, and washing from 1 July to 30 September at $15.00 per month. Amount = $45.00; March 31, 1822: to Louis Tesson Honore for boarding, lodging and washing of J. B. Charbonneau, a half native.)

From June through September 1820 and in 1822, Jean Baptiste boarded with Louis Tesson Honoré, a Clark family friend and member of his church, Christ Episcopal. The general had helped organize the church in 1819. They lived in St. Ferdinand Township in St. Louis County, Missouri near Charbonneau's father's 320 acres (1.3 km^{2}) of land.

== Adult life ==
On June 21, 1823, at age eighteen, Charbonneau met Duke Paul Wilhelm of Württemberg, the nephew of Frederick I of Württemberg. Charbonneau was working at a Kaw trading post on the Kansas River near present-day Kansas City, Kansas. Wilhelm was traveling in America on a natural history expedition to the northern plains with Jean Baptiste's father as his guide. On October 9, 1823, he invited the younger Charbonneau to return to Europe with him, which was agreed upon.

The two set sail on the Smyrna from St. Louis in December 1823. Jean Baptiste lived at the duke's palace in Württemberg for nearly six years, where he learned German and Spanish and improved his English and French. The latter was still the dominant language of St. Louis, which had first enabled his conversations with the Duke. According to a 1932 translation of Wilhelm's journal by the historian Louis C. Butscher, Wilhelm wrote that Charbonneau was "...a companion on all my travels over Europe and northern Africa until 1829." In 2001, Albert Furtwangler, PhD, questioned the accuracy of Butscher's German translation, noting two more recent translations of the duke's journals, and suggests that Charbonneau's role in Wilhelm's court may have been less intimate than Butscher's perhaps romanticized account implied. Charbonneau may have been hired as a servant, rather than invited as a companion. As support, he notes the apparent lack of further contact between the two men after Charbonneau's return to America. However, lack of contact in itself does not mean Charbonneau was a hired hand. Such an act may have been an insult to Clark, which the duke likely would have avoided. As with many aspects of his life, little is known for certain about Charbonneau's time in Europe.

== Children ==
Parish records in Württemberg show that while there, Charbonneau fathered a child with Anastasia Katharina Fries, a soldier's daughter. The baby, Anton Fries, died about three months after his birth.

Nearly two decades later, while in California as an alcalde or magistrate, Charbonneau was recorded as being the father of another child. On May 4, 1848, Maria Catarina Charguana was born to her mother Margarita Sobin, a Luiseño woman, and Charbonneau. Sobin, 23 at the time, traveled to Mission San Fernando Rey de España near Los Angeles for the infant girl's baptism, performed on May 28, 1848, and recorded by Father Blas Ordaz as entry #1884. Margarita Sobin later married Gregory Trujillo, and some of their descendants may be members of the La Jolla Band of Luiseño Indians.

== Trapper and hunter ==
7th Baronet of Blair, 1837, by Alfred Jacob Miller

In November 1829, Charbonneau returned to St. Louis, where he was hired by Joseph Robidoux as a fur trapper for the American Fur Company, to work in Idaho and Utah. He attended the 1832 Pierre's Hole rendezvous while working for the Rocky Mountain Fur Company. There he fought in the bloodiest non-military conflict that preceded the Plains Indian wars, which began in 1854.

From 1833–1840 Charbonneau worked in the fur trade in the Rocky Mountain Trapping System with other mountain men, such as Jim Bridger, James Beckwourth and Joe Meek.

From 1840–42 he worked from Fort Saint Vrain, floating bison hides and tongues 2,000 miles (3,200 km) down the South Platte River to St. Louis. On one of the voyages, he camped with Captain John C. Frémont on his cartographic expedition. In 1843, he guided Sir William Drummond Stewart, a Scottish baronet, on his second long trip to the American West, which was a lavish hunting expedition.

Seeking employment again, in 1844 Charbonneau went to Bent's Fort in Colorado, where he was a chief hunter, and worked also as a trader with southern Plains Indians. William Boggs, a traveler who met him, wrote that Charbonneau "...wore his hair long, [and] was...very high strung..." He reported, "...it was said Charbonneau (sic) was the best man on foot on the plains or in the Rocky Mountains."

== Mexican–American War ==
In October 1846, Charbonneau, Antoine Leroux and Pauline Weaver were hired as scouts by General Stephen W. Kearny. Charbonneau's experience with military marches, such as with James William Abert in August 1845, along the Canadian River, and his fluency in Native languages qualified him for the position. Kearny directed him to join Colonel Philip St. George Cooke on an arduous march from Santa Fe, New Mexico, to San Diego, California, a distance of 1,100 miles (1,800 km). Their mission was to build the first wagon road to Southern California and to guide some 20 huge Murphy supply wagons to the west coast for the military during the Mexican–American War.

A contingent of soldiers made up of some 339 Mormon men and six Mormon women, known as the Mormon Battalion, were the builders of that new road over the uncharted southwest from Santa Fe to San Diego and Los Angeles. A memorial to the historic trek of the Mormon Battalion and their guide Charbonneau has been erected at the San Pedro River, one mile (1.6 km) north of the U.S.–Mexico border near the present-day town of Palominas, Arizona. Other monuments or historic markers are in Tucson, Arizona and in California at Box Canyon near Warner Springs, at Temecula, at Old Town San Diego and at Fort Moore in Los Angeles. Colonel Cooke's diary mentions Charbonneau some 29 times from November 16, 1846, to January 21, 1847. Eight of the twenty wagons reached Mission San Luis Rey de Francia, four miles (6.4 km) from today's Oceanside, California, and the leaders counted the expedition as a success.

Cooke wrote of the Mormon Battalion, "History may be searched in vain for an equal march of infantry." Known as Cooke's Road or the Gila Trail but more currently known as the Mormon Battalion Trail, the wagon road was used by settlers, miners, stagecoaches of the Butterfield Stage line and cattlemen driving longhorns to feed the gold camps. Parts of the route became the Southern Pacific Railroad and U.S. Route 66. Currently, the Boy Scouts of America gives an award for those who hike sections of this historic trail. In February 1848, knowledge gained about the region was used as the basis of the Treaty of Guadalupe Hidalgo, which established the United States-Mexico border in December 1853, following the Mexican-American War.

== Alcalde ==
In November 1847, Charbonneau accepted an appointment from Colonel John D. Stevenson as alcalde (mayor) at Mission San Luis Rey de Francia. This position made him the only civilian authority, a combined sheriff, lawyer and magistrate, in a post-war region covering about 225 square miles (580 km^{2}). From 1834–50, the lands were owned by rancheros through legally questionable land grants.

The rancheros hired local Luiseño people to do agricultural work. Many functioned in virtual servitude, and some rancheros paid them only with liquor. Trying to correct abuses and also facilitate post-war control, in November 1847, Colonel Richard Barnes Mason, the territorial governor, ordered Charbonneau to force the sale of a large ranch owned by the powerful Jose Antonio Pico, whose family was politically connected. His brother Pio Pico had been the last governor of California under Mexico. On January 1, 1848, Mason banned the sale of liquor to Native Americans. Such ordinances attacked the foundation of ranchero power and ability to do business. Eventually, the changes led to United States civilian control of California. Although Charbonneau was assisted by Captain J. D. Hunter as he negotiated with Pico, he saw that local resistance would make enforcing Mason's orders difficult. Charbonneau resigned his post in August 1848 and was soon followed by Hunter. California statehood on September 9, 1850, ended the post-war difficulties.

== Gold mining ==
In September 1848, Charbonneau arrived in Placer County, California at the American River, near what is now Auburn. Arriving early in what became known as the California Gold Rush, he joined only a handful of prospectors. Panning was not done during the hard Sierra Nevada winter or spring runoff, so in June 1849, he joined Jim Beckwourth and two others at a camp on Buckner's Bar to mine the river at the Big Crevice. This claim "...was shallow and paid well". Charbonneau lived at a site known as Secret Ravine, one of 12 ravines around Auburn. A successful miner, he kept working in the area for nearly sixteen years.

A measure of his success was that Charbonneau could afford the mining region's highly inflated cost of living. For example, at a time when a good wage in the West was $30 per month, it cost $8–16 per day to live in Auburn. Transiency was high but Charbonneau was still there in 1860, working as the hotel manager at the Orleans Hotel in Auburn. By 1858, many miners had left the California fields for other gold rushes. In April 1866, he departed for other opportunities at age 61. He may have headed for Montana to prospect for gold, although sites such as at Silver City and DeLamar in Idaho Territory were much closer.

== Final journey and death ==
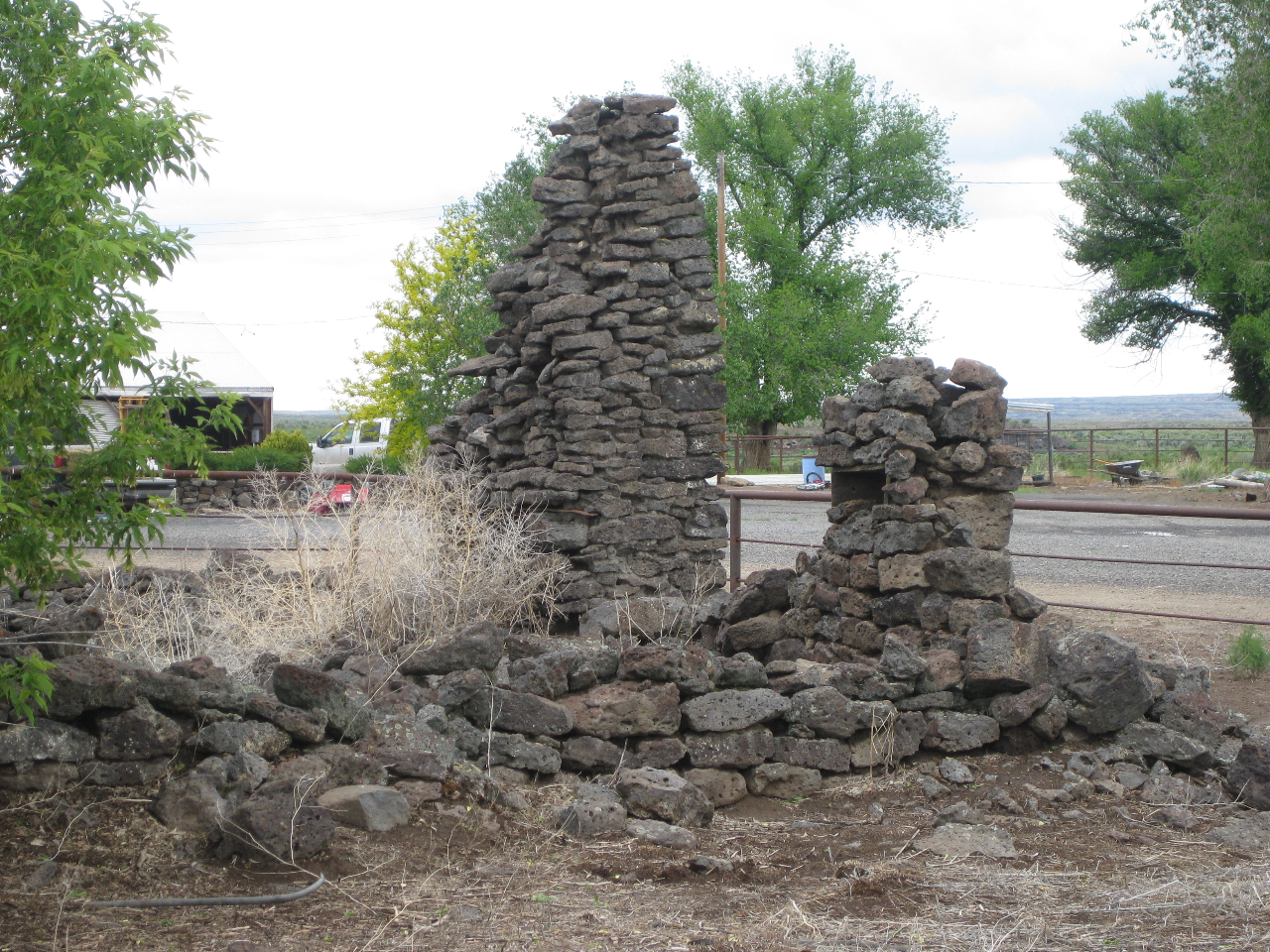
Inskip ruins

It is not clear exactly why Charbonneau left Auburn, but the recessionary local economy was certainly a motivation. Before leaving he visited the Placer Herald newspaper and visited with an editor, who wrote later in his obituary, "...he was about [his purpose was] returning to familiar scenes". Some of those "familiar scenes" may have been where he had lived and worked as a mountain man east of the Great Basin. His destination also may have been the Owyhee Mountains, where rich placer deposits were discovered in May 1863. Or perhaps he sought to reach Alder Gulch near Virginia City, Montana, because it had produced $31 million in gold by late 1865. Other possible destinations were the Bannock, Montana gold strikes or—as noted above—the mines at Silver City (formerly Ruby City), Delamar or Boonville.

His route and travel method likely took him on a stagecoach over Donner Summit and east along the well-traveled Humboldt River Trail to Winnemucca, Nevada, then north to the U.S. Army's Camp McDermitt at the Oregon border. Passing the camp in rugged terrain, the men reached an Owyhee River crossing at present-day Rome, Oregon, where an apparent accident occurred and Charbonneau went into the river. The accident's cause is unknown, but there are several possibilities. He may have been on a stagecoach operated by the Boise-Silver City-Winnemucca stage company that began its route in 1866 out of Camp McDermitt and in crossing the river, the coach sank. Or he may have been on horseback and fallen off the river bank or slipped out of the saddle while crossing. The Owyhee River in snow melt may have turned into whitewater. Other possibilities are he was injured on the land journey, inhaled alkali dust, or fell ill from drinking contaminated water.

The ill Charbonneau was taken to Inskip Station in Danner, Oregon, built in 1865, about 33 miles (53 km) from the river and west of Jordan Valley. It is now a ghost town. The former stagecoach waystation, mail stop, and general store served travelers to Oregon and the California gold fields. It had its own well, and Charbonneau may have deteriorated from drinking the water. After his death there, his body was taken approximately one-quarter mile (0.40 km) north and buried.

Charbonneau died at age 61 on May 16, 1866. A death notice was sent by an unknown writer, likely one of two fellow travelers on the journey east, to the Owyhee Avalanche newspaper and it said he died of pneumonia. This is the first documented evidence of his death. The Placer Herald obituary writer opined that he succumbed to the infamous "Mountain Fever", to which many illnesses in the West were attributed.

=== Gravesite memorial ===
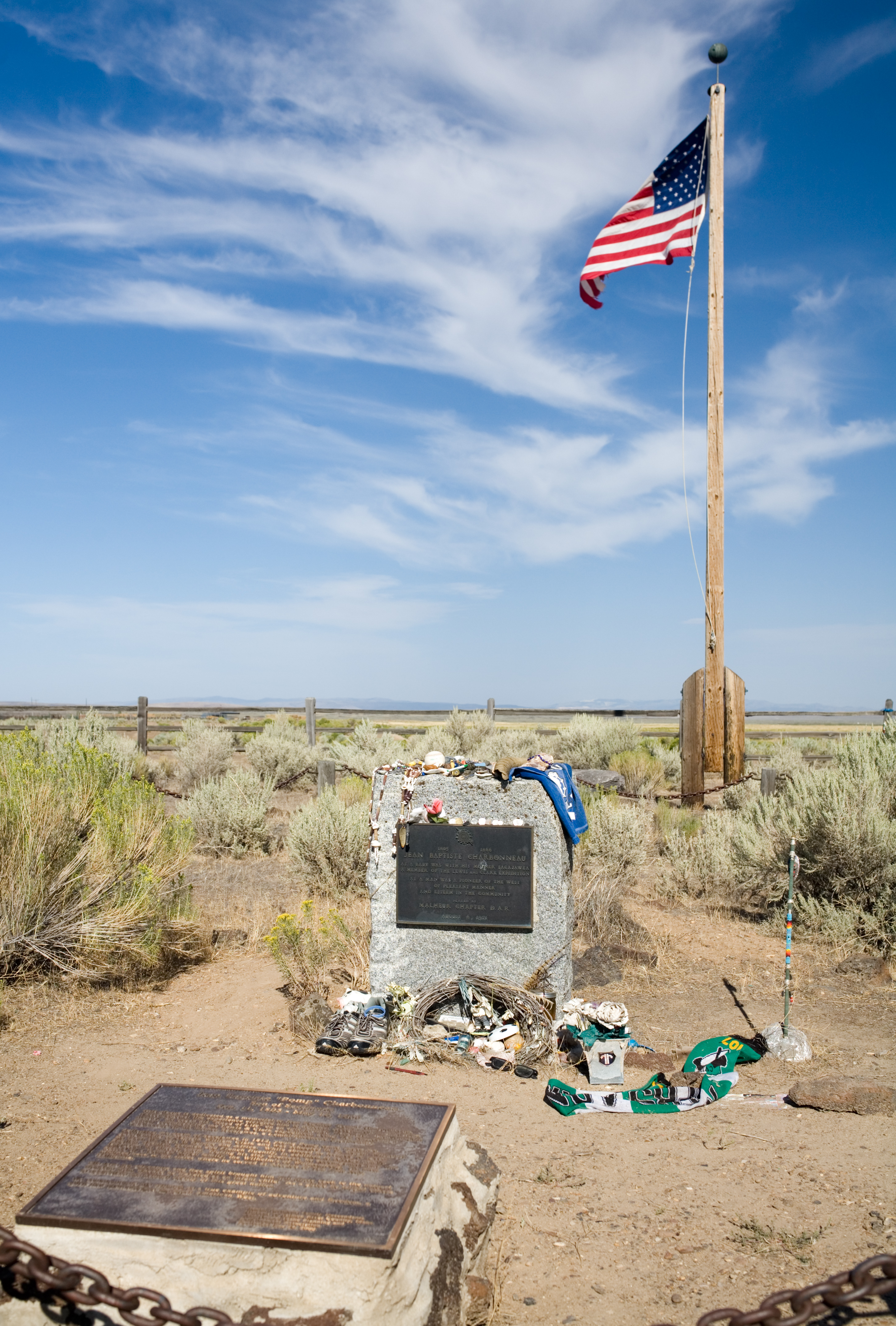
The First & Third Markers

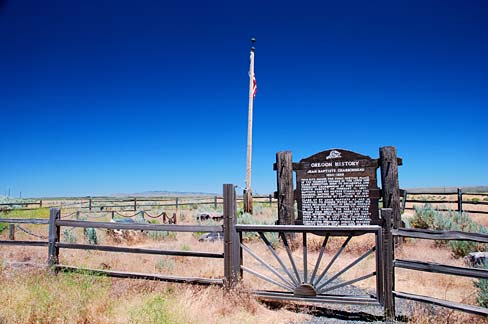
The Second Marker

Charbonneau's gravesite, listed on the National Register of Historic Places in 1973, sits on one acre (4,000 m^{2}) of land within sight of the Inskip Station ruins. (The site is also within half a mile of Danner's abandoned Anderson General Store, which is still intact.) Located amidst the 6,000-acre (24 km^{2}) Ruby Ranch grounds, the encircled memorial area was donated to Malheur County by the landowners for historic preservation, and features three historical markers within walking distance:

- In 1971, the Malheur County Daughters of the American Revolution placed a standing stone marker.
- In 1973, the Oregon Historical Society erected a second standing marker made of wood, which reads:

OREGON HISTORY
Jean Baptiste Charbonneau
1805–1866
This site marks the final resting place of the youngest member of the Lewis and Clark Expedition. Born to Sacagawea and Toussaint Charbonneau at Fort Mandan (North Dakota), on February 11, 1805, Baptiste and his mother symbolized the peaceful nature of the "Corps of Discovery". Educated by Captain William Clark at St. Louis, Baptiste at 18 traveled to Europe where he spent six years becoming fluent in English, German, French, and Spanish. Returning to America in 1829, he ranged the Far West for nearly four decades as a mountain man guide, interpreter, magistrate, and Forty-Niner. In 1866, he left the California gold fields for a new strike in Montana, contracted pneumonia en route, reached "Inskips Ranche", here, and died on May 16, 1866.

- In 2000, a third marker was dedicated in bronze by an Idaho-based group which included descendants of the Lemhi Shoshone tribe. As the son of Sacagawea, a Northern Shoshone who lived in the Lemhi Valley, Charbonneau is considered one of their people.

Also known as the Jordan Valley Hamlet Cemetery, the interment site itself is additionally host to five other graves from the late 1880s. A plaque laid nearby at Inskip Station lists their names beside that of "J.B. Charbonneau", along with the inscription:

"Under the wide and starry sky..."

=== Disputed timelines ===
Earlier in the twentieth century, Dr Grace Raymond Hebard of the University of Wyoming, a political economist, not a historian or anthropologist, argued that Charbonneau died and was buried at the Shoshone Wind River Indian Reservation in Wyoming. Dr. Charles Eastman, a Santee Sioux and not of the Shoshone language group, did research that attempted to establish that Charbonneau's mother Sacagawea died at the reservation on April 9, 1884. Some believe that Charbonneau died in 1885 and was buried next to her. Memorials in their names were erected in 1933 at nearby Fort Washakie. Eastman did his research in 1924–25, interpreting oral history. But his translation has been superseded by documentary evidence for both Charbonneau and Sacagawea.

In 1964, an edited nineteenth-century journal was published stating that Sacagawea died much earlier, on December 20, 1812, of a "putrid fever" (possible following childbirth) at Fort Lisa on the Missouri River. Four 19th-century documents support this earlier date, including a statement by William Clark years after the 1805–07 Lewis and Clark expedition that "Sacajawea was dead."

== Legacy and honors ==
- Charbonneau's image appears alongside his mother's on the Sacagawea dollar. He was the second infant to be depicted on U.S. currency, after Virginia Dare on the 1937 Roanoke half-dollar. The portrait design is unusual, as the copyrights have been assigned to and are owned by the United States Mint. Therefore the portrait is not in the public domain, as most U.S. coin designs are.
- Pompeys Pillar on the Yellowstone River in Montana and the community of Charbonneau, Oregon are named after him.
- Pomp Peak in Montana's Bridger Range is named after him. The peak is next to Sacagawea Peak.
- A memorial plaque was established in his honor under the cedar tree near the Old Fire House in Old Town, Auburn, California.

== See also ==
- Santa Ysabel Asistencia
- Jerry Potts
- Museum of Human Beings
