= Cow Creek (Jordan Creek tributary) =

- Location of the mouth of Cow Creek in Oregon Cow Creek (Jordan Creek tributary) (the United States)

Location
- Country: United States
- State: Idaho
- County: Owyhee County, Idaho and Malheur County, Oregon

Physical characteristics
- Source
  - location: near De Lamar, Owyhee County, Idaho
  - coordinates: 43°04′23″N 116°50′23″W
  - elevation: 7,048 ft (2,148 m)
- Mouth: Jordan Creek
  - location: Danner, Malheur County, Oregon
  - coordinates: 42°56′51″N 117°20′38″W
  - elevation: 4,216 ft (1,285 m)
- Length: 51 mi (82 km)
- Basin size: 330 sq mi (850 km^{2})
- Discharge
  - minimum: 1 cu ft/s (0.028 m^{3}/s)

Cow Creek is a 51-mile (82 km) tributary of Jordan Creek in the U.S. state of Oregon. The source of Cow Creek is at an elevation of 7,048 feet (2,148 m) near De Lamar, Idaho, while the mouth is at an elevation of 4,216 feet (1,285 m) at Danner. Cow Creek has a 330-square-mile (850 km^{2}) watershed.

== See also ==
- List of rivers of Oregon
- List of longest streams of Oregon
- List of rivers of Idaho
- List of longest streams of Idaho
