= Middle Fork Owyhee River =

- Location of the mouth of the Middle Fork Owyhee River in Oregon Middle Fork Owyhee River (the United States)
- Etymology: An early name for Hawaii.

Location
- Country: United States
- State: Oregon, Idaho
- County: Malheur County, Oregon, Owyhee County, Idaho

Physical characteristics
- Source: Juniper Mountain
  - location: Idaho
  - coordinates: 42°26′40″N 116°52′40″W
  - elevation: 6,797 ft (2,072 m)
- Mouth: Owyhee River
  - location: Three Forks, Oregon
  - coordinates: 42°32′37″N 117°09′40″W
  - elevation: 3,963 ft (1,208 m)

The Middle Fork Owyhee River is a tributary of the North Fork Owyhee River in Malheur County, Oregon, and Owyhee County, Idaho, in the United States. It forms along Juniper Mountain, south of the Owyhee Mountains in Idaho. From its headwaters, it flows southwest then curves northwest to and beyond the Idaho–Oregon border, then turns north to meet the North Fork at Three Forks, Oregon. The confluence is less than a mile upstream from the North Fork's confluence with the Owyhee River. Below Three Forks, the main stem Owyhee flows 161 miles (259 km) to empty into the Snake River.

Named tributaries of the Middle Fork from source to mouth include Berry Gulch, Summit Springs Creek, and Field Creek, all of which enter from the left. Below that Pole Creek enters from the right.

== See also ==
- List of rivers of Idaho
- List of rivers of Oregon
