= North Fork Owyhee River =

- Location of the mouth of the North Fork Owyhee River in Oregon North Fork Owyhee River (the United States)
- Etymology: An early name for Hawaii.

Location
- Country: United States
- State: Oregon, Idaho
- County: Malheur County, Oregon, Owyhee County, Idaho

Physical characteristics
- Source: Owyhee Mountains
  - location: near Indian Meadows, Idaho
  - coordinates: 42°40′59″N 116°47′25″W
  - elevation: 6,685 ft (2,038 m)
- Mouth: Owyhee River
  - location: Three Forks, Oregon
  - coordinates: 42°32′39″N 117°10′10″W
  - elevation: 3,953 ft (1,205 m)
- Length: 30.4 mi (48.9 km)

National Wild and Scenic River
- Type: Wild, Recreational
- Designated: October 28, 1988

The North Fork Owyhee River is a tributary, about 30 miles (48 km) long, of the Owyhee River in Malheur County, Oregon, and Owyhee County, Idaho, in the United States. It begins on the east flank of the Owyhee Mountains in Idaho and flows generally southwest to meet the main stem at Three Forks, Oregon, 161 miles (259 km) above the confluence of the larger river with the Snake River.

Named tributaries of the North Fork, from source to mouth, include Noon Creek, which enters from the right; Pleasant Valley Creek, left; and Juniper Creek, right, all on the Idaho side of the border. Further downstream on the Oregon side, Squaw Creek enters from the left, Cherry Creek from the right, and the Middle Fork Owyhee River from the left before the North Fork meets the main stem at Three Forks.

== Wild and scenic designation ==
The upper 20.8 miles (33.5 km) of the North Fork, from the upstream boundary of the North Fork Owyhee Wilderness to the Idaho–Oregon border, are part of the National Wild and Scenic Rivers System. Of this total, 15.1 miles (24.3 km) are classified as wild and the remaining 5.7 miles (9.2 km) are recreational. The lower 9.6 miles (15.4 km) of the North Fork, from the Idaho–Oregon border to the main stem, is also classified as wild. It flows through a deep canyon rimmed with basalt. The Bureau of Land Management oversees the land along the river in both states.

== Camping ==
The BLM operates North Fork Campground, about 27 miles (43 km) southeast of Jordan Valley, Oregon. Amenities include seven primitive campsites, picnic tables, fire grates, and a vault toilet but no drinking water.

== Wilderness ==
In 2009, the United States Congress designated the wilderness, which covers about 43,000 acres (17,000 ha) in the Idaho portion of the North Fork watershed. It extends from the headwaters in Idaho almost to the border with Oregon. Managed by the BLM, it includes river canyons that are more than 1,000 feet (300 m) deep as well as large expanses of plateau. The wilderness is home to sage grouse, pronghorn, bighorn sheep, rare plants, and many other species. The wilderness is about 80 miles (130 km) southwest of Boise.

== See also ==
- List of rivers of Idaho
- List of rivers of Oregon
