= Antelope Reservoir =

Body of water in Oregon, United States

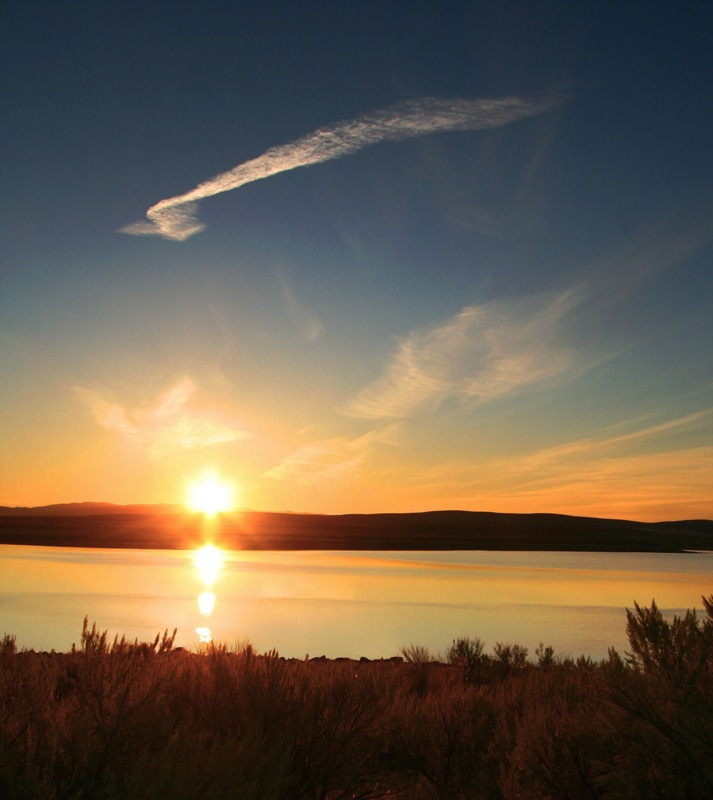
- Morning at Antelope Reservoir

- Location of Antelope Reservoir in Oregon, USA. Antelope Reservoir (the United States)
- Location: Malheur County, Oregon
- Coordinates: 42°54′24″N 117°14′09″W
- Type: reservoir, eutrophic
- Primary inflows: Jack Creek, Antelope Feeder Canal from Jordan Creek, intermittent streams
- Primary outflows: Jack Creek
- Catchment area: 638 square miles (1,650 km^{2})
- Basin countries: United States
- Built: 1913–1914
- Surface area: 3,285 acres (1,329 ha)
- Average depth: 8 feet (2.4 m)
- Max. depth: 25 feet (7.6 m)
- Water volume: 26,300 acre-feet (32.4×10^{6} m^{3})
- Shore length^{1}: 17 miles (27 km)
- Surface elevation: 4,318 feet (1,316 m)
- Settlements: Jordan Valley
- ^{1} Shore length is not a well-defined measure.

Antelope Reservoir is a large body of water impounded for irrigation in a semi-arid region of southeastern Oregon in the United States. Located near the small city of Jordan Valley in Malheur County, it is about 10 miles (16 km) west of Oregon's border with Idaho. Although the lake is formed by a dam across Jack Creek, most of the water enters the reservoir via the Antelope Feeder Canal. It diverts water to the reservoir from nearby Jordan Creek at a point near the Idaho border. Jack Creek, which carries minor outflows from the reservoir, empties into Jordan Creek further downstream.

== History ==
The lake was originally formed by a 42-foot (13 m) high dam, built in 1913–14, on Jack Creek. At that time, the water in the reservoir came from intermittent surface streams. The dam, managed by the Jordan Valley Irrigation District, was raised to 80 feet (24 m) in 1933, and in addition to the intermittent flows the higher dam impounds water from Jordan Creek. The water is used to irrigate about 12,000 acres (4,900 ha) of farmland downstream of the lake.

== Recreation ==
The Bureau of Land Management, which administers much of the grazing land in the Antelope Reservoir basin, maintains a public campground and boat ramp at the lake. Anglers can fish for stocked trout, and wild Columbia River redband trout from Jordan Creek sometimes enter the reservoir. However, the Oregon Health Authority has issued warnings about very high levels of methylmercury contamination that makes fish caught from the lake dangerous to eat. The contamination stems from past mining activity along the headwaters of Jordan Creek, near Silver City, Idaho, where large quantities of mercury were used to separate gold and silver from other materials.

Fishing in Oregon says the lake "is a better destination for solitude than for fishing." Other activities include waterfowl watching, "gorgeous sunsets and terrific star-gazing opportunities."

== See also ==
- List of lakes in Oregon
