= Owyhee Dam =

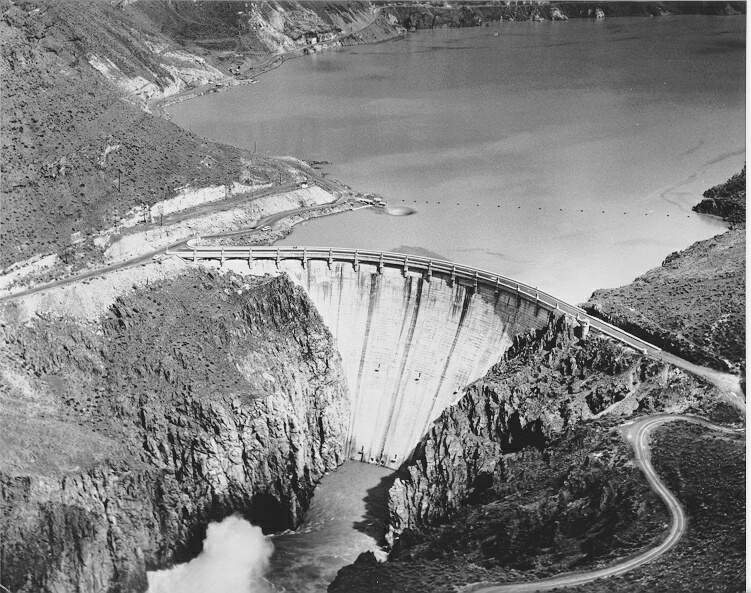
- View from the north
- Interactive map of Owyhee Dam
- Location: Malheur County, Oregon
- Coordinates: 43°38′31″N 117°14′33″W
- Construction began: 1928
- Opening date: 1932
- Construction cost: $6 million
- Operator: Owyhee Irrigation District (Operator)

Dam and spillways
- Impounds: Owyhee River
- Height: 417 feet (127 m)
- Length: 833 feet (254 m)
- Width (crest): 30 feet (9.1 m)
- Width (base): 265 feet (81 m)

Reservoir
- Creates: Owyhee Reservoir
- Total capacity: 1.1833 million acre⋅ft (1.46 billion m^{3})

Owyhee Dam (National ID # OR00582) is a concrete arch–gravity dam on the Owyhee River in Eastern Oregon near Adrian, Oregon, United States. Completed in 1932 during the Great Depression, the dam generates electricity and provides irrigation water for several irrigation districts in Oregon and neighboring Idaho. At the time of completion, it was the tallest dam of its type in the world, surpassed about two years later by the Lac du Chambon dam in France. The dam is part of the Owyhee Dam Historic District, which is listed on the National Register of Historic Places.

The dam impounds the river to create the Owyhee Reservoir, with storage capacity of nearly 1.2 million acre⋅ft (1.48 billion m^{3}) of water. The more than 400-foot-tall (120 m) concrete arch–gravity dam is owned by the United States Bureau of Reclamation (USBR) and operated by the Owyhee Irrigation District. Haystack Rock Road is carried over the 833-foot-long (254 m) crest of the dam.

== History ==
In August 1927, the United States Congress authorized the building of a dam in the canyon of the Owyhee River. Construction of the dam began in 1928 to provide water for irrigation projects. It was built on a foundation of massive rhyolite, massive pitchstone, and associated unmassive pitchstone agglomerate geologic formations adjacent to the Owyhee Mountains. A project of the Bureau of Reclamation, they hired General Construction Company from Seattle to build the dam.

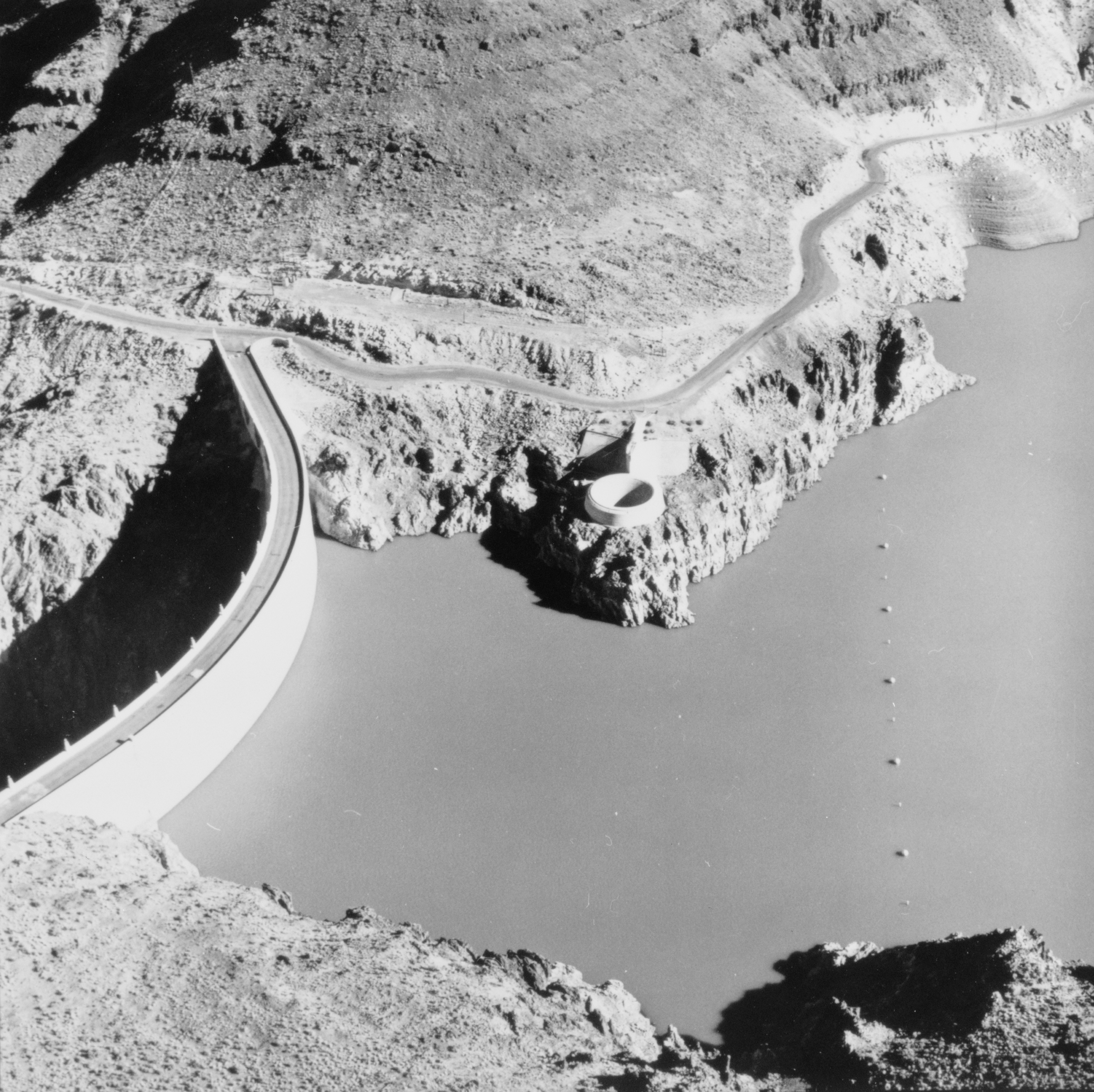

Former Oregonian and then United States President Herbert Hoover dedicated what was the highest dam of its type in the world on July 17, 1932. Secretary of the Interior Ray Lyman Wilbur delivered Hoover's message at the dam. Owyhee's construction served as a prototype for the larger Hoover Dam on the Colorado River, including the use of refrigeration to cool the concrete.

The dam cost $6 million, with the total reclamation project costing $18 million. Owyhee was designed by Frank A. Banks, who also designed other dams such as the Grand Coulee Dam on the Columbia River. In the 1980s, electricity-generating capabilities were added to the dam. From 1990 to 1993, the dam was remodeled. Since the height of the dam made a fish ladder impractical, the dam closed off the Owyhee Chinook salmon runs that used to swim as far upstream as Nevada. On September 23, 2010, the dam was added to the National Register of Historic Places as part of the Owyhee Dam Historic District.

== Operations ==
Owyhee Dam bridge
- Coordinates: 43°38′31″N 117°14′33″W
- Carries: Haystack Rock Road

Location
- Interactive map of Owyhee Dam bridge

Water stored at the reservoir is used to irrigate approximately 120,000 acres (49,000 ha) for use in farming. Four different irrigation district utilize the water from Owyhee Reservoir. There are three hydro-power generating facilities at the reservoir added between 1985 and 1993, with seven-megawatt and five-megawatt turbines at the dam and power sold to the Idaho Power Company. Owyhee has a unique spillway located part way up the dam that utilizes a 60-foot-diameter (18 m) tunnel to send excess water to the river below during Spring run-off. The United States Bureau of Reclamation owns the facility, and the Owyhee Irrigation District operates the dam.

== Climate ==
The following data are from the Western Regional Climate Center, accessed in March 2018. The record-high temperature was 112 °F (44 °C) in July 2002 and the record low was −22 °F (−30 °C) in January 1962. Annual precipitation is low, averaging less than 10 inches per year, and diurnal temperature variation is very high in the summer.

Climate data for Owyhee Dam (1991–2020 normals, extremes 1935–present)
| Month | Jan | Feb | Mar | Apr | May | Jun | Jul | Aug | Sep | Oct | Nov | Dec | Year |
|---|---|---|---|---|---|---|---|---|---|---|---|---|---|
| Record high °F (°C) | 67 (19) | 70 (21) | 81 (27) | 92 (33) | 102 (39) | 110 (43) | 112 (44) | 111 (44) | 103 (39) | 93 (34) | 80 (27) | 70 (21) | 112 (44) |
| Mean daily maximum °F (°C) | 39.8 (4.3) | 47.3 (8.5) | 57.4 (14.1) | 64.7 (18.2) | 74.6 (23.7) | 83.5 (28.6) | 94.8 (34.9) | 93.2 (34.0) | 82.5 (28.1) | 67.5 (19.7) | 50.4 (10.2) | 40.4 (4.7) | 66.3 (19.1) |
| Daily mean °F (°C) | 30.5 (−0.8) | 35.7 (2.1) | 43.5 (6.4) | 49.6 (9.8) | 58.4 (14.7) | 65.5 (18.6) | 74.7 (23.7) | 73.2 (22.9) | 63.8 (17.7) | 51.5 (10.8) | 38.3 (3.5) | 30.8 (−0.7) | 51.3 (10.7) |
| Mean daily minimum °F (°C) | 21.2 (−6.0) | 24.1 (−4.4) | 29.5 (−1.4) | 34.6 (1.4) | 42.2 (5.7) | 47.5 (8.6) | 54.5 (12.5) | 53.2 (11.8) | 45.1 (7.3) | 35.6 (2.0) | 26.1 (−3.3) | 21.2 (−6.0) | 36.2 (2.3) |
| Record low °F (°C) | −22 (−30) | −13 (−25) | 11 (−12) | 14 (−10) | 24 (−4) | 34 (1) | 35 (2) | 35 (2) | 27 (−3) | 11 (−12) | −2 (−19) | −16 (−27) | −22 (−30) |
| Average precipitation inches (mm) | 1.06 (27) | 0.71 (18) | 0.77 (20) | 0.84 (21) | 1.14 (29) | 0.85 (22) | 0.39 (9.9) | 0.21 (5.3) | 0.40 (10) | 0.54 (14) | 0.77 (20) | 1.09 (28) | 8.77 (223) |
| Average snowfall inches (cm) | 2.1 (5.3) | 0.6 (1.5) | 0.1 (0.25) | 0.0 (0.0) | 0.0 (0.0) | 0.0 (0.0) | 0.0 (0.0) | 0.0 (0.0) | 0.0 (0.0) | 0.0 (0.0) | 0.1 (0.25) | 3.1 (7.9) | 6.0 (15) |
| Average precipitation days (≥ 0.01 in) | 9.2 | 7.3 | 7.9 | 8.2 | 8.6 | 5.3 | 2.6 | 1.9 | 3.2 | 4.8 | 8.1 | 10.0 | 77.1 |
| Average snowy days (≥ 0.1 in) | 1.0 | 0.7 | 0.1 | 0.0 | 0.0 | 0.0 | 0.0 | 0.0 | 0.0 | 0.0 | 0.2 | 1.6 | 3.6 |
Source: NOAA

== Dimensions ==
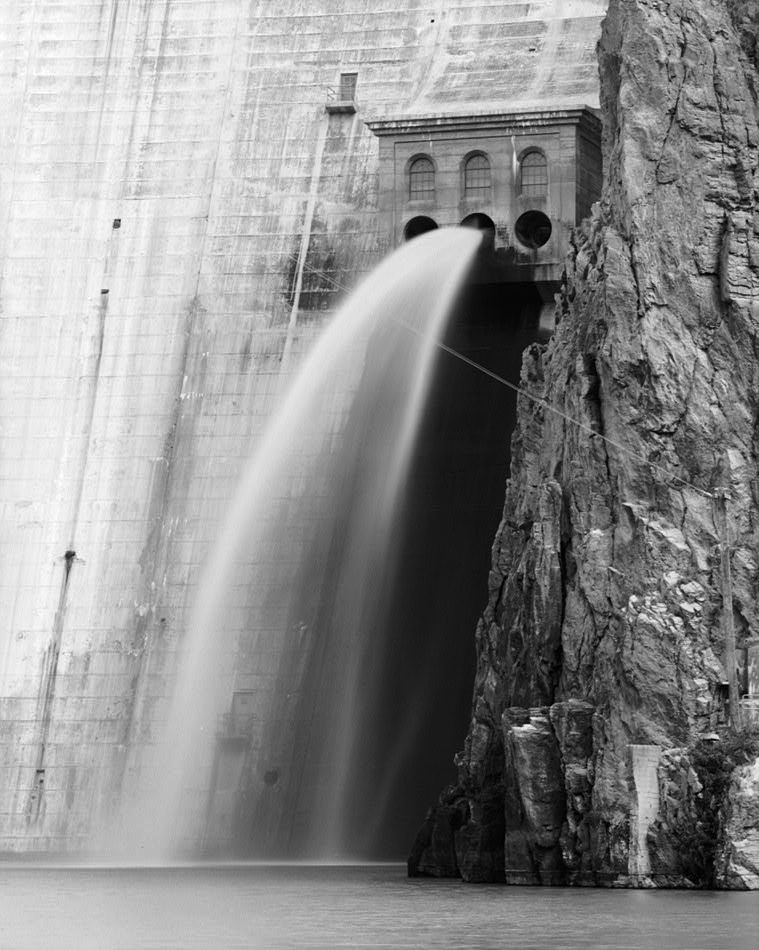
Spillway

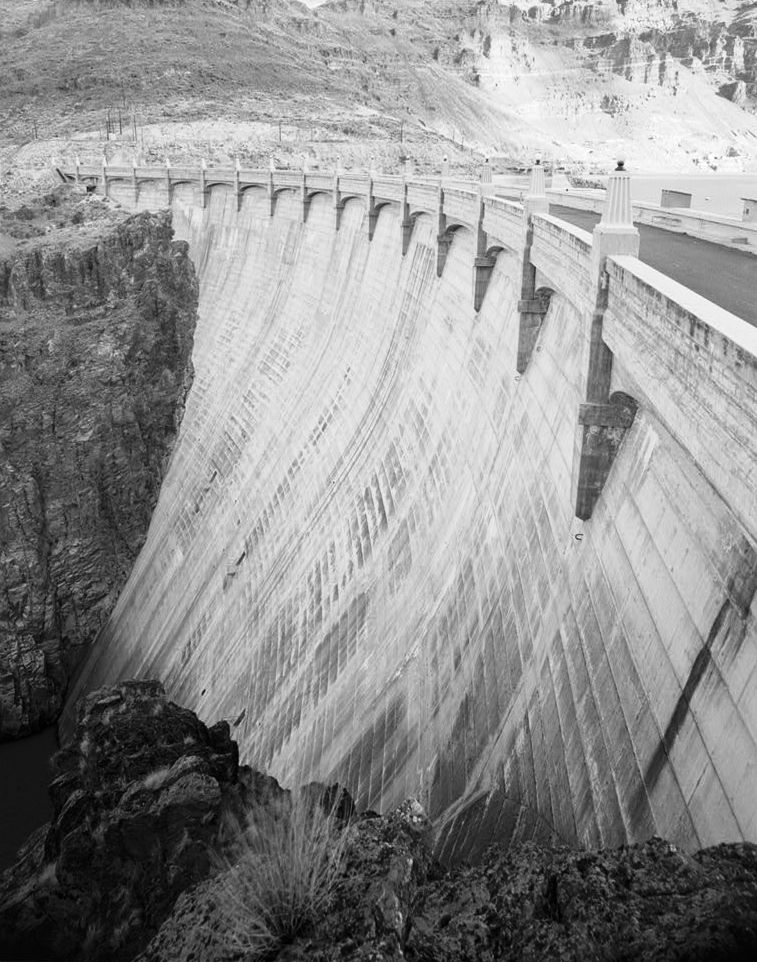
Top of the dam

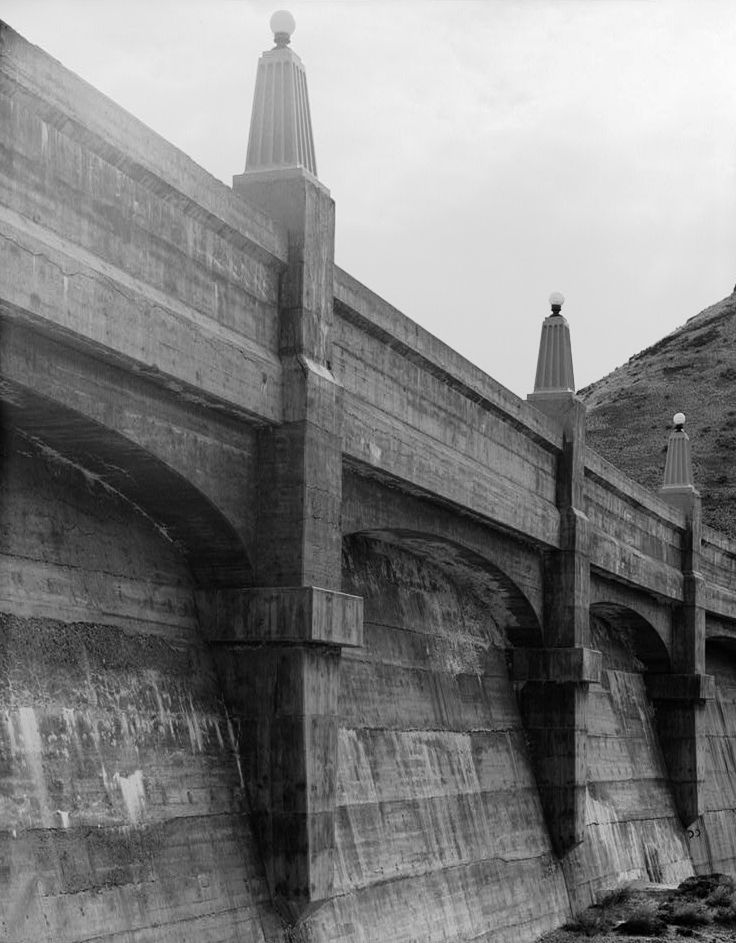
Up-close details of the crest

Owyhee Dam is 833 feet (254 m) long at the crest, which is 30 feet (9.1 m) wide. The base of the dam is 265 feet (81 m) wide, with a height of 417 feet (127 m). The crest elevation sits at 2,675 feet (815 m) above sea level and has a hydraulic height of 325 feet (99 m). Total concrete used in this arch-gravity-style dam was 537,500 cubic yards (410,900 m^{3}).

The dam's spillway can allow 41,790 cubic feet (1,183 m^{3}) per second of water flow, while its tunnel capacity is 1,100 cubic feet (31 m^{3}) per second. The outlet works can allow up to 2,530 cubic feet (72 m^{3}) per second. If full, the reservoir would hold 1.1833 million acre⋅ft (1.46 billion m^{3}) of water, and is 53 miles (85 km) long. The total drainage area of the dam and reservoir is 10,900 square miles (28,000 km^{2}) in Eastern Oregon and western Idaho.

Owyhee Dam was the tallest dam in the world until the Lac du Chambon dam was built in France in 1934 at 136.7 meters (448 ft).

== See also ==
- List of dams in the Columbia River watershed
- List of lakes of Oregon
- National Register of Historic Places listings in Malheur County, Oregon
