= DeLamar Mine =

Silver mine in Idaho, United States

Coordinates: 43.0091°N 116.8389°W

The DeLamar Mine was an open-pit silver and gold mine in Owyhee County in southwest Idaho, which operated from 1977 to 1998. John Guilbert and Charles Park Jr. have described the DeLamar mine as "the first modern open-pit silver mine." It is located about one mile from the ghost town of De Lamar, Idaho, which had been a mining center in the late 19th and early 20th century. The mine was under construction from 1975 to 1977 and began operations in 1977; the first extracted silver was poured in April 1977. The mine employed 125 workers when it opened, with the bulk of its workforce living in Jordan Valley, Oregon, around 18 miles away. At the time of its closure in 1998, the mine had five major pits and was owned by Kinross Gold Corporation.

The mine involved extracting ore from the Silver City rhyolite, a mineral formation generated by Miocene-epoch volcanic activity. The silver was primarily in the form of naumannite. Federal inspectors reporting on the mine described the silver as occurring in "an unusual form of disseminated silver locked in tiny particles within soft clay and hard, siliceous volcanic rock."

In 2017, Integra Resources Corporation acquired the DeLamar Gold and Silver Project in the hopes of finding and extracting additional precious metals on site.
