= Three Forks (Oregon) =

Locale on the Owyhee River in Malheur County, Oregon

Coordinates: 42°32′42″N 117°09′51″W

Three Forks is a locale where the main fork of the Owyhee River converges with the North Fork and Middle Fork in Malheur County, Oregon.

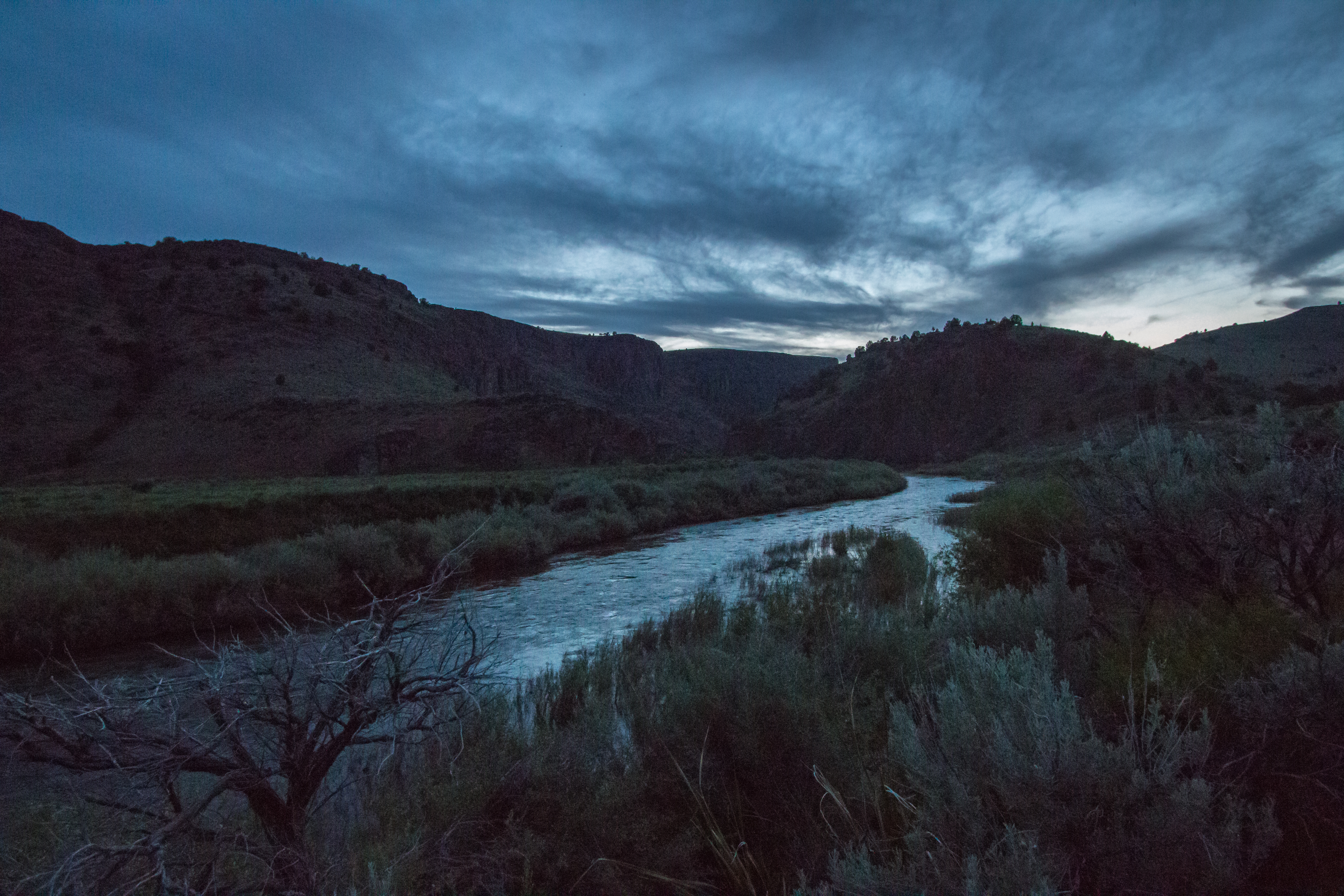
Three Forks Recreation Site

It was the site of the Battle of Three Forks during the Snake War, May 27–28, 1866. Remains of a historical military road built to access the area are still visible on the canyon's west side.
