= Danner, Oregon =

Unincorporated community in the state of Oregon, United States

- Unincorporated community
- Location within Oregon Location within the United States
- Coordinates: 42°56′40″N 117°20′25″W
- Country: United States
- State: Oregon
- County: Malheur
- Elevation: 4,232 ft (1,290 m)
- Time zone: UTC– 07:00 (Mountain)
  - Summer (DST): UTC– 06:00 (Mountain)
- ZIP Code: 97910
- Area code: 541
- GNIS feature ID: 1136202

Danner is an unincorporated community located in Malheur County, Oregon, (Western United States). The community lies along the Danner Road off U.S. Route 95 west of the Jordan Valley. Jordan Creek, a tributary of the Owyhee River (leading eventually to the Snake and Columbia Rivers) flows by Danner.

== History ==
The historic Idaho–Oregon–Nevada highway once ran through Danner, following the earlier Skinner Toll Road. This route opened the region to settlement beginning in 1863, during the American Civil War.

Danner is the burial place of Jean Baptiste Charbonneau (1805–1866), also known as "Pompey" or "Little Pomp" Charbonneau, the infant son of Sacagawea and Toussaint Charbonneau. Little Pomp Charbonneau was the youngest member of the Lewis and Clark Expedition. Sacagawea carried him during the expedition's journey from the Missouri River, across the Rocky Mountains, and through the Pacific Northwest to the Pacific Ocean.

Charbonneau died near Danner on May 16, 1866, after developing pneumonia while crossing the Owyhee River. His grave, located near the former Inskip Station, was identified and marked in the 20th century through the efforts of local residents Kirt and Johanna Skinner. It was added to the National Register of Historic Places on March 14, 1973. A plaque marks the ruins of Inskip Station within view of the Charbonneau grave.

Around 1910, Harley J. Hooker platted the proposed Ruby Townsite when the Jordan Valley Irrigation District began constructing a dam and canal system near Danner. The town never developed as planned due to the region's harsh high-desert climate. Around 1915, Hooker built a one-story lava-rock office building, which later served as the community hall. It eventually became unsafe and was demolished.

The community was named for early settler John H. Danner. An application to name the local post office "Ruby" was rejected by the Post Office Department; the name Danner was approved in 1920. The post office operated until 1942.

During the 1930s, Danner had a general store owned by Jesse Anderson, a Danish immigrant. The building remains standing about half a mile south of the Inskip Station site.

== Climate ==
According to the Köppen Climate Classification system, Danner has a semi-arid climate, abbreviated "BSk" on climate maps.

Climate data for Danner, Oregon, 1981–2010 normals, extremes 1929–2017
Month	Jan	Feb	Mar	Apr	May	Jun	Jul	Aug	Sep	Oct	Nov	Dec	Year
Record high °F (°C)	62 (17)	69 (21)	78 (26)	87 (31)	99 (37)	106 (41)	109 (43)	105 (41)	104 (40)	93 (34)	86 (30)	67 (19)	109 (43)
Mean maximum °F (°C)	50.7 (10.4)	57.3 (14.1)	66.8 (19.3)	77.4 (25.2)	85.6 (29.8)	92.6 (33.7)	98.8 (37.1)	96.8 (36.0)	91.0 (32.8)	80.3 (26.8)	64.4 (18.0)	52.1 (11.2)	99.3 (37.4)
Mean daily maximum °F (°C)	37.4 (3.0)	43.1 (6.2)	51.3 (10.7)	58.7 (14.8)	67.0 (19.4)	75.5 (24.2)	86.6 (30.3)	85.5 (29.7)	75.8 (24.3)	62.6 (17.0)	46.7 (8.2)	37.1 (2.8)	60.6 (15.9)
Daily mean °F (°C)	27.4 (−2.6)	31.5 (−0.3)	38.9 (3.8)	44.3 (6.8)	52.3 (11.3)	59.7 (15.4)	67.7 (19.8)	66.1 (18.9)	57.0 (13.9)	45.8 (7.7)	34.8 (1.6)	27.0 (−2.8)	46.0 (7.8)
Mean daily minimum °F (°C)	17.3 (−8.2)	19.8 (−6.8)	26.5 (−3.1)	29.9 (−1.2)	37.6 (3.1)	43.9 (6.6)	48.9 (9.4)	46.6 (8.1)	38.2 (3.4)	28.9 (−1.7)	23.0 (−5.0)	17.0 (−8.3)	31.5 (−0.3)
Mean minimum °F (°C)	−3.3 (−19.6)	1.9 (−16.7)	13.3 (−10.4)	16.3 (−8.7)	22.4 (−5.3)	31.4 (−0.3)	38.1 (3.4)	36.3 (2.4)	25.2 (−3.8)	13.2 (−10.4)	4.7 (−15.2)	−2.8 (−19.3)	−10.4 (−23.6)
Record low °F (°C)	−52 (−47)	−46 (−43)	−12 (−24)	5 (−15)	11 (−12)	18 (−8)	22 (−6)	20 (−7)	10 (−12)	−4 (−20)	−26 (−32)	−34 (−37)	−52 (−47)
Average precipitation inches (mm)	1.15 (29)	0.79 (20)	1.06 (27)	1.12 (28)	1.41 (36)	0.96 (24)	0.63 (16)	0.30 (7.6)	0.51 (13)	0.67 (17)	1.14 (29)	1.47 (37)	10.90 (277)
Source 1: NOAA
Source 2: National Weather Service

== See also ==
- List of ghost towns in Oregon
- Lewis and Clark Expedition
- National Register of Historic Places listings in Malheur County, Oregon
