= Rome, Oregon =

Unincorporated community in the state of Oregon, United States

- Unincorporated community
- Location within Oregon Location within the United States
- Coordinates: 42°50′21″N 117°37′42″W
- Country: United States
- State: Oregon
- County: Malheur
- Elevation: 3,386 ft (1,032 m)
- Time zone: UTC−07:00 (Mountain (MST))
  - Summer (DST): UTC−06:00 (MDT)
- Area code: 541
- GNIS feature ID: 1126268

Rome, also called Rome Station after its sole business, is an unincorporated community in Malheur County, Oregon, United States. The community is part of the Ontario, OR–ID Micropolitan Statistical Area. In the sparsely populated high desert of southeastern Oregon, Rome is immediately west of the Owyhee River on U.S. Route 95, approximately 12 miles (19 km) northeast of Burns Junction. Jordan Creek enters the river slightly downstream of Rome.

== Name ==
According to Oregon Geographic Names, Rome was named by William F. Stine for the nearby geologic formations that suggested the ruined temples of Rome, Italy. The 100-foot (30 m)-high Rome Cliffs, or "Pillars of Rome" are formations of fossil-bearing clay, measuring about 5 miles (8 km) long, and 2 miles (3 km) wide.

== Post offices ==
Rome's former post office was established in 1909. Leonard R. Duncan was the first postmaster. Postal service is now out of Jordan Valley.

In the mid-19th century, there was another Oregon community named Rome. It was in Marion County, near Woodburn, and had a post office in 1851–52.

== Transportation ==
Rome State Airport is near Rome. In addition to U.S. Route 95, several high-desert roads converge at or near Rome. These include the Old Idaho–Oregon–Nevada Highway, Rome Road, Skull Creek Road, and Indian Fort Creek Road.

== Climate ==
Rome has a cold desert climate (BWk) according to the Köppen climate classification system.

Climate data for Rome, Oregon, 1991–2020 normals, extremes 1950–present
| Month | Jan | Feb | Mar | Apr | May | Jun | Jul | Aug | Sep | Oct | Nov | Dec | Year |
|---|---|---|---|---|---|---|---|---|---|---|---|---|---|
| Record high °F (°C) | 67 (19) | 71 (22) | 81 (27) | 91 (33) | 100 (38) | 105 (41) | 110 (43) | 108 (42) | 105 (41) | 97 (36) | 78 (26) | 65 (18) | 110 (43) |
| Mean maximum °F (°C) | 55.6 (13.1) | 61.4 (16.3) | 72.8 (22.7) | 81.3 (27.4) | 90.1 (32.3) | 97.3 (36.3) | 103.4 (39.7) | 101.1 (38.4) | 95.5 (35.3) | 84.3 (29.1) | 68.9 (20.5) | 56.5 (13.6) | 103.8 (39.9) |
| Mean daily maximum °F (°C) | 41.1 (5.1) | 48.2 (9.0) | 57.7 (14.3) | 64.1 (17.8) | 73.3 (22.9) | 82.6 (28.1) | 93.4 (34.1) | 91.7 (33.2) | 82.2 (27.9) | 67.7 (19.8) | 51.5 (10.8) | 40.1 (4.5) | 66.1 (19.0) |
| Daily mean °F (°C) | 29.5 (−1.4) | 34.7 (1.5) | 41.5 (5.3) | 46.9 (8.3) | 55.4 (13.0) | 63.3 (17.4) | 71.8 (22.1) | 69.4 (20.8) | 60.2 (15.7) | 48.1 (8.9) | 36.7 (2.6) | 28.5 (−1.9) | 48.8 (9.4) |
| Mean daily minimum °F (°C) | 17.9 (−7.8) | 21.2 (−6.0) | 25.3 (−3.7) | 29.7 (−1.3) | 37.5 (3.1) | 44.0 (6.7) | 50.2 (10.1) | 47.1 (8.4) | 38.2 (3.4) | 28.5 (−1.9) | 21.9 (−5.6) | 17.0 (−8.3) | 31.5 (−0.2) |
| Mean minimum °F (°C) | 1.1 (−17.2) | 7.8 (−13.4) | 12.9 (−10.6) | 16.6 (−8.6) | 22.8 (−5.1) | 31.5 (−0.3) | 39.8 (4.3) | 37.0 (2.8) | 25.8 (−3.4) | 14.2 (−9.9) | 5.3 (−14.8) | 0.2 (−17.7) | −6.4 (−21.3) |
| Record low °F (°C) | −31 (−35) | −17 (−27) | −4 (−20) | 9 (−13) | 13 (−11) | 14 (−10) | 19 (−7) | 28 (−2) | 15 (−9) | −6 (−21) | −11 (−24) | −26 (−32) | −31 (−35) |
| Average precipitation inches (mm) | 0.83 (21) | 0.65 (17) | 0.71 (18) | 1.05 (27) | 1.45 (37) | 1.00 (25) | 0.31 (7.9) | 0.21 (5.3) | 0.42 (11) | 0.73 (19) | 0.70 (18) | 0.89 (23) | 8.95 (229.2) |
| Average precipitation days (≥ 0.01 in) | 8.8 | 7.0 | 9.1 | 10.1 | 9.6 | 7.1 | 2.2 | 2.0 | 2.9 | 6.6 | 8.8 | 9.7 | 83.9 |
Source 1: NOAA
Source 2: National Weather Service

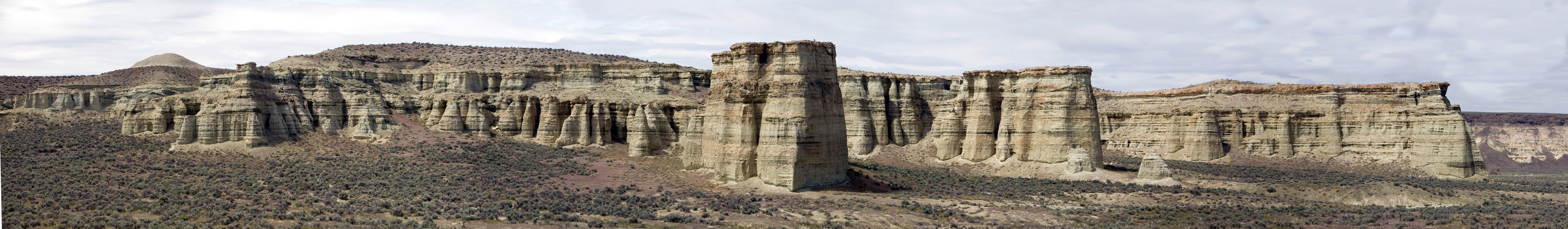
Pillars of Rome in southeastern Oregon

== Education ==
It is in Arock School District 81.
