= Mahogany Mountain =

Part of a Caldera in the state of Oregon

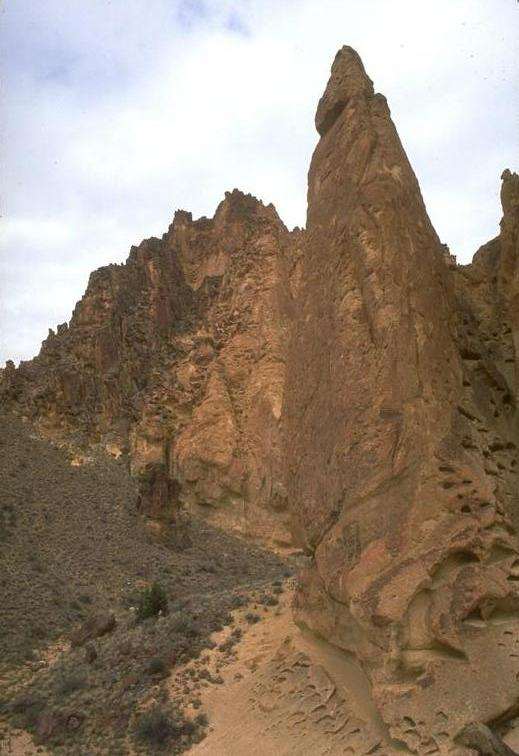
- Leslie Gulch rock spire, Mahogany Mountain, Oregon. Photo: BLM (2008).

Highest point
- Elevation: 6,526 ft (1,989 m) NAVD 88
- Prominence: 1,892 ft (577 m)
- Coordinates: 43°14′06″N 117°15′21″W

Geography
- Location within Oregon Location within the United States
- Location: Malheur County, Oregon, U.S.
- Parent range: Owyhee Mountains
- Topo map: USGS McCain Creek

Geology
- Last eruption: 15.5 million years ago

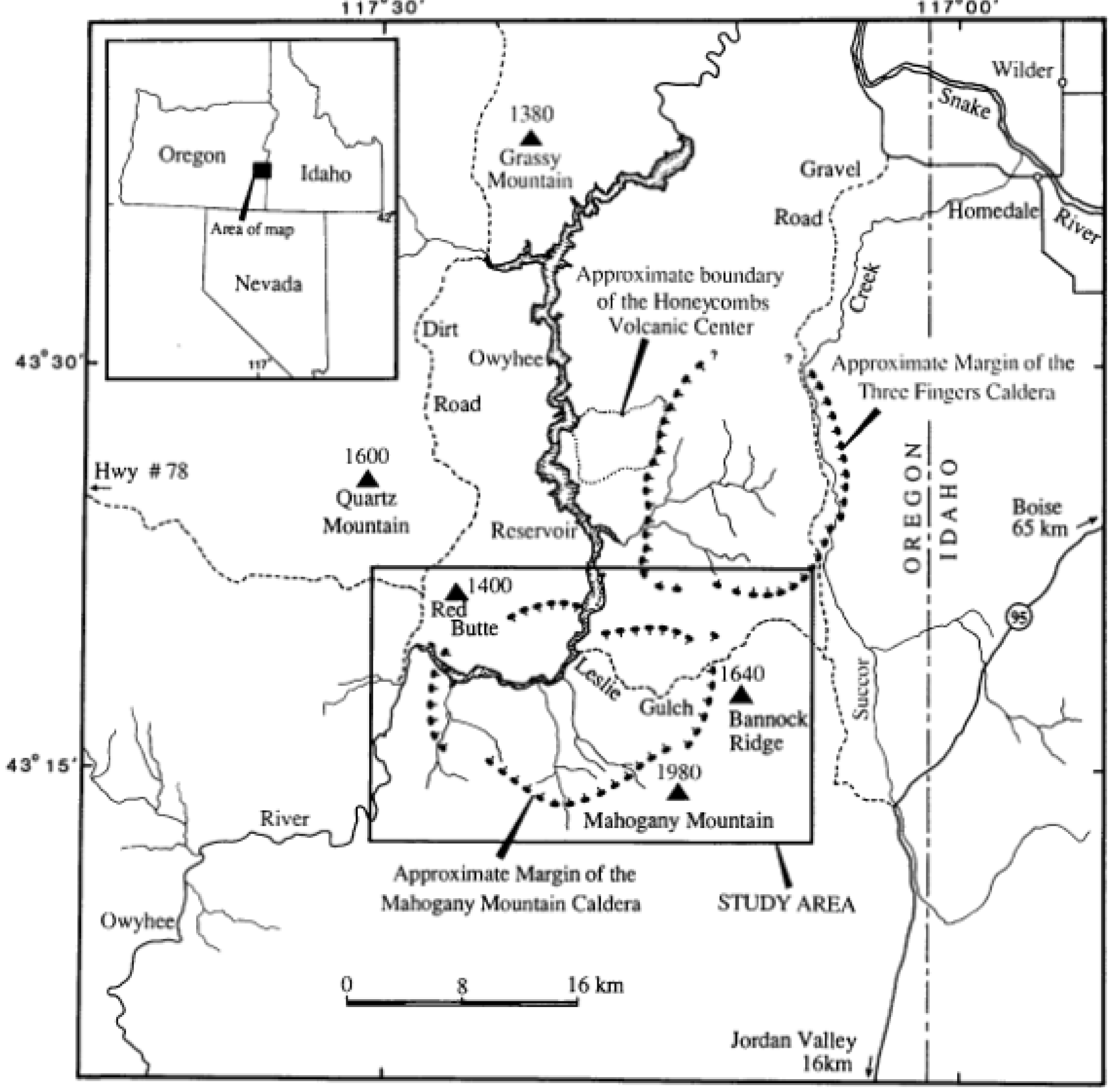
Map showing location of Mahogany Mountain and the caldera.

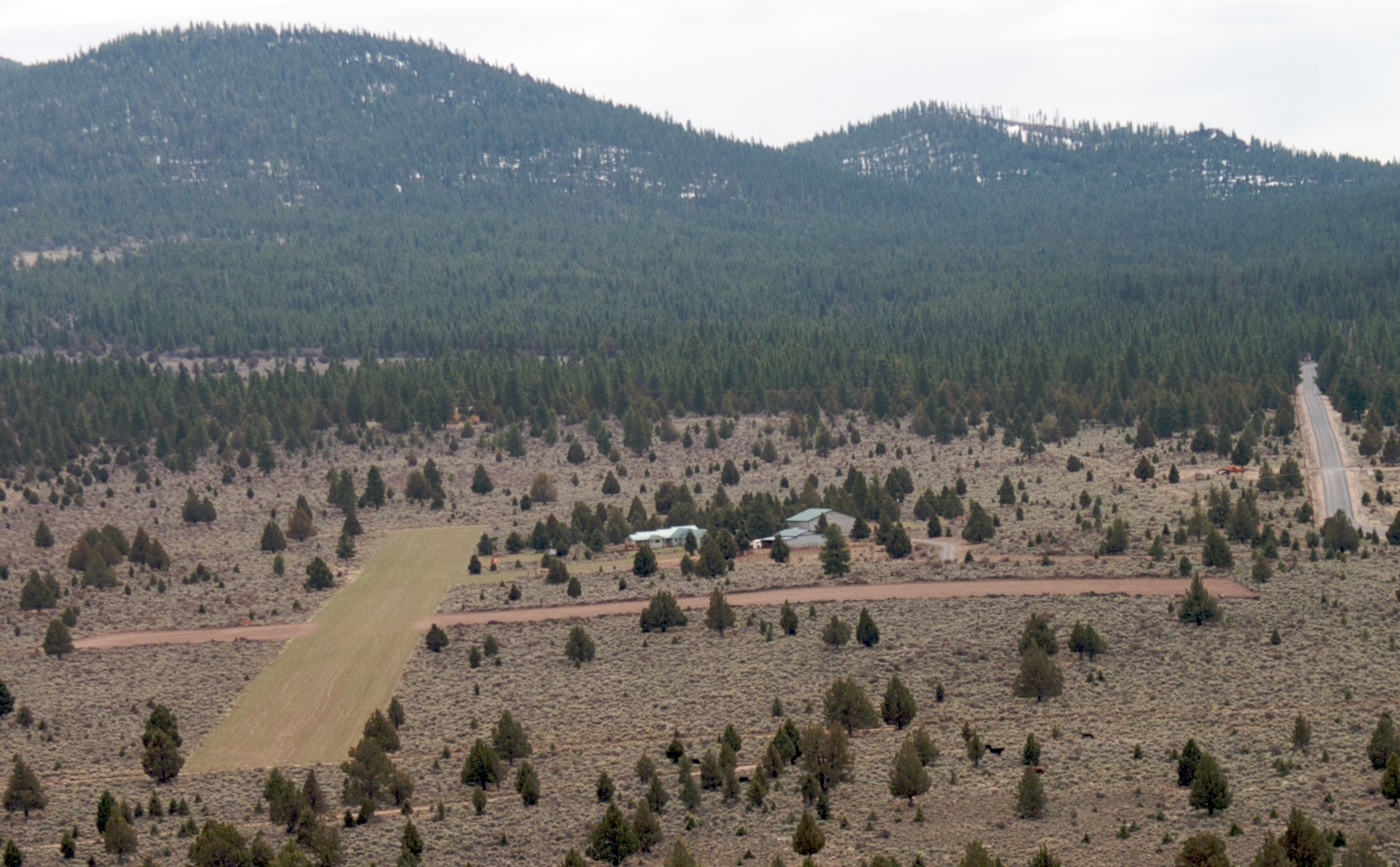
Aerial photograph of Mahogany Mountain airport (1JY2), Oregon

Mahogany Mountain is an ancient caldera volcano on the border of Oregon and Idaho, in Malheur County and Owyhee County, respectively. While its early history is largely unknown, its last eruption was probably 15.5 million years ago. This eruption ejected layers of rhyolite and produced tuff, creating formations of rock in the Leslie Gulch.

Nearby features include the Owyhee River, historically used as a fishing and camping ground for early Native Americans. The climate of the area tends to be extreme; that is, it is cold in the winter and hot in summer. Sparse vegetation is present, including shrubs and patches of juniper.

== Geography and geology ==
A part of the Basin and Range Province, the volcano's most recent eruptive activity dates to approximately 15 million years ago (the Miocene), forming during a period of active volcanism including eruptions of ignimbrite and ash. It formed around the same time as Three Fingers, Castle Peak, and three other volcanoes. Today the volcano appears gnarled due to erosion and is topped by pine forests. The caldera is narrow and shaped like a ridge, with precipitous slopes and an escarpment on the northwest flank. It consists of rhyolite tuff and sedimentary layers.

Leslie Gulch lies within the depression of the volcano. Layers of ash and tuff are evident in the formation, and leftover volcanic rocks sit in it as well. The gulch features an array of rock formations and ash erupted from the volcano approximately 15.5 million years ago.

== History ==
The nearby Owyhee River was utilized by Native Americans as early as 5,000 years before European habitation of the area. It served as a source of food, both for fishing and hunting, and the natives often camped along its banks.

== Climate and vegetation ==
The area by the volcano features cold winters and hot summers, with only 25 centimeters (10 in) of rainfall each year. Steppe-like shrubs make up the majority of the vegetation, though juniper is present in patches. There are 64 known mammalian species in the area.
