= Museum of Human Beings =

Novel by Colin Sargent

- Author: Colin Sargent
- Genre: Historical fiction
- Publisher: McBooks Press
- Publication date: December 1, 2008
- Media type: Print (Hardcover)
- ISBN: 978-1-59013-167-1
- OCLC: 227927996
- Dewey Decimal: 813.6
- LC Class: PS3619.A735M87 2008

Museum of Human Beings is a 2008 historical novel by Colin Sargent about the life of Jean Baptiste Charbonneau, the son of Sacagawea.

== Inspiration ==
Sargent describes his inspiration writing the novel in a Portland Press Herald interview with Meredith Goad: "From my earliest times I always wondered, what happened to this little boy? What happened to the expedition papoose?"

== Plot ==
The novel's protagonist is Jean Baptiste Charbonneau, the son of Sacajawea and the youngest member of the Lewis and Clark Expedition. He is adopted by William Clark, who had developed a romantic relationship with his mother. As an adolescent Charbonneau gains the notice of Duke Paul Wilhelm of Württemberg and is taken to Europe to be educated, only to be displayed as an exotic curiosity. Charbonneau eventually returns to the United States and reckons with his past and the legacy of his mother.

== Reviews ==
Publishers Weekly wrote that "Sargent's debut novel is a stylish look at the fate of Sacagawea's baby son, Jean Baptiste Charbonneau". Melody Ballard in Library Journal said, "This memorable novel will captivate all who read it." Sybil Downing's review in the Denver Post states, "Museum of Human Beings is rich with unusual historical detail. Clark is presented as a far more intriguing and complex man than standard history would have us know. It is a fascinating and ultimately tragic tale of a usually forgotten player in this country's story." William Barry in the Portland Press Herald wrote, "Sargent revels in the uncertainty of the human comedy and no doubt takes his model for the book from Voltaire's 'Candide' (1759)."

In her review for the Historical Novel Society, Julie K. Rose provides a differing opinion. She says, "The book is beautifully written, and has a good sense of time and place, but I felt held at a distance. Though Baptiste's life was full of adventure and tragedy, I found it hard to really care about him, and watched his struggles as though he were the subject of an anthropological study. Perhaps, given the themes and subjects of the story, this was intentional—he seemed like another exhibit in Clark's Museum of Human Beings, and not a flesh-and-blood person to struggle with and care for."
