= Jordan Valley, Oregon =

- City
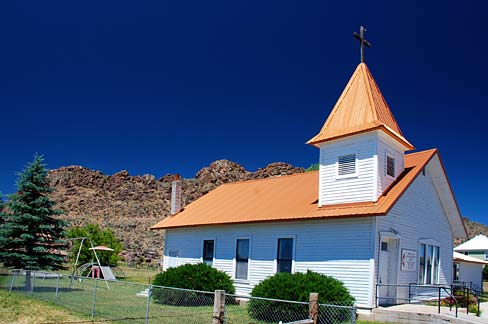
- The Jordan Valley Methodist Church
- Motto: "Heart of the Owyhees"
- Location in Oregon
- Coordinates: 42°58′46″N 117°03′27″W
- Country: United States
- State: Oregon
- County: Malheur
- Incorporated: 1911

Area
  - Total: 2.08 sq mi (5.39 km^{2})
  - Land: 2.08 sq mi (5.39 km^{2})
  - Water: 0 sq mi (0.00 km^{2})
- Elevation: 4,515 ft (1,376 m)

Population (2020)
  - Total: 130
  - Density: 62.5/sq mi (24.13/km^{2})
- Time zone: UTC-7 (Mountain)
  - Summer (DST): UTC-6 (Mountain)
- ZIP code: 97910
- Area codes: 458 and 541
- FIPS code: 41-37850
- GNIS feature ID: 2410149

Jordan Valley is a city in Malheur County, Oregon, United States. It is part of the Ontario, OR–ID Micropolitan Statistical Area. The city lies along Jordan Creek, a tributary of the Owyhee River; the creek is named for a 19th-century prospector, Michael M. Jordan. The population was 130 at the 2020 census.

== History ==
=== Indigenous peoples ===
Northern Paiute people were the first in the area, frequenting nearby mountains and streambeds to find or follow food sources. When early settlers arrived, conflict developed over local resources, eventually escalating to the Snake War. The conflict lasted from 1864 to 1868 and left two thirds of the Paiutes dead. The surviving Paiutes were sent to a reservation.

=== Early settlement ===
Non-native settlement in the area was largely driven by the 1863 discovery of gold along Jordan Creek by a group of prospectors camping in the area. Soon after, the area was named Jordan Valley after Michael M. Jordan, one of the men in the group.

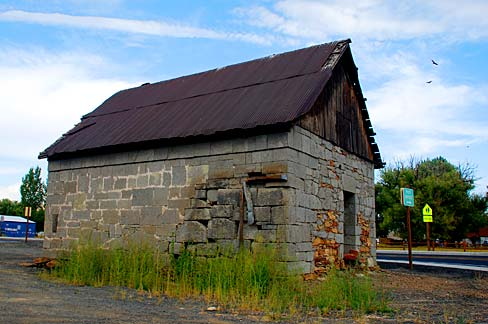
Jordan Valley Building

Jean Baptiste Charbonneau, the son of Sacagawea, was among the early miners who came to the area.

Another miner named Silas Skinner organized a small team and built a road to more easily access Jordan Creek. The road passed through the current-day location of Jordan Valley, which soon became a pack station where miners would wait for snow to melt enough to access the mining area. The town also served as a rest stop for those travelling between larger mining towns such as Silver City, Ruby City, and De Lamar. A post office opened in 1867 in the cabin of John Baxter, one of the first permanent residents of Jordan Valley. Skinner operated his toll road until 1878, when the Owyhee County Commissioners took over responsibility for all roads in the area. He then settled in Jordan Valley and opened the Skinner Ranch.

=== Economic transition ===
When mining declined in the area and populations of boomtowns like Silver City dwindled around 1875, residents of Jordan Valley survived by transitioning to ranching. By 1867, 11 ranches were operating locally. In 1888, there were an estimated 100,000 head of cattle in the area. Ranching supported continuing growth of the community until the Great Depression struck in 1929. This financial hardship, coupled with the remoteness of the town (and subsequent lack of law enforcement) made bootlegging grow in popularity during the last few years of Prohibition.

=== Basque immigration ===
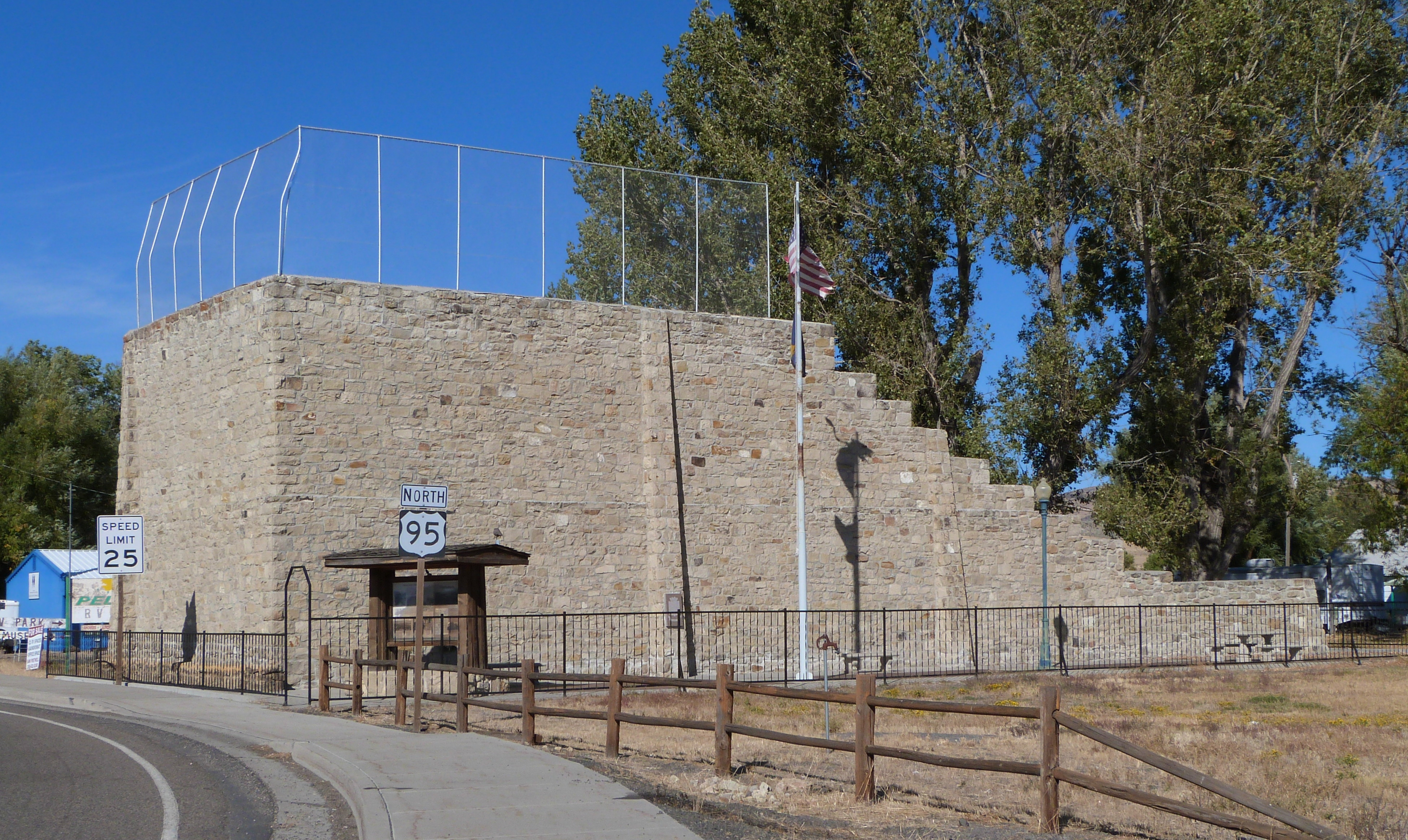
Pelota Fronton exterior

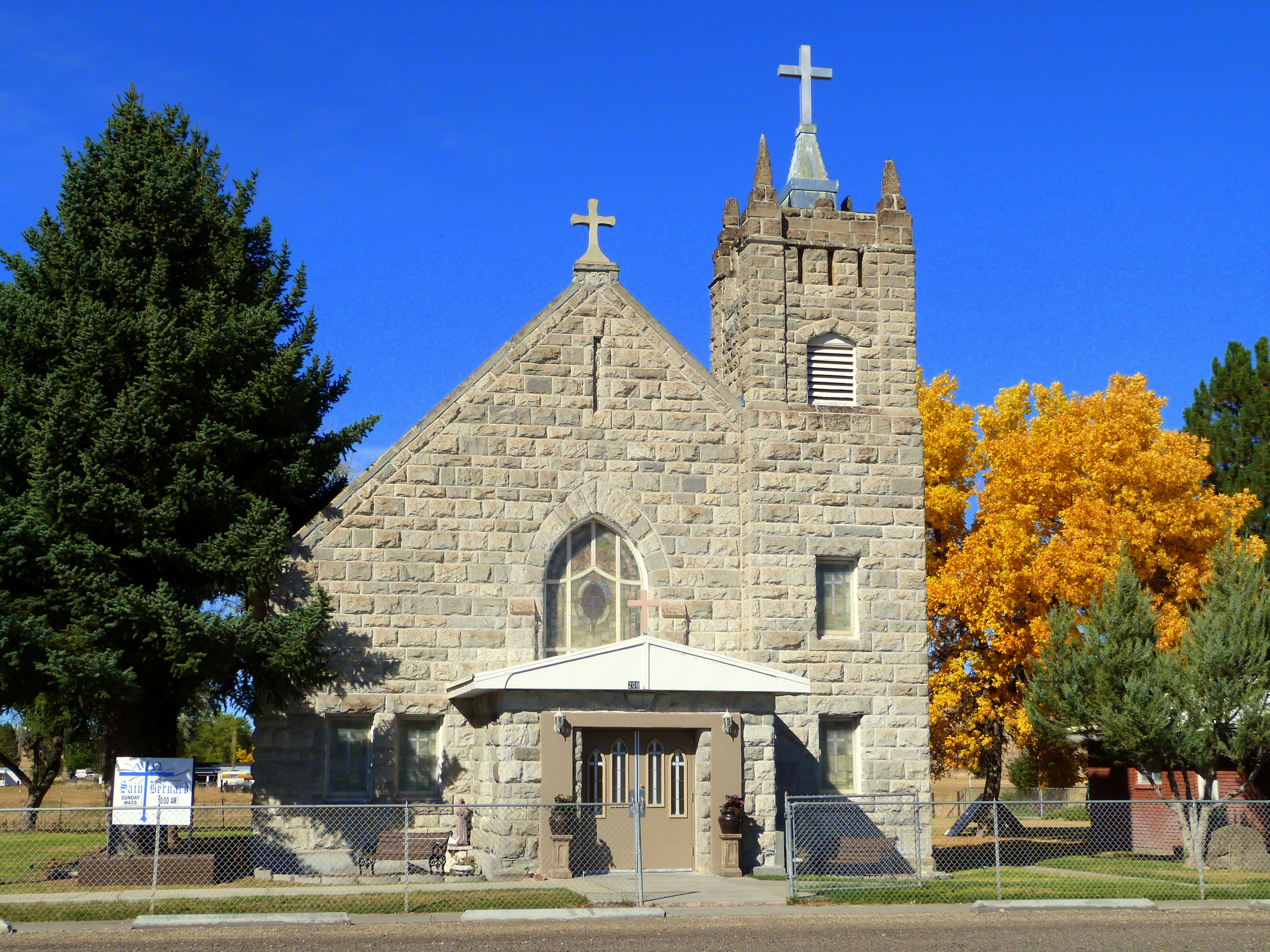
St. Bernard Church

Many Basque immigrants came to Jordan Valley, starting around 1889 with the arrival of José Navarro and Antone Azcuenaga. Local oral history claims that before long, the Basques comprised around two thirds of the population of the town. A pelota court, known as the Pelota Fronton, was built in 1915, and still stands as a historic landmark. The Basques also constructed several sandstone buildings, including three boarding houses, and (with the help of local Irish immigrants) the St. Bernard's Catholic Church, which can still be seen today. Basque immigration to the area slowed with the passing of the Taylor Grazing Act of 1934, which favored cattle ranching over sheep, the Basques' preferred livestock. To this day, a majority of the town's population identify as being of Basque Heritage.

=== Declining population ===
Jordan Valley's population steadily dwindled after the 1920s, with the only notable growth being correlated with the 1977 opening of the DeLamar Mine, and its reopening by the Kinross Gold Corporation in 1993, when the population grew from 376 to 446. The mine closed in 1999, and by 2016, the population of Jordan Valley had dwindled to around 175. In 2017, Integra Resources Corporation purchased the mine, but as of 2019, is still in the process of researching and planning future silver mining operations for the site.

Residents travel to a grocery store in Homedale, Idaho as the last grocery store in Jordan Valley closed in 2001.

== Geography ==
According to the United States Census Bureau, the city has a total area of 2.08 square miles (5.39 km^{2}), all of it land.

Jordan Valley's most prominent geographical landmark is the blunt plateau across Jordan Creek and adjacent to town, Pharmacy Hill.

Jordan Valley's main occupations are cattle ranching and sheep herding. People in those occupations typically live far from town on homesteads, but use Jordan Valley as their cultural and economic center. People within Jordan Valley primarily provide a number of services to tourists passing through on U.S. Route 95, which is the primary road from Boise, Idaho to Reno, Nevada.

Jordan Valley is known for its excellent hunting and fishing as well as its proximity to Jordan Craters, an extinct volcanic field. Other popular areas nearby include Leslie Gulch, Cow Lakes, Antelope Reservoir, and Three Forks to the south.

== Demographics ==
Historical population
Census	Pop.	Note	%±
1900	110		—
1910	200		81.8%
1920	355		77.5%
1930	306		−13.8%
1940	274		−10.5%
1950	236		−13.9%
1960	204		−13.6%
1970	196		−3.9%
1980	473		141.3%
1990	364		−23.0%
2000	239		−34.3%
2010	181		−24.3%
2020	130		−28.2%

=== 2020 census ===
As of the 2020 census, Jordan Valley had a population of 130. The median age was 61.8 years. 8.5% of residents were under the age of 18 and 41.5% of residents were 65 years of age or older. For every 100 females there were 88.4 males, and for every 100 females age 18 and over there were 85.9 males.

0% of residents lived in urban areas, while 100.0% lived in rural areas.

There were 81 households in Jordan Valley, of which 21.0% had children under the age of 18 living in them. Of all households, 30.9% were married-couple households, 24.7% were households with a male householder and no spouse or partner present, and 37.0% were households with a female householder and no spouse or partner present. About 45.6% of all households were made up of individuals and 19.7% had someone living alone who was 65 years of age or older.

There were 138 housing units, of which 41.3% were vacant. Among occupied housing units, 76.5% were owner-occupied and 23.5% were renter-occupied. The homeowner vacancy rate was 6.1% and the rental vacancy rate was 20.8%.

Racial composition as of the 2020 census
Race	Number	Percent
White	110	84.6%
Black or African American	0	0%
American Indian and Alaska Native	0	0%
Asian	3	2.3%
Native Hawaiian and Other Pacific Islander	0	0%
Some other race	10	7.7%
Two or more races	7	5.4%
Hispanic or Latino (of any race)	19	14.6%

=== 2010 census ===
As of the census of 2010, there were 181 people, 94 households, and 53 families residing in the city. The population density was 87.0 inhabitants per square mile (33.6/km^{2}). There were 149 housing units at an average density of 71.6 per square mile (27.6/km^{2}). The racial makeup of the city was 95.0% White, 3.3% Native American, and 1.7% from two or more races. Hispanic or Latino of any race were 6.6% of the population.

There were 94 households, of which 17.0% had children under the age of 18 living with them, 41.5% were married couples living together, 9.6% had a female householder with no husband present, 5.3% had a male householder with no wife present, and 43.6% were non-families. 35.1% of all households were made up of individuals, and 14.9% had someone living alone who was 65 years of age or older. The average household size was 1.93 and the average family size was 2.45.

The median age in the city was 55.9 years. 14.9% of residents were under the age of 18; 2.2% were between the ages of 18 and 24; 12.7% were from 25 to 44; 38.1% were from 45 to 64; and 32% were 65 years of age or older. The gender makeup of the city was 49.7% male and 50.3% female.

=== 2000 census ===
As of the census of 2000, there were 239 people, 109 households, and 66 families residing in the city. The population density was 114.6 inhabitants per square mile (44.2/km^{2}). There were 140 housing units at an average density of 67.2 per square mile (25.9/km^{2}). The racial makeup of the city was 93.72% White, 0.42% Asian, 0.42% Pacific Islander, 1.67% from other races, and 3.77% from two or more races. Hispanic or Latino of any race were 2.09% of the population.

There were 109 households, out of which 20.2% had children under the age of 18 living with them, 50.5% were married couples living together, 6.4% had a female householder with no husband present, and 39.4% were non-families. 36.7% of all households were made up of individuals, and 16.5% had someone living alone who was 65 years of age or older. The average household size was 2.17 and the average family size was 2.85.

In the city, the population was spread out, with 22.6% under the age of 18, 5.4% from 18 to 24, 20.9% from 25 to 44, 30.5% from 45 to 64, and 20.5% who were 65 years of age or older. The median age was 45 years. For every 100 females, there were 88.2 males. For every 100 females age 18 and over, there were 86.9 males.

The median income for a household in the city was $25,313, and the median income for a family was $37,500. Males had a median income of $32,917 versus $16,750 for females. The per capita income for the city was $14,501. About 13.5% of families and 20.5% of the population were below the poverty line, including 22.0% of those under the age of 18 and 8.9% of those 65 or over.

== Healthcare ==
Nampa, Idaho has the hospital in the closest proximity.

== Education ==
Jordan Valley is served by the Jordan Valley School District 3, including Jordan Valley High School.

The section of Malheur County in which this community is located in is not in any community college district.
