= Owyhee River =

River in Nevada, Idaho, and Oregon, United States

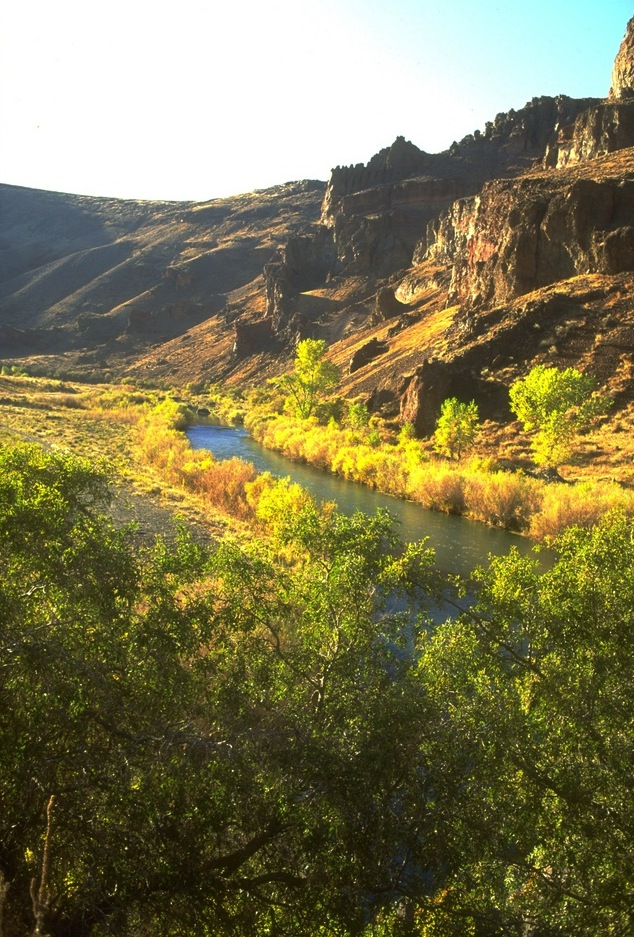
- The Owyhee River

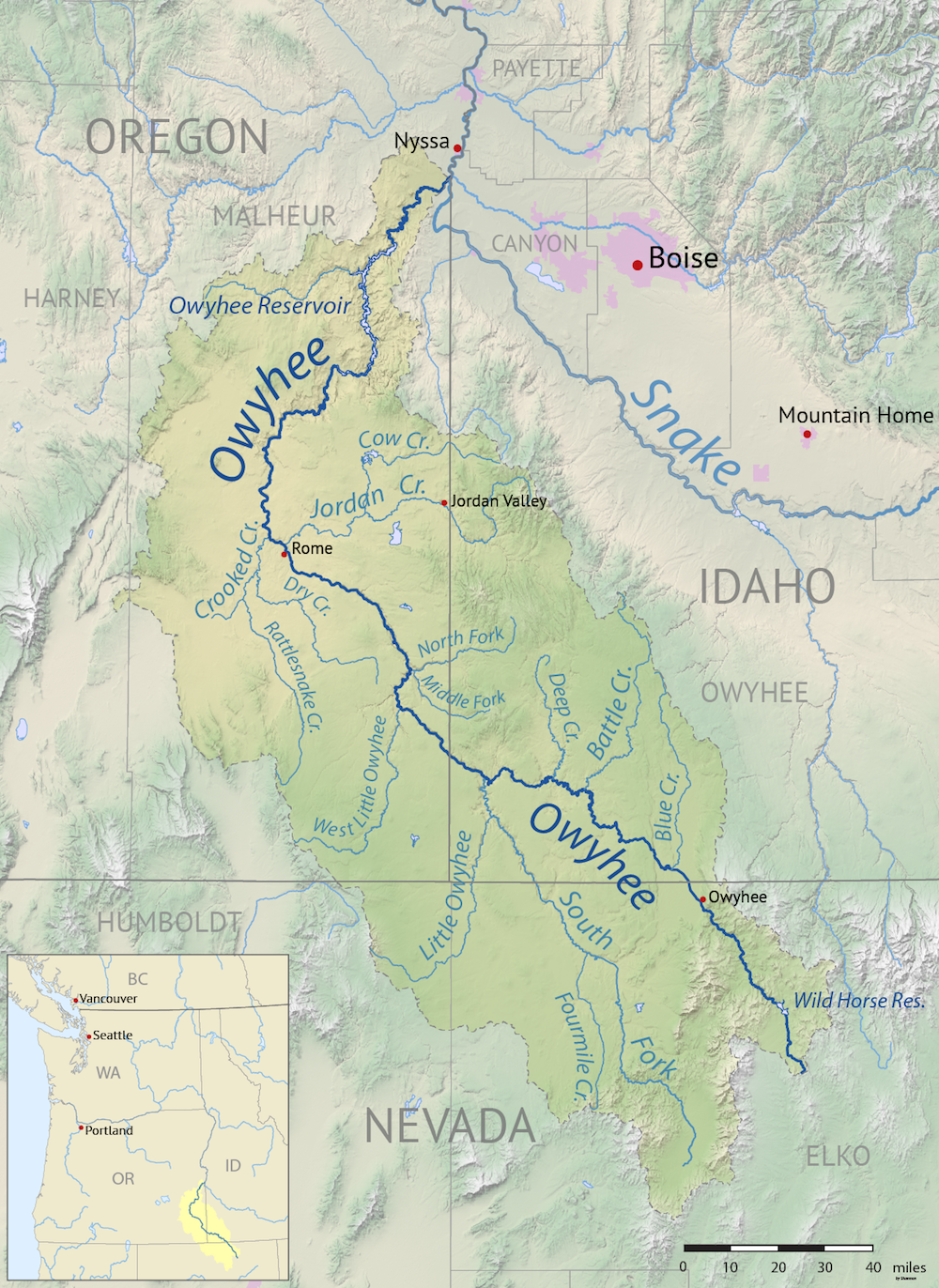
- Map of the Owyhee River watershed

Location
- Country: United States
- State: Nevada, Idaho, Oregon
- City: Rome, Oregon

Physical characteristics
- Source: Near Wild Horse
  - location: Elko County, Nevada
  - coordinates: 41°30′17″N 115°44′30″W
  - elevation: 6,860 ft (2,090 m)
- Mouth: Snake River
  - location: Canyon County, Idaho/Malheur County, Oregon
  - coordinates: 43°48′46″N 117°01′32″W
  - elevation: 2,185 ft (666 m)
- Length: 280 mi (450 km)
- Basin size: 11,049 sq mi (28,620 km^{2})
- Discharge
  - location: Owyhee, OR, 1 mi (1.6 km) from the mouth
  - average: 1,146 cu ft/s (32.5 m^{3}/s)
  - minimum: 3.2 cu ft/s (0.091 m^{3}/s)
  - maximum: 29,000 cu ft/s (820 m^{3}/s)

National Wild and Scenic River
- Type: Wild
- Designated: March 30, 2009

The Owyhee River is a tributary of the Snake River located in northern Nevada, southwestern Idaho and southeastern Oregon in the Western United States and its Pacific Northwest region. It is 280 miles (450 km) long. The river's drainage basin is 11,049 square miles (28,620 km^{2}) in area, one of the largest subbasins of the Columbia River Basin with its major waterways of the Columbia River and Snake River. The mean annual discharge is 995 cubic feet per second (28.2 m^{3}/s), with a maximum of 50,000 cu ft/s (1,400 m^{3}/s) recorded in 1993 and a minimum of 42 cu ft/s (1.2 m^{3}/s) in 1954.

The Owyhee drains a remote area of the arid plateau region immediately north of the Great Basin of Central Nevada, rising in northeastern Nevada and flowing generally northward near the north-south Oregon / Idaho border to the Snake River. Its watershed is very sparsely populated. The Owyhee River and its tributaries flow through the Owyhee Plateau, cutting deep canyons, often with vertical walls and in some places over 1,000 feet (300 m) deep.

== History of the name ==
The watershed of the river was part of region inhabited by the Shoshone and Bannock indigenous Native Americans / Indians. The name of the river is from the older spelling of "Hawaii". It was named for three Native Hawaiian trappers (from the then little-known far-off Hawaiian Islands chain in the middle of the Pacific Ocean). They were in the employ of the old North West Company (1779–1821). The North West Company was headquartered north of the Great Lakes and along the St. Lawrence River at Montreal, Quebec (then the province of Lower Canada in British North America, today is the modern Dominion of Canada), who were sent to explore the uncharted river in the Rocky Mountains wilderness of the Pacific Northwest region and far western North America continent. They failed to return to the rendezvous camp near the Boise River and were never seen again. Due to this the river and its region were subsequently named "Owyhee".

About one-third of the men with Donald MacKenzie's Snake Country Expeditions of 1819–1820 were Hawaiians, commonly called "Kanakas" or "Sandwich Islanders" in those days, with "Owyhee" being a standard period spelling of the proper Hawaiian language name for the islands, hawai'i, which then was otherwise unused in English. The three Kanakas were detached to trap on the river in 1819 and were probably killed by Native Americans that year. It was not until the spring or early summer of 1820 that MacKenzie learned the news of their deaths (probably at the hands of men belonging to a band of Bannocks led by a chief named The Horse). Native Americans led other trappers to the site, but only one skeleton was located. The earliest surviving record of the name is found on a map dating to 1825, drawn by William Kittson (who was previously with MacKenzie in 1819–1820, and then with Peter Skene Ogden (1790–1854), in 1825), on which he notes "Owhyhee River" (his spelling). Journal entries in 1826 by Peter Skene Ogden, a fur trapper who led subsequent Snake Country Expeditions for the Hudson's Bay Company refer to the river primarily as the "Sandwich Island River", but also as "S. I. River", "River Owyhee", and "Owyhee River".

== History ==
=== Mining ===
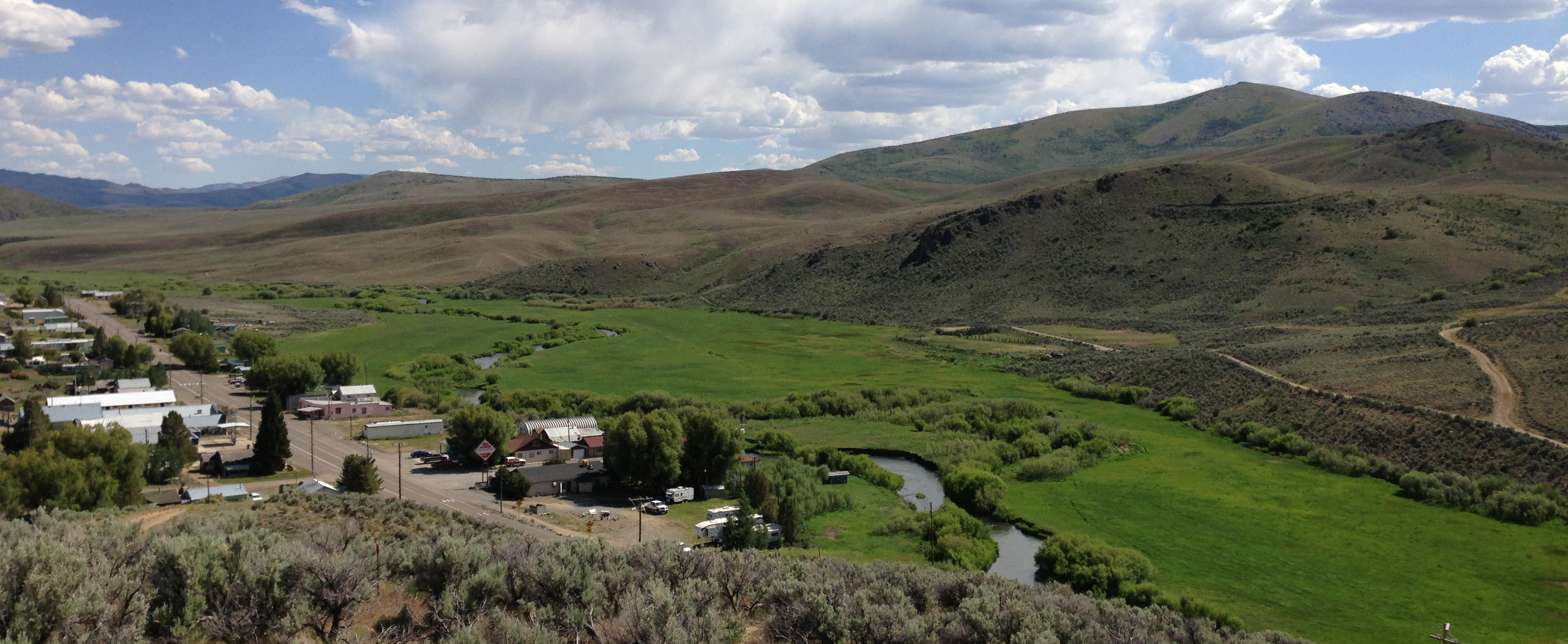
Owyhee River through Mountain City, Nevada

The discovery of gold and silver deposits in the region in 1863 resulted in a usual "rush" of a temporary influx of prospectors / miners and the establishment of mining camps and ramshackle towns, most of which have long since decayed into ruins or disappeared. The initial discovery was along Jordan Creek, and mining activity rapidly spread through the Owyhee watershed in the 1860s. This activity involved not only placer operations, but also the digging of underground mine shafts and mills, resulting in a prolonged history of 19th century mining in the region.

=== Death of Jean Baptiste Charbonneau ===
On May 16, 1866, the Indian Lemhi Shoshone-French son of Sacagawea, Jean Baptiste Charbonneau (1805–1866), died on May 16, 1866, at age 61 years old, near Jordan Creek / Owyhee River and Jordan Valley. He died after catching a "chill" or pneumonia upon crossing the Owyhee River en route from California to new gold field strikes in the old Montana Territory near the Owyhee River and Jordan Creek.

After almost a century of neglect, his grave is now well-marked, off the highway of U.S. Route 95 (see U.S. Route 95 in Oregon), near Danner, Oregon at 42°57′07.1″N 117°20′21.4″W, at Jordan Valley.

== Course ==
The source of the Owyhee River is in northeastern Nevada, in northern Elko County, approximately 50 miles (80 km) north of the county seat / town of Elko. It flows north along the east side of the Independence Mountains of Nevada, passing through Wild Horse Reservoir and then cutting northeast past the north end of the range. The river runs through the Humboldt-Toiyabe National Forest, and then past the communities of Mountain City and Owyhee in the Duck Valley Indian Reservation of Nevada. It then enters southwestern Idaho, flowing northwest for approximately 50 miles (80 km) across the southwest corner of the state through Owyhee County. It is then joined by the South Fork Owyhee River from the south, approximately 10 miles (16 km) east of the Oregon border. The main tributary of the South Fork is the Little Owyhee River.

The Owyhee River then enters extreme southeast corner of Oregon in southern Malheur County, generally flowing north in a zigzag course west of the north-south Oregon / Idaho state border. It merges with the West Little Owyhee River from the south, then receives the Middle Fork Owyhee River and North Fork Owyhee River from the east at a location known as "Three Forks." It then passes through the Owyhee Canyon between Big Grassy Mountain and Whitehouse Butte, then turns north, flowing east of Burns Junction and then west of Mahogany Mountain. In this area the Owyhee River receives the tributaries of Jordan Creek, Rattlesnake Creek, and Crooked Creek.

The Owyhee River enters the Snake River from the west on the Oregon–Idaho border approximately 5 miles (8 km) south of Nyssa, Oregon, and 2 miles (3 km) south of the mouth of the Boise River. The final stretch of the river, below Owyhee Dam, emerges from the Owyhee Plateau and enters the Snake River Plain.

=== River modifications ===
In northern Malheur County, approximately 20 miles (32 km) upstream from its mouth on the Snake, the Owyhee River is impounded by the Owyhee Dam, creating the serpentine Lake Owyhee, approximately 52 miles (84 km) long. The dam was constructed by the U.S. Bureau of Reclamation (part of the United States Department of the Interior), primarily to provide irrigation for the agricultural region in southeast Oregon and southwest Idaho. Onions and hops are the staple crops in this region. Lake Owyhee State Park and scenic Leslie Gulch are along the eastern shore of the reservoir. Owyhee Dam was built in 1933 and eliminated anadromous fish such as spawning salmon from the Owyhee River basin.

== Protected areas ==
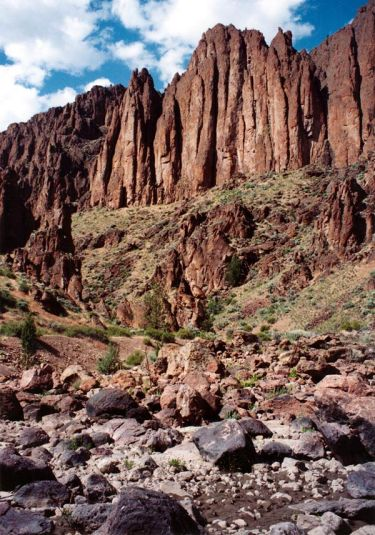
The Owyhee Canyon

In 1984, the United States Congress designated 120 miles (190 km) of the river as Owyhee Wild and Scenic River under the Wild and Scenic Rivers Act of 1968 to preserve the river in its free-flowing condition. Part of the designation includes the section of the river downstream from the Owyhee Dam, where the river flows through a remote section of deeply incised canyons surrounded by high canyon rims that are habitat for mountain lion, bobcat, mule deer, California bighorn sheep, and a large variety of raptors.

The Omnibus Public Land Management Act of 2009 designated 323,274 acres (130,824 ha) on and around the Owyhee River in Idaho as wilderness. The bill was signed into law by 44th President Barack Obama, two months after his inauguration on March 30, 2009. The new wilderness areas are:

- North Fork Owyhee Wilderness – 43,413 acres (17,569 ha)
- Owyhee River Wilderness – 267,328 acres (108,184 ha)
- Pole Creek Wilderness – 12,533 acres (5,072 ha)

The two United States Senators representing Oregon in the U.S. Senate (upper chamber of the Congress) at the United States Capitol in the federal national capital city of far to the east of Washington, D.C., Ron Wyden and Jeff Merkley (both Democrats), introduced the Owyhee Act in November 2019. It would preserve 1 million acres (400 thousand hectares) of Owyhee canyonlands as wilderness, while calling for improvements to loop roads to bring in visitors. It also designated 14.7 miles (23.7 km) of the river for protection under the Wild and Scenic Rivers Act. It was supported by both ranchers and conservationists, as well as the Northwest Sport Fishing Association. With the bill stalled for several years, governor Tina Kotek and other advocates called for President Biden to make the area a national monument in August 2024.

== Tributaries ==
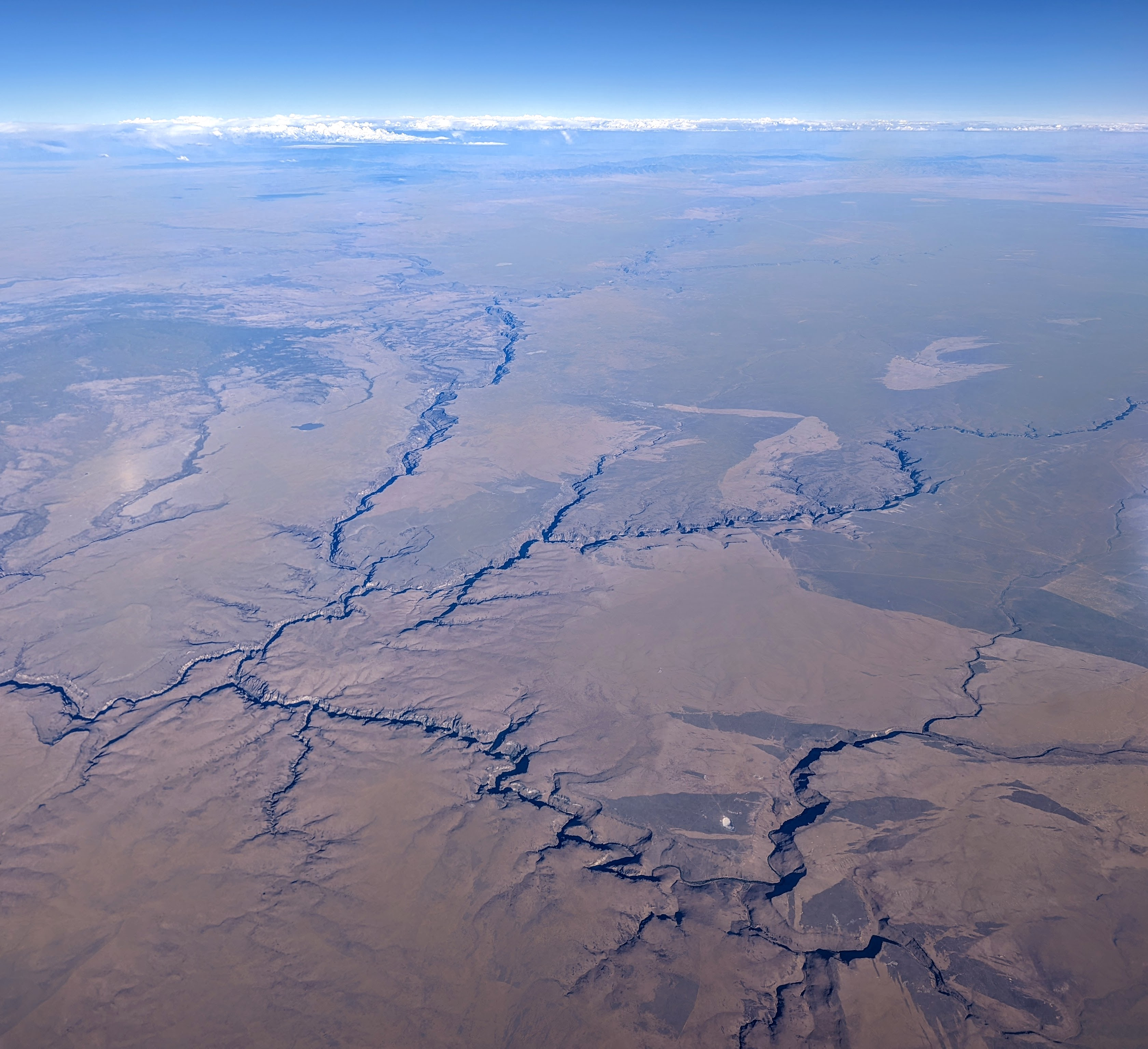
Aerial view of the Owyhee River in Oregon, and looking southeast into Idaho, with the Three Forks Recreation Site at left

- Jordan Creek is a 99-mile (159 km) tributary. It flows generally west from near Silver City, Idaho, in the Owyhee Mountains to near Rome in the Oregon High Desert.
- The West Little Owyhee River has a source at an elevation of 6,508 feet (1,984 m) near the Nevada-Oregon border by the community of McDermitt, Nevada. Approximately 57 miles (92 km) in length, the river flows east by Deer Flat and into Louse Canyon. Near a prominent feature known as Twin Buttes, it turns sharply north as it cuts through the Owyhee Desert, making its way to the Owyhee River.
- The Lake Fork West Owyhee River is a short tributary of the West Little Owyhee River that begins near the Cat, Bend, and Pedroli springs near the eastern boundary of the Fort McDermitt Indian Reservation (for the Paiute and Shoshone native tribes) near the old U.S. Army cavalry post of Fort McDermitt (1865 / 1866–1889), in southern Malheur County, Oregon. It flows generally northeast to meet the larger river in Louse Canyon. The Lake Fork has no named tributaries.
- The Little Owyhee River is a 61-mile (98 km) long tributary of the South Fork Owyhee River. Beginning at an elevation of 6,739 feet (2,054 m) east of the Santa Rosa Range in eastern Humboldt County, Nevada, it flows generally east into Elko County, Nevada and the Owyhee Desert.
- Blue Creek is a 53-mile (85 km) long tributary that begins at an elevation of 6,097 feet (1,858 m) in central Owyhee County, it flows generally south through the Owyhee Desert and near the community of Riddle, where it is roughly paralleled by Idaho State Highway 51. It then flows into the Duck Valley Indian Reservation to its mouth near the east-west Idaho/Nevada state border, northwest of Owyhee, Nevada, at an elevation of 5,289 feet (1,612 m).

== See also ==
- List of Idaho rivers
- List of longest streams of Idaho
- List of longest streams of Oregon
- List of National Wild and Scenic Rivers
- List of Nevada rivers
- List of rivers of Oregon
- Owyhee
