= Owyhee Mountains =

Mountain range in Idaho and Oregon, USA

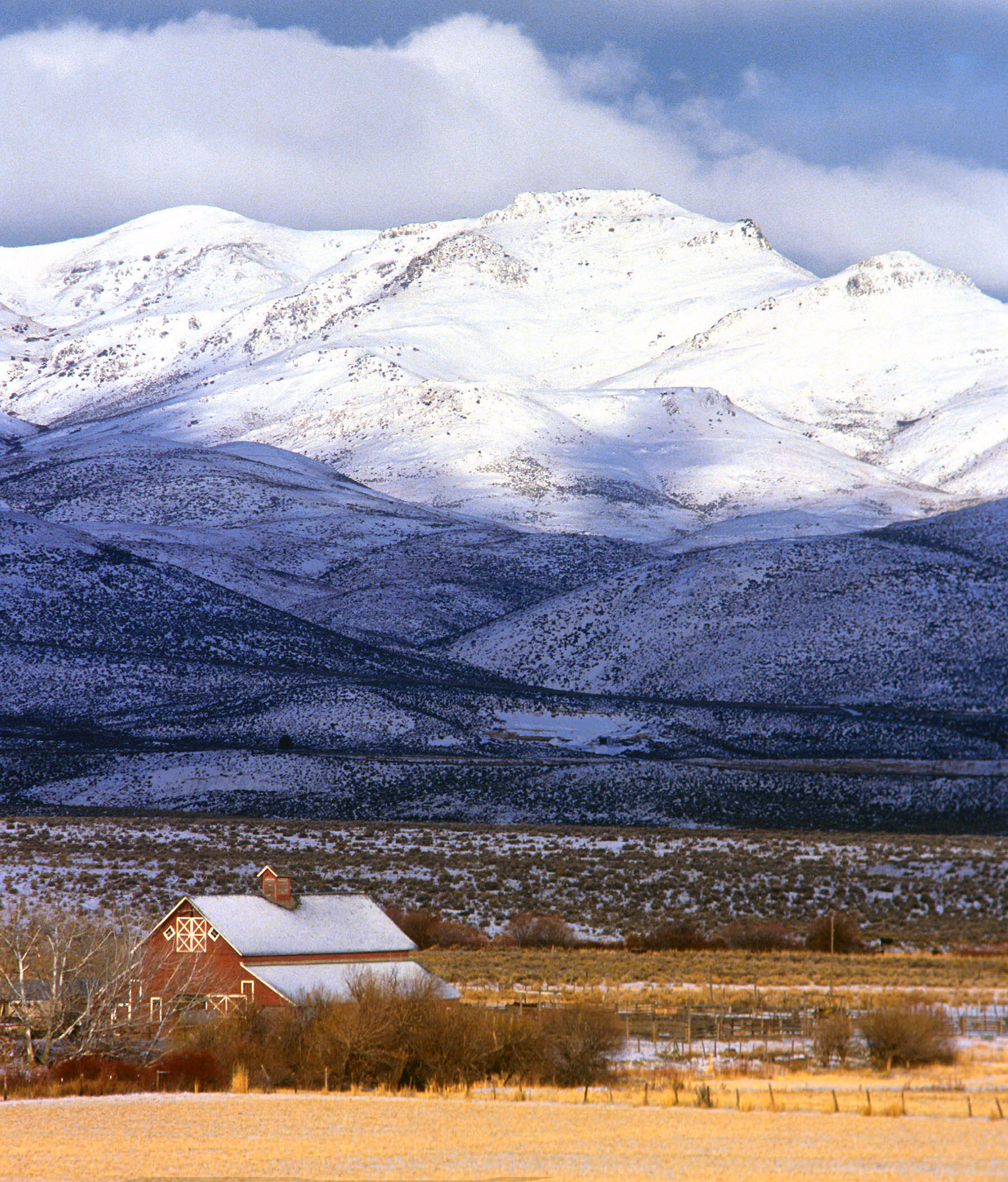
- Owyhee Mountains and Noble Horse Barn viewed from the east

Highest point
- Peak: Hayden Peak, Owyhee County, Idaho
- Elevation: 8,402 ft (2,561 m)

Dimensions
- Length: 40 mi (64 km) NNW-SSE

Geography
- Location within the United States Location within Idaho
- Country: United States
- State(s): Idaho and Oregon
- District(s): Owyhee County, Idaho and Malheur County, Oregon
- Range coordinates: 42°58′51″N 116°39′31″W
- Parent range: Owyhee Mountain Range
- Topo map: USGS Cinnabar Mountain

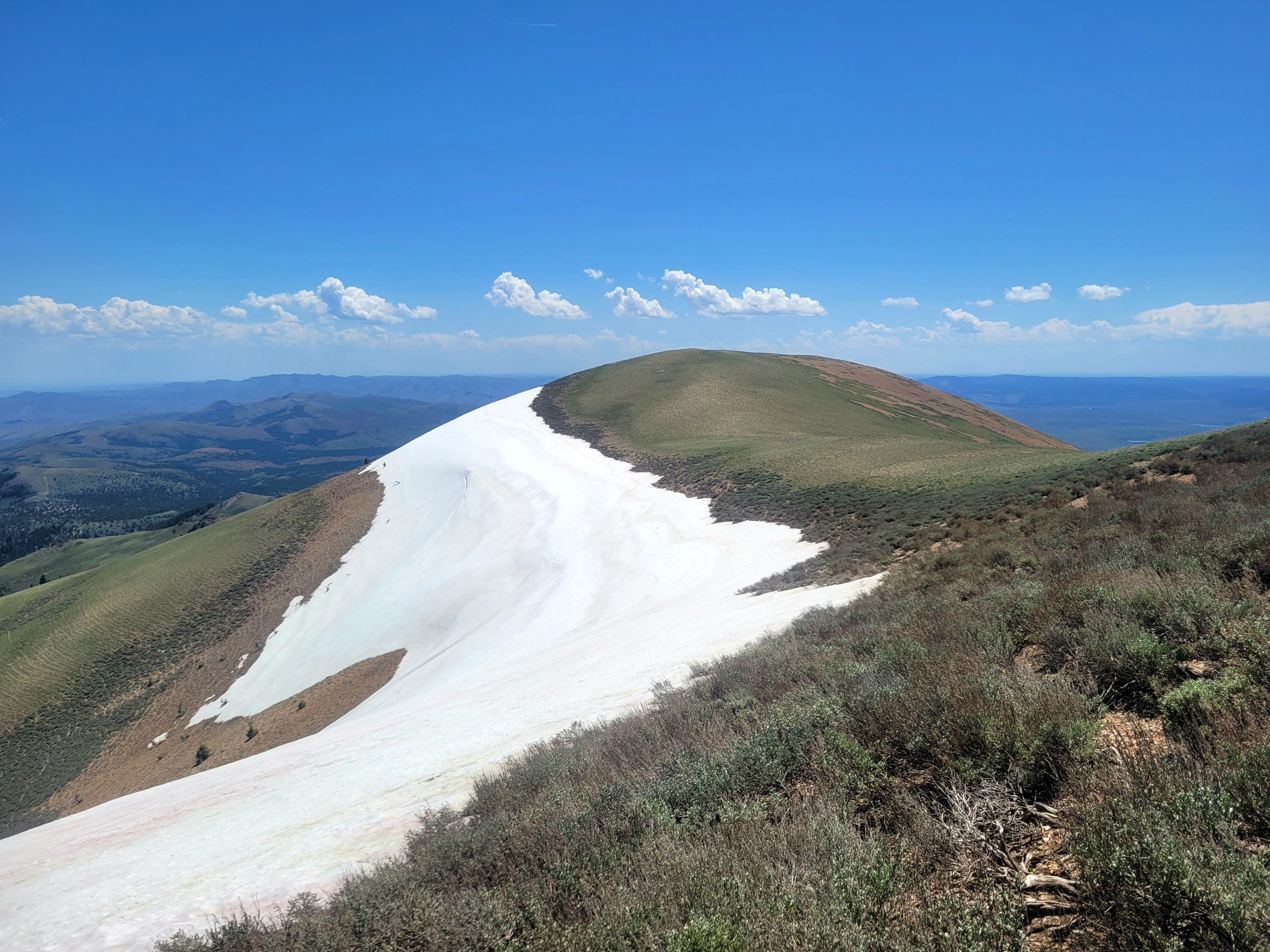
The southern tip Quicksilver Mountain viewed from the main peak.

The Owyhee Mountains are a mountain range in the western United States, located in Owyhee County, Idaho, and Malheur County, Oregon.

Mahogany Mountain and the associated volcanic craters of the Lake Owyhee volcanic field are in the Owyhee Mountains of Oregon just east of the Owyhee Reservoir on the Owyhee River.

The southeastern end of the range in Idaho, including the old mining area west of Silver City, is referred to as the Silver City Range. About five miles (8 km) west of Silver City is the De Lamar ghost town in Jordan Creek below the mine workings on De Lamar Mountain to the south. The area was active in the late 1880s. In the 1970s, mining began again with the development of open pit silver–gold mines on De Lamar Mountain.
