= Jordan Creek (Owyhee River tributary) =

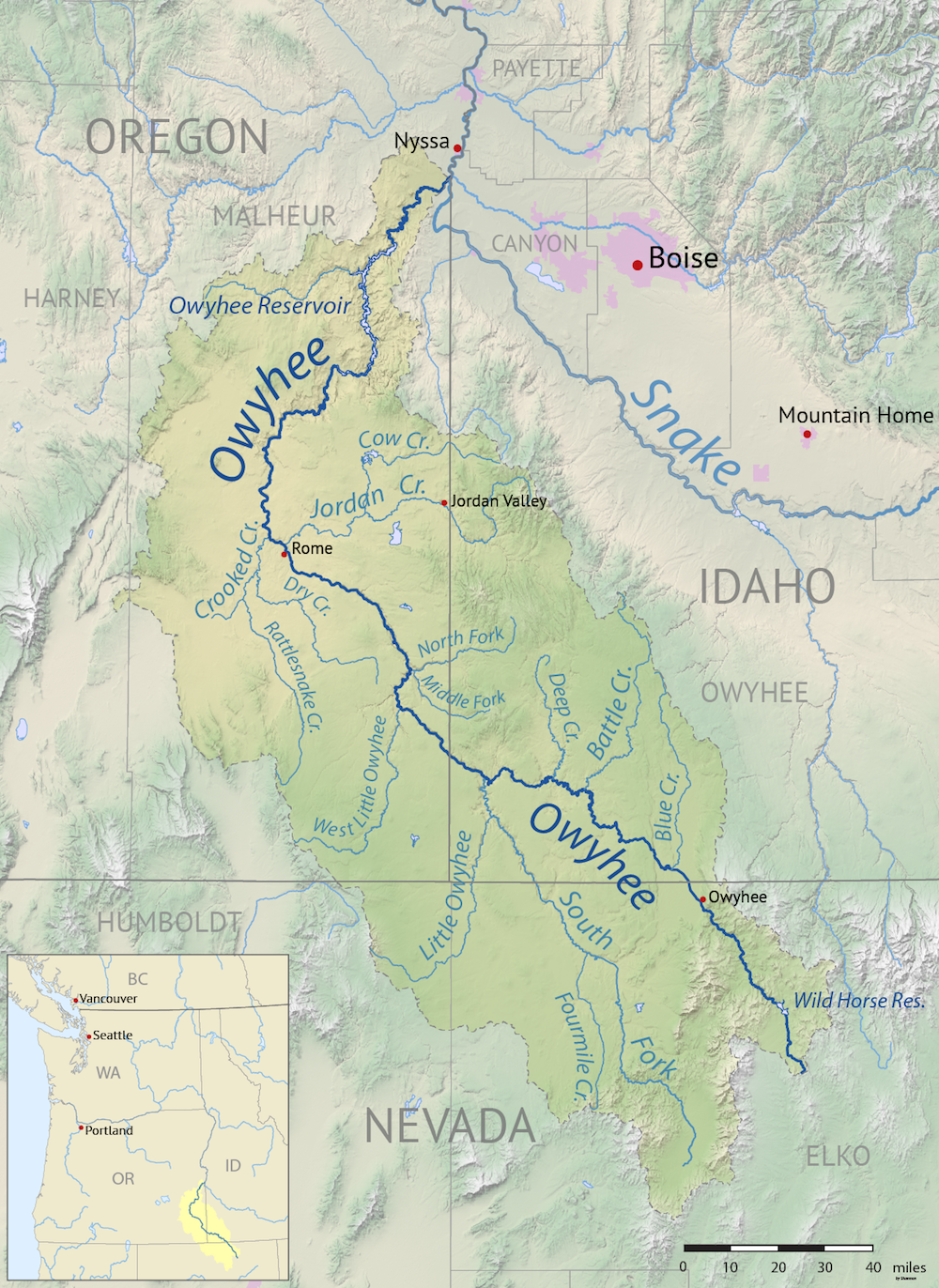
- Map of the Owyhee River drainage basin; Jordan Creek joins the river near Rome, Oregon

- Location of the mouth of Jordan Creek in Oregon Jordan Creek (Owyhee River tributary) (the United States)
- Etymology: For Michael M. Jordan, whose party discovered gold along the creek in 1863

Location
- Country: United States
- State: Idaho, Oregon

Physical characteristics
- Source: Owyhee Mountains
  - location: near Silver City, Owyhee County, Idaho
  - coordinates: 42°58′21″N 116°44′39″W
  - elevation: 7,551 ft (2,302 m)
- Mouth: Owyhee River
  - location: near Rome, Malheur County, Oregon
  - coordinates: 42°51′45″N 117°38′29″W
  - elevation: 3,363 ft (1,025 m)
- Length: 99 mi (159 km)
- Basin size: 1,305 sq mi (3,380 km^{2})
- Discharge
  - location: near Oregon–Idaho border
  - average: 183 cu ft/s (5.2 m^{3}/s)
  - minimum: 1.2 cu ft/s (0.034 m^{3}/s)
  - maximum: 7,530 cu ft/s (213 m^{3}/s)

Jordan Creek is a 99-mile (159 km) tributary of the Owyhee River in the northwestern United States. It generally flows west from near Silver City, Idaho, in the Owyhee Mountains to near Rome in the Oregon High Desert. Major tributaries are Big Boulder, Soda, Louse, Spring, Rock, Meadow, Combination, and Louisa creeks in Idaho and Cow Creek in Oregon. The creek is named for Michael M. Jordan, who led a party that discovered gold along the creek in 1863.

== Watershed ==
Jordan Creek's watershed of 1,305 square miles (3,380 km^{2}) is almost evenly divided between the two states, 46 percent in Idaho and 54 percent in Oregon. Although the upper parts of the basin in the Silver City Mountain Range supported mining camps and towns in the late 19th century through the early 20th century, they were generally abandoned when the gold and silver played out. Much of the population in the 21st century lives on small homesteads, ranches, and farms scattered throughout the watershed. Jordan Valley, Oregon, is the basin's only population center that has permanent, year-round residents, while Silver City has mostly part-time or weekend residents.

Land use in the watershed is divided among irrigated agriculture, range land, forests, mining, and riparian zones. The primary uses are cow-calf grazing in the uplands and hay production in the irrigated lowlands. Average precipitation varies from about 21 inches (53 cm) a year in the mountains of Idaho to about 11 inches (28 cm) in the plateaus of eastern Oregon. To control water flow for irrigation, most of the watershed's hydrology has been modified to some degree by large reservoirs in Oregon and in-stream diversions in Idaho.

== Discharge ==
Based on 28 years of record-keeping from 1946 to 1971 and from 2003 to 2004, the average discharge of Jordan Creek, measured about 4 miles (6 km) upstream of the Oregon–Idaho border, is 183 cubic feet per second (5.2 m^{3}/s). The lowest recorded discharge was 1.2 cubic feet per second (0.034 m^{3}/s) in September 1962, and the highest was 7,530 cubic feet per second (213 m^{3}/s) on December 31, 1965. This flow came from slightly less than 46 percent of the total watershed.

== See also ==
- List of rivers of Oregon
- List of longest streams of Oregon
- List of rivers of Idaho
- List of longest streams of Idaho

== Works cited ==
- Idaho Department of Environmental Quality (DEQ). (2009). Jordan Creek Subbasin Assessment and Total Maximum Daily Load (PDF). Retrieved September 12, 2010.
- McArthur, Lewis A., and McArthur, Lewis L. (2003) [1928]. Oregon Geographic Names, 7th ed. Portland: Oregon Historical Society Press. ISBN 0-87595-277-1.
- National Resources Conservation Service (NRCS) (2010). Jordan – 17050108, 8 Digit Hydrologic Unit Profile (PDF). Retrieved September 10, 2010.
