= De Lamar, Idaho =

- Delamar Historic District
- U.S. National Register of Historic Places
- U.S. Historic district
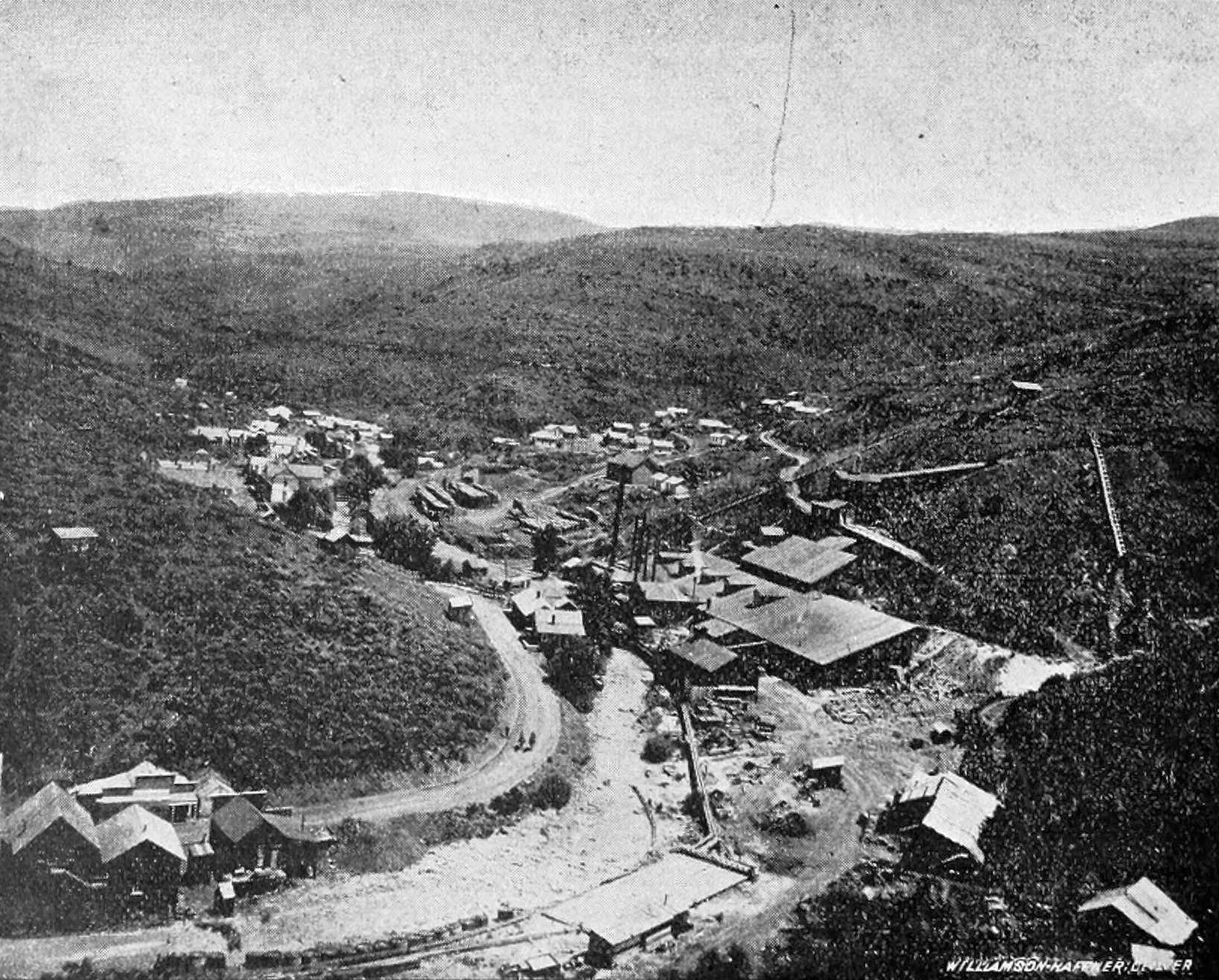
- De Lamar, 1898

- Location within Idaho Location within the United States
- Location: Owyhee County, Idaho
- Nearest city: Silver City, Idaho
- Coordinates: 43°01′28″N 116°49′53″W
- Area: 1,600 acres (650 ha)
- Built: 1889
- NRHP reference No.: 76000679
- Added to NRHP: May 13, 1976

De Lamar (also DeLamar) is a ghost town in Owyhee County, Idaho, United States. Its elevation is 5,463 ft (1,665 m), and it is approximately 6 mi (9.7 km) west of Silver City. The community lies within an area governed by the Bureau of Land Management.

The community formed around the De Lamar Mine, which was established in 1888. Named for mining magnate and former sea captain Joseph Raphael De Lamar, the mine and community quickly boomed and busted, declining after 1890. Despite the community's decline, it continued to exist as a populated community for several decades; it was the location of a summer-only post office from 1917 to 1930.

In 1976, the ghost town was listed on the National Register of Historic Places as a historic district. Although the district included an area of approximately 1,600 acres (650 ha), only four of the community's buildings remained in sufficient condition to qualify as contributing properties.
