= List of longest streams of Idaho =

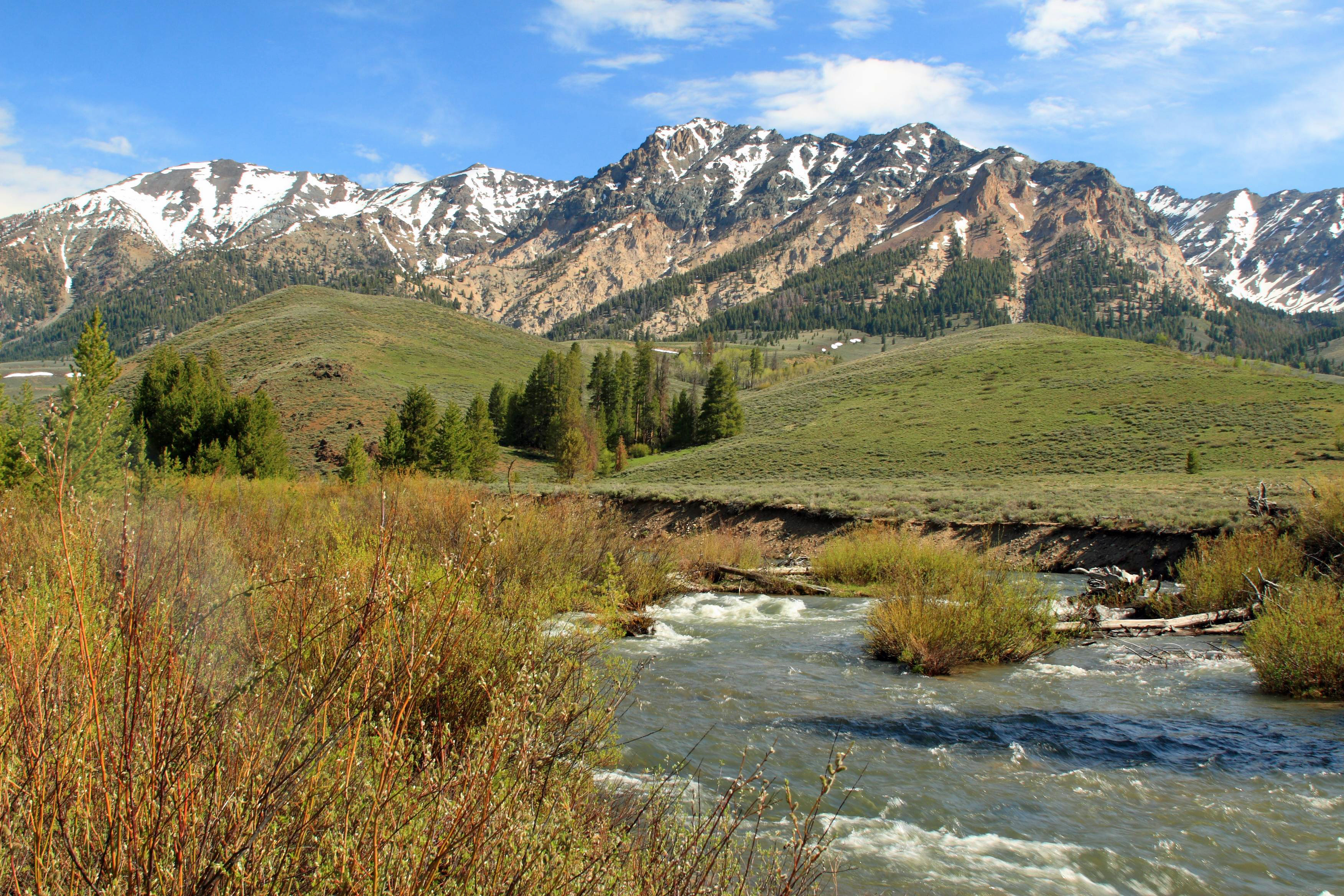
The Big Wood River (10th-longest) in the Sawtooth National Recreation Area in Blaine County

A total of seventy streams that are at least 50 miles (80 km) long flow through the U.S. state of Idaho. All of these streams originate in the United States except the Kootenai River (third-longest) and the Moyie River (thirty-first-longest), both of which begin in the Canadian province of British Columbia. At 1,076 miles (1,732 km), the Snake River is the longest and the only stream of more than 500 miles (800 km) in total length. It begins in Wyoming and flows through Idaho for 769 miles (1,238 km), and then through Oregon and Washington. Some of the other streams also cross borders between Idaho and Montana, Nevada, Oregon, Utah, Washington, or Wyoming, but the majority flow entirely within Idaho, the longest of which is the Salmon River at 425 miles (684 km).

All but four of the streams lie within the large basin of the Columbia River, although the river itself does not flow through Idaho. Consequently, the predominant direction of the state's streamflow is northwest towards the Columbia River and its mouth at the Pacific Ocean. The only other major drainage basin in Idaho is the Great Salt Lake watershed in the state's southeastern corner, which is part of the Great Basin and has no outlet to the ocean. The Bear River, the second-longest stream, is within this watershed, along with the Malad River, Deep Creek, and the Logan River.

Source data for the table below comes from topographic maps created by the United States Geological Survey and published online by TopoQuest, and on the Idaho Road and Recreation Atlas, the National Hydrography Dataset, the Geographic Names Information System, and other sources as noted. In the table, total lengths are given in miles (mi) and kilometers (km).

== Table ==
Longest streams of Idaho
Rank	Name	Mouth	Total length		Length in Idaho		Mouth coordinates	Source coordinates
Rank	Name	Mouth	mi	km	mi	km	Mouth coordinates	Source coordinates
1	Snake River	Columbia River	1,076	1,732	769	1,238	46°11′10″N 119°01′43″W	44°07′49″N 110°13′10″W
2	Bear River	Great Salt Lake	490	789	185	297	41°27′30″N 112°17′25″W	40°52′02″N 110°50′09″W
3	Kootenai River	Columbia River	485	780	65	105	49°19′00″N 117°39′04″W	51°02′21″N 116°26′33″W
4	Salmon River	Snake River	425	685	425	685	45°51′23″N 116°47′37″W	43°47′48″N 114°46′36″W
5	Owyhee River	Snake River	347	558	91	147	43°48′46″N 117°01′32″W	41°30′17″N 115°44′30″W
6	Clark Fork	Pend Oreille Lake	347	558	9	15	48°11′00″N 116°16′09″W	46°11′12″N 112°46′18″W
7	Palouse River	Snake River	167	268	43	70	46°35′24″N 118°12′55″W	46°58′07″N 116°27′32″W
8	Bruneau River	Snake River	153	246	94	152	42°56′57″N 115°57′43″W	41°34′42″N 115°24′50″W
9	Saint Joe River	Coeur d'Alene Lake	140	225	140	225	47°23′35″N 116°45′15″W	47°01′07″N 115°04′58″W
10	Big Wood River	Malad River	137	221	137	221	42°56′42″N 114°47′44″W	43°51′38″N 114°42′48″W
11	Big Lost River	Big Lost River Sinks	135	217	135	217	43°47′39″N 112°50′26″W	43°56′01″N 114°06′38″W
12	Blackfoot River	Snake River	135	217	135	217	43°07′38″N 112°30′22″W	42°50′22″N 111°18′32″W
13	North Fork Clearwater River	Clearwater River	135	217	135	217	46°30′00″N 116°19′50″W	47°00′11″N 115°06′16″W
14	Little Wood River	Malad River	130	209	130	209	42°56′42″N 114°47′46″W	43°45′41″N 114°00′13″W
15	Henrys Fork	Snake River	127	204	127	204	43°45′10″N 111°57′28″W	44°29′34″N 111°16′58″W
16	South Fork Owyhee River	Owyhee River	127	204	33	53	42°15′55″N 116°53′17″W	41°13′40″N 116°09′39″W
17	Portneuf River	Snake River	124	200	124	200	42°57′06″N 112°45′02″W	43°06′10″N 112°00′13″W
18	Goose Creek	Snake River	123	197 (Note: Approximation; Goose Creek's course is largely obliterated by agriculture past Lower Goose Creek Reservoir.)	75	120	42°32′37″N 113°45′47″W	42°10′29″N 114°17′31″W
19	Salmon Falls Creek	Snake River	121	195	73	117	42°42′55″N 114°51′12″W	41°47′22″N 114°57′43″W
20	Pend Oreille River	Columbia River	118	190	32	52	49°00′14″N 117°37′04″W	48°15′30″N 116°32′04″W
21	Spokane River	Columbia River	114	183	15	24	47°53′38″N 118°20′03″W	47°40′41″N 117°07′34″W
22	Raft River	Snake River	109	175	98	158	42°36′20″N 113°14′26″W	41°56′34″N 113°43′37″W
23	Middle Fork Salmon River	Salmon River	106	170	106	170	45°17′50″N 114°35′36″W	44°26′57″N 115°13′51″W
24	North Fork Payette River	Payette River	106	170	106	170	44°05′06″N 116°06′57″W	45°10′47″N 115°59′37″W
25	Weiser River	Snake River	103	166	103	166	44°14′19″N 116°58′20″W	45°01′13″N 116°26′05″W
26	Boise River	Snake River	102	164	102	164	43°49′15″N 117°01′34″W	43°42′48″N 115°38′09″W
27	South Fork Boise River	Boise River	102	164	102	164	43°36′06″N 115°51′25″W	43°46′25″N 114°55′45″W
28	Selway River	Middle Fork Clearwater River	100	161	100	161	46°08′25″N 115°35′58″W	45°29′49″N 114°44′37″W
29	Jordan Creek	Owyhee River	99	159	42	67	42°51′45″N 117°38′29″W	42°58′21″N 116°44′39″W
30	Malad River	Bear River	97	156	36	58	41°35′10″N 112°07′03″W	42°13′18″N 112°21′54″W Note: Incomplete record. Source coordinates derived from Big Malad Spring.
31	Moyie River	Kootenai River	92	147	26	42	48°42′56″N 115°11′11″W	49°17′00″N 116°09′00″W
32	South Fork Salmon River	Salmon River	90	145	90	145	45°22′40″N 115°30′47″W	44°28′47″N 115°41′06″W
33	Willow Creek	Snake River	84	136 (Note: Approximation; Willow Creek's course is largely obliterated by agriculture past Ririe.)	84	136	43°33′10″N 111°59′17″W	43°05′40″N 111°42′52″W
34	Salt River	Snake River	84	136	2	4 (Note: All of the Salt River's length within Idaho is submerged by Palisades Reservoir.)	43°10′02″N 111°03′52″W	42°35′38″N 110°48′08″W
35	Payette River	Snake River	83	133	83	133	44°05′32″N 116°57′09″W	44°05′04″N 116°06′54″W
36	Teton River	Henrys Fork	81	131	81	131	43°53′56″N 111°50′21″W	43°36′38″N 111°09′16″W
37	South Fork Payette River	Payette River	80	129	80	129	44°05′04″N 116°06′54″W	43°57′51″N 115°00′02″W
38	Hangman Creek	Spokane River	79	127	21	33	47°39′36″N 117°27′28″W	47°06′53″N 116°43′00″W
39	North Fork Coeur d'Alene River	Coeur d'Alene River	77	124	77	124	47°33′26″N 116°15′22″W	48°00′03″N 116°18′27″W
40	Clearwater River	Snake River	75	120	75	120	46°25′30″N 117°02′14″W	46°08′45″N 115°58′57″W
41	Deep Creek	Great Salt Lake	73	118	35	57	41°41′42″N 113°00′26″W	42°21′40″N 112°35′41″W
42	Union Flat Creek	Palouse River	72	115	5	7	46°49′38″N 117°59′55″W	46°31′20″N 116°57′35″W
43	Succor Creek	Snake River	71	114	30	48	43°37′55″N 116°56′47″W	43°05′45″N 116°50′18″W
44	Lochsa River	Middle Fork Clearwater River	69	111	69	111	46°08′25″N 115°35′58″W	46°30′30″N 114°40′54″W
45	Priest River	Pend Oreille River	68	110 (Note: Length includes Priest Lake. The Priest River is 47 mi (76 km) long not including Priest Lake.)	68	110	48°10′37″N 116°53′34″W	48°45′58″N 116°51′52″W
46	Battle Creek	Owyhee River	67	108	67	108	42°14′14″N 116°31′29″W	42°44′32″N 116°24′16″W
47	Bannock Creek	Snake River	67	107	67	107	42°53′14″N 112°41′02″W	42°22′56″N 112°38′36″W
48	Indian Creek	Boise River	66	107	66	107	43°40′39″N 116°42′19″W	43°25′53″N 115°46′49″W
49	Sailor Creek	Snake River	64	104	64	104	42°55′43″N 115°28′48″W	42°22′52″N 115°12′59″W
50	Fall River	Henrys Fork	64	103	33	53	44°01′07″N 111°34′52″W	44°14′51″N 110°45′43″W
51	Camas Creek	Big Wood River	64	103	64	103	43°19′36″N 114°24′06″W	43°15′28″N 115°20′57″W
52	Camas Creek	Mud Lake	63	102	63	102	43°53′24″N 112°21′32″W	44°21′52″N 111°53′36″W
53	South Fork Clearwater River	Clearwater River	63	101	63	101	46°08′45″N 115°58′57″W	45°48′30″N 115°28′29″W
54	Sheep Creek	Bruneau River	63	101	61	97	42°29′55″N 115°35′50″W	41°58′18″N 115°55′07″W
55	Chief Eagle Eye Creek	Payette River	61	98	61	98	43°56′16″N 116°22′01″W	44°26′10″N 116°09′09″W
56	Little Owyhee River	South Fork Owyhee River	61	97	16	26	42°10′03″N 116°52′19″W	41°48′30″N 117°17′03″W
57	Lemhi River	Salmon River	60	97	60	97	45°11′17″N 113°54′23″W	44°40′56″N 113°21′17″W
58	Pahsimeroi River	Salmon River	59	95	59	95	44°41′31″N 114°02′55″W	44°09′25″N 113°42′15″W
59	Beaver Creek	Camas Creek	58	94	58	94	43°59′21″N 112°14′19″W	44°30′23″N 112°21′26″W
60	Big Jacks Creek	Jacks Creek	58	93	58	93	42°47′12″N 115°58′41″W	42°22′56″N 116°06′29″W
61	Potlatch River	Clearwater River	57	92	57	92	46°28′31″N 116°46′02″W	46°55′43″N 116°20′55″W
62	Marsh Creek	Portneuf River	56	90	56	90	42°47′40″N 112°15′28″W	42°24′12″N 112°01′37″W
63	Clover Creek	Bruneau River	55	89	55	89	42°34′35″N 115°38′07″W	42°09′28″N 115°12′43″W
64	Logan River	Little Bear River	54	86	3	5	41°44′29″N 111°57′17″W	42°02′07″N 111°35′58″W
65	Blue Creek	Owyhee River	53	85	53	85	42°01′48″N 116°12′37″W	42°32′05″N 116°16′04″W
66	Middle Fork Boise River	Boise River	52	84	52	84	43°42′48″N 115°38′08″W	43°56′47″N 115°01′56″W
67	Little Salmon River	Salmon River	52	84	52	84	45°25′00″N 116°18′53″W	44°50′28″N 116°15′46″W
68	Jarbidge River	Bruneau River	52	83	34	54	42°19′45″N 115°39′09″W	41°46′47″N 115°22′37″W
69	Cow Creek	Jordan Creek	51	82	13	20	42°56′51″N 117°20′38″W	43°04′23″N 116°50′23″W
70	North Fork Boise River	Boise River	50	81	50	81	43°42′49″N 115°38′08″W	44°05′41″N 115°13′37″W

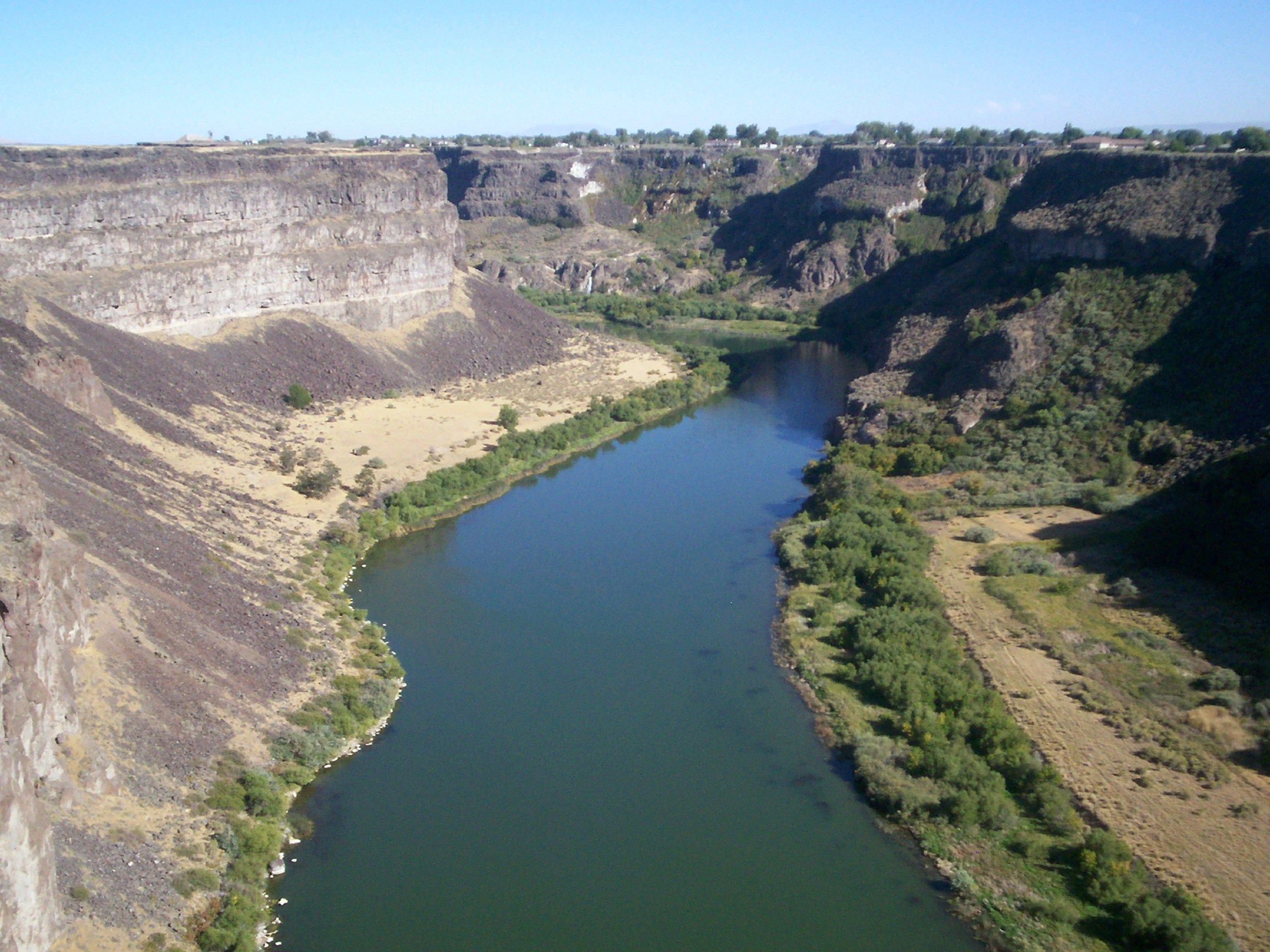
Snake River (longest) cutting through the Snake River Plain near Twin Falls

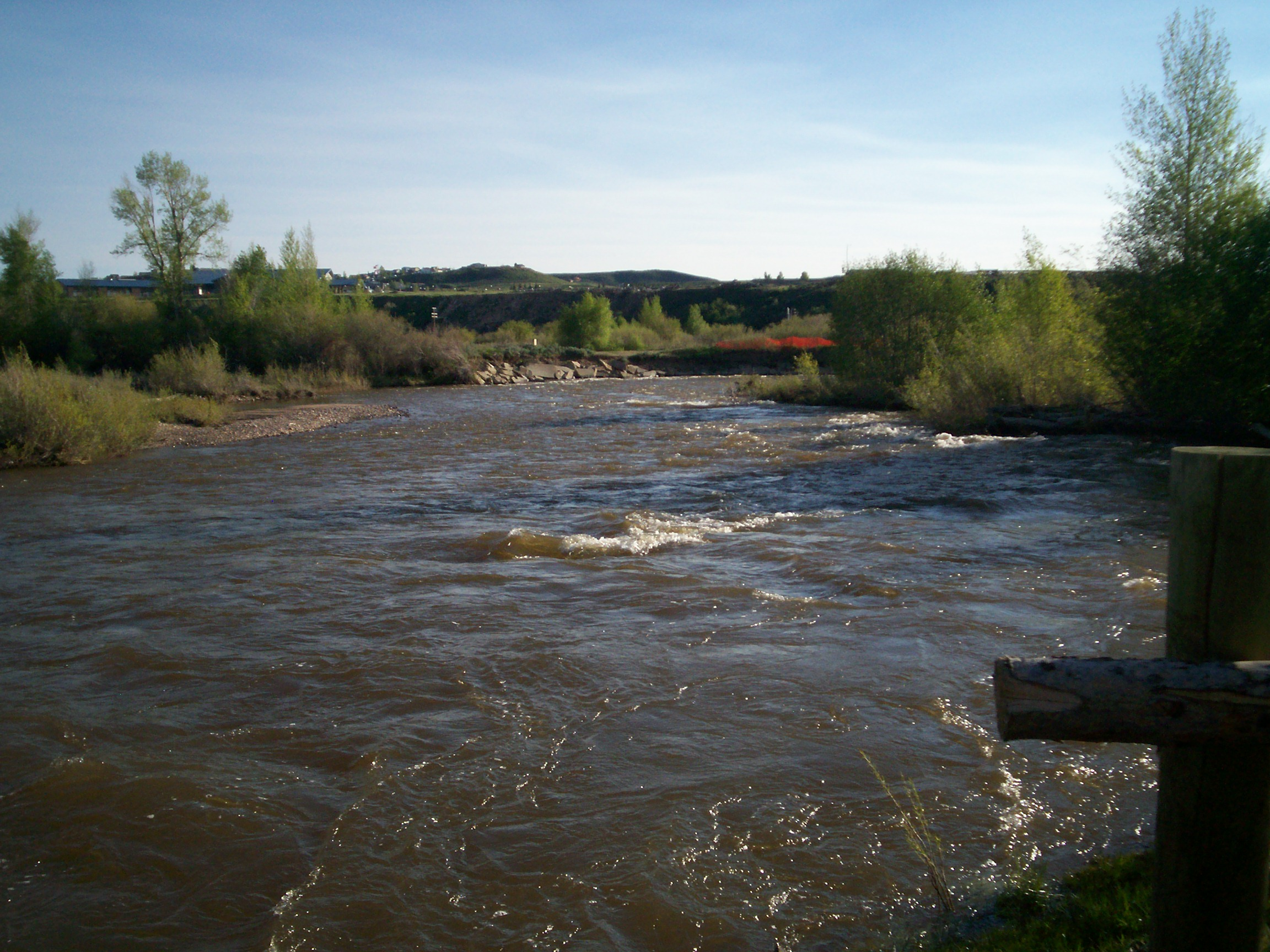
Bear River (2nd longest) in Bear River State Park, Wyoming

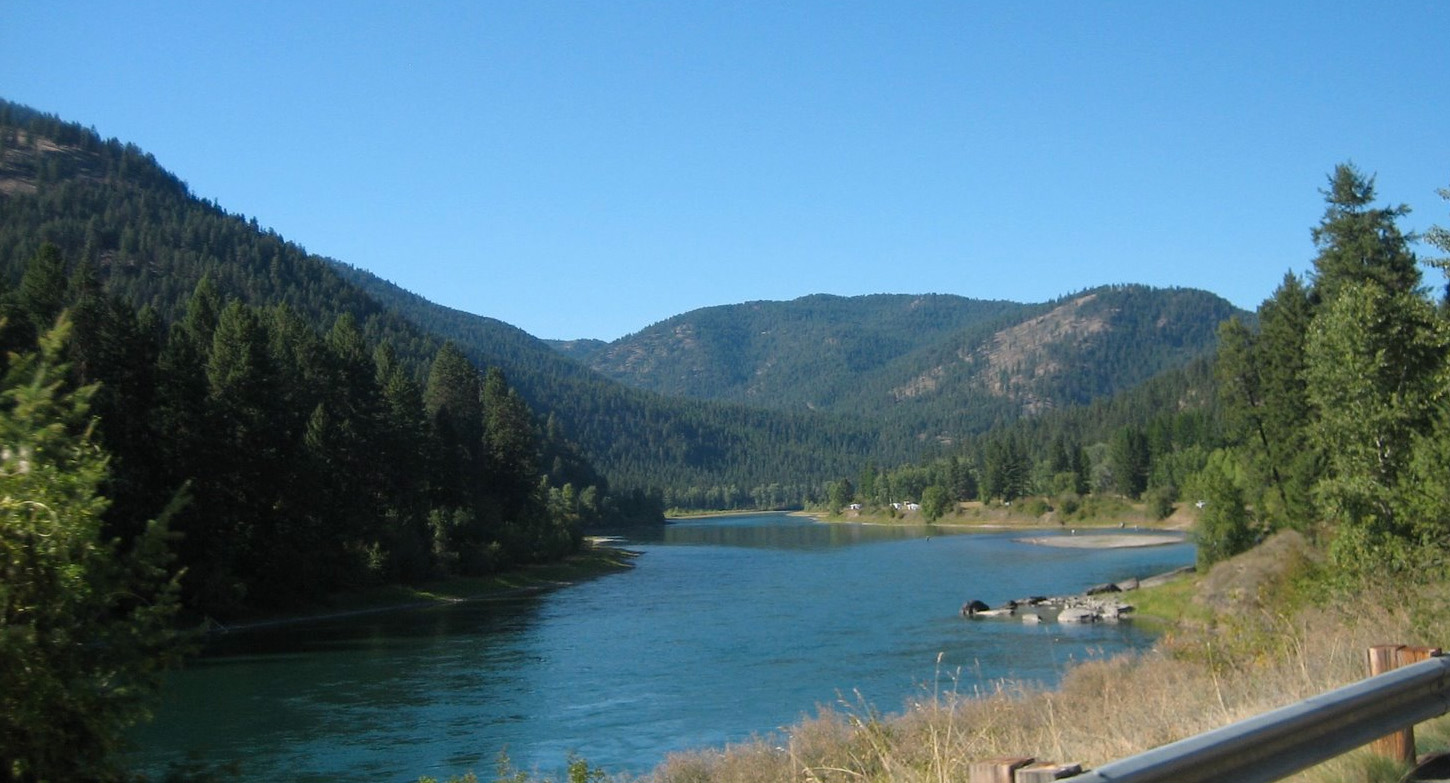
Kootenai River (3rd longest) south of Libby Dam, Montana

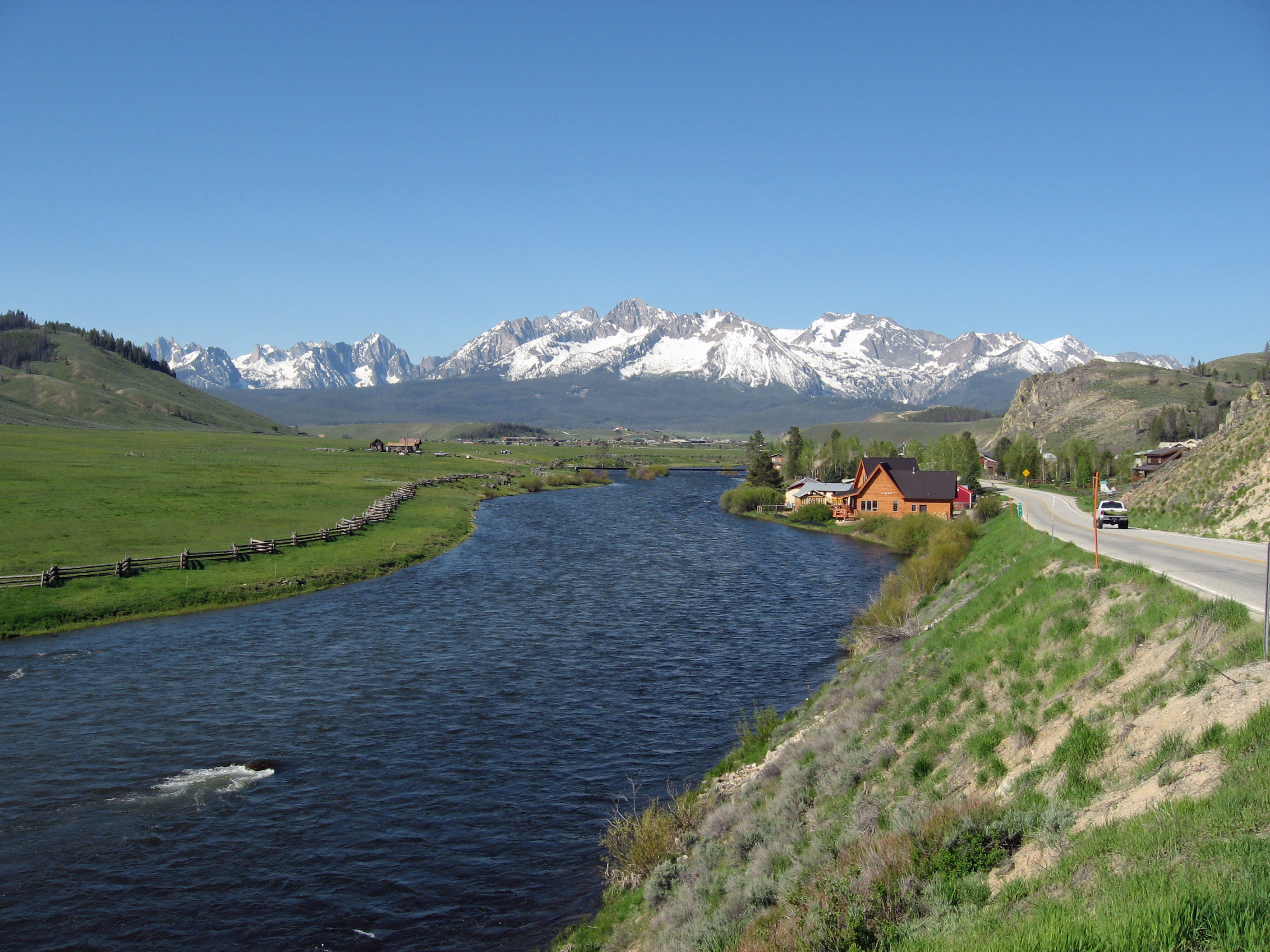
Salmon River (4th longest) below the Sawtooth Mountains

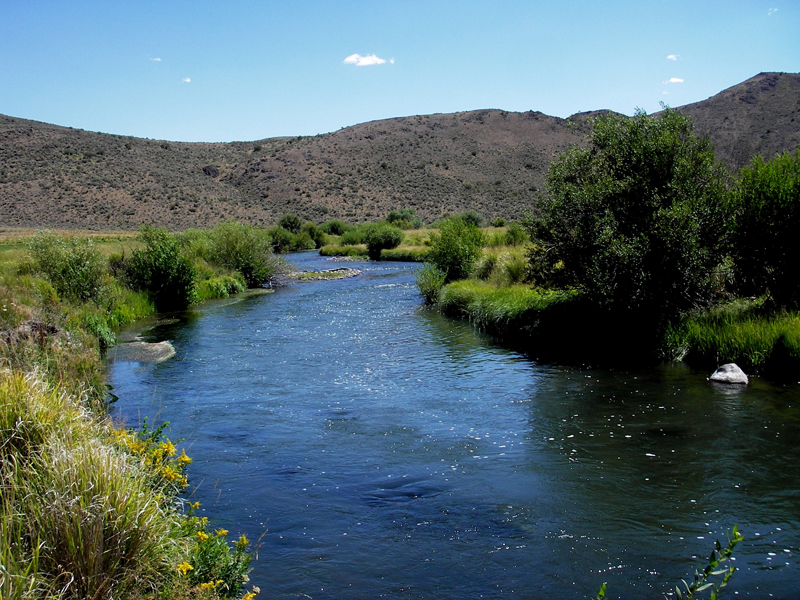
Owyhee River (5th longest) south of Mountain City, Nevada

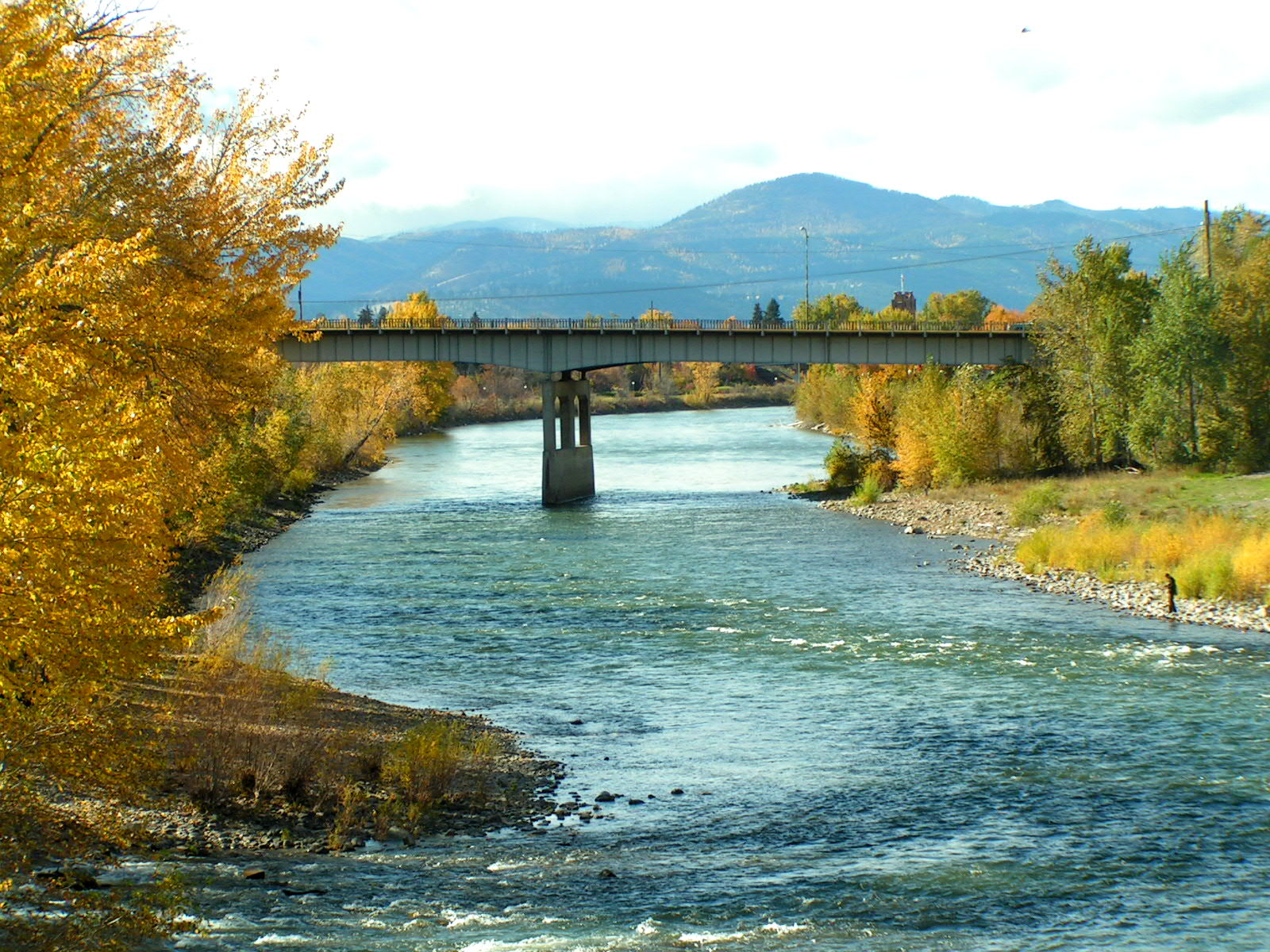
Clark Fork (6th longest) in Missoula, Montana

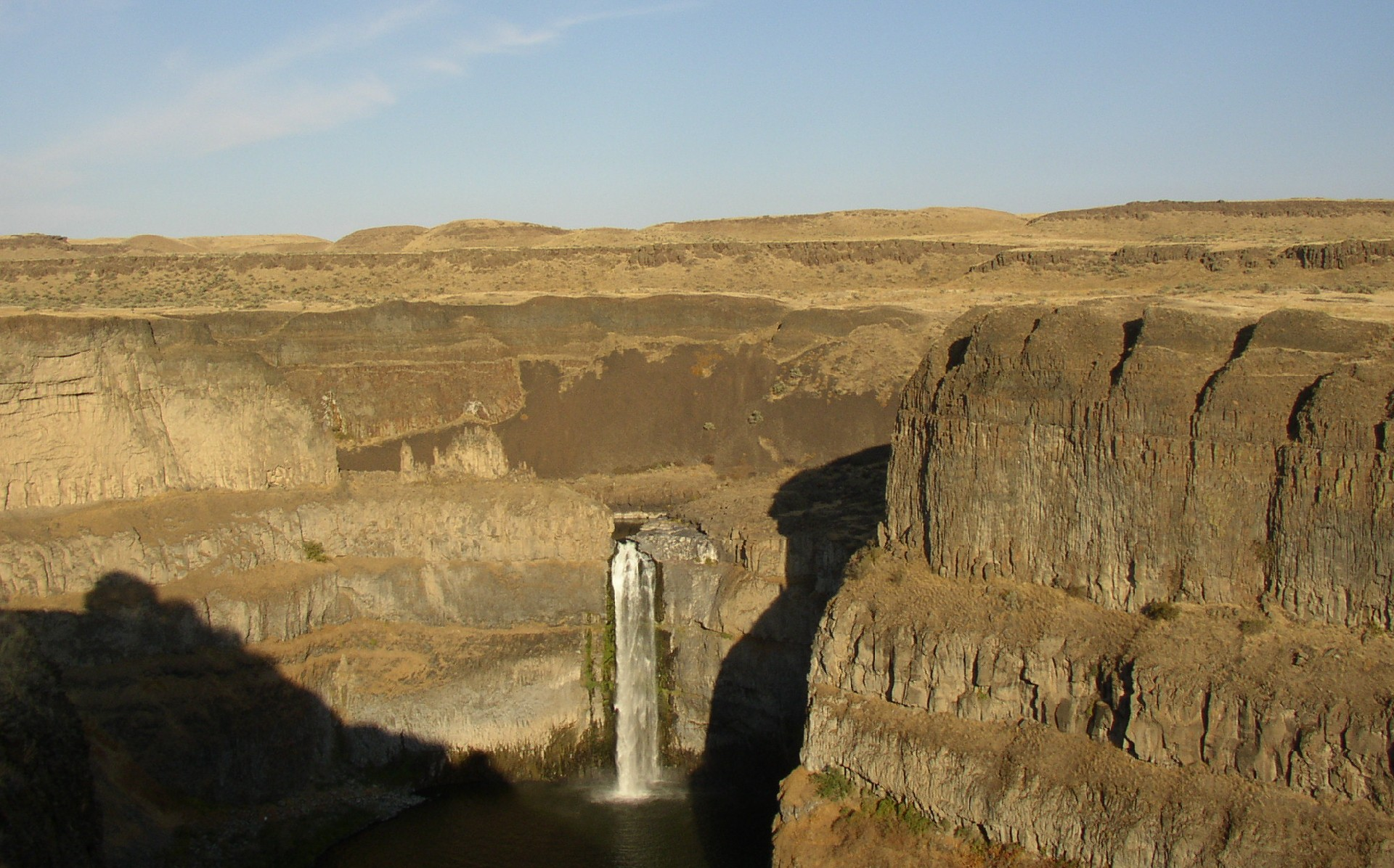
Palouse River (7th longest) flowing over Palouse Falls, Washington

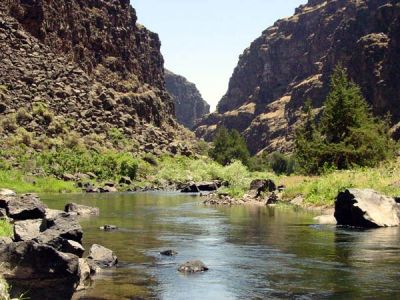
Bruneau River (8th longest) in southwestern Idaho

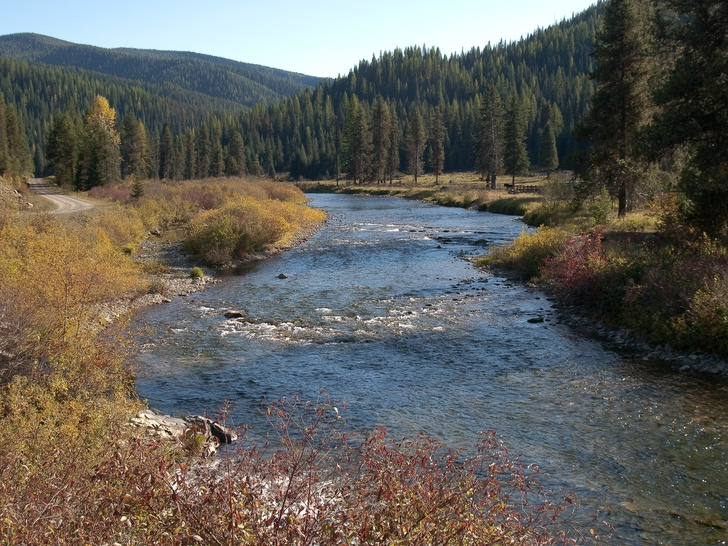
Saint Joe River (9th longest) in the Saint Joe National Forest

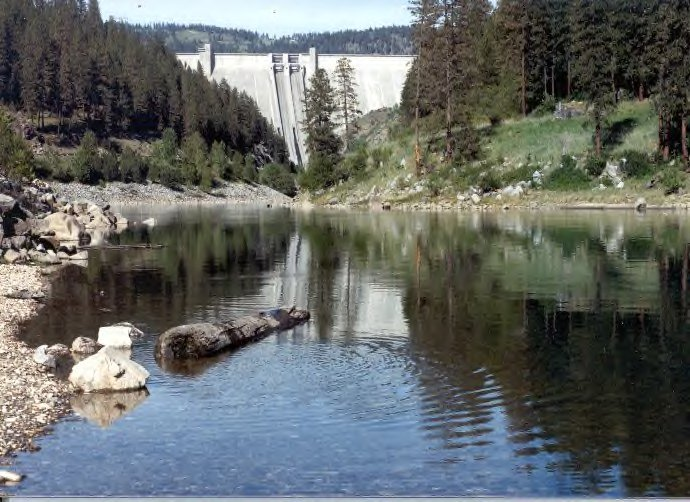
North Fork Clearwater River (13th longest) below Dworshak Dam

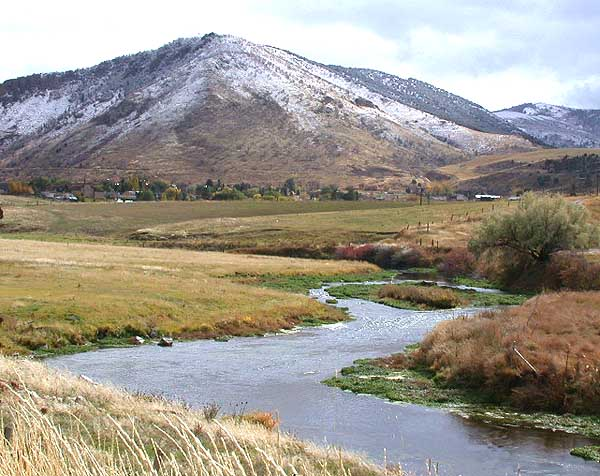
Portneuf River (17th longest) west of Soda Springs

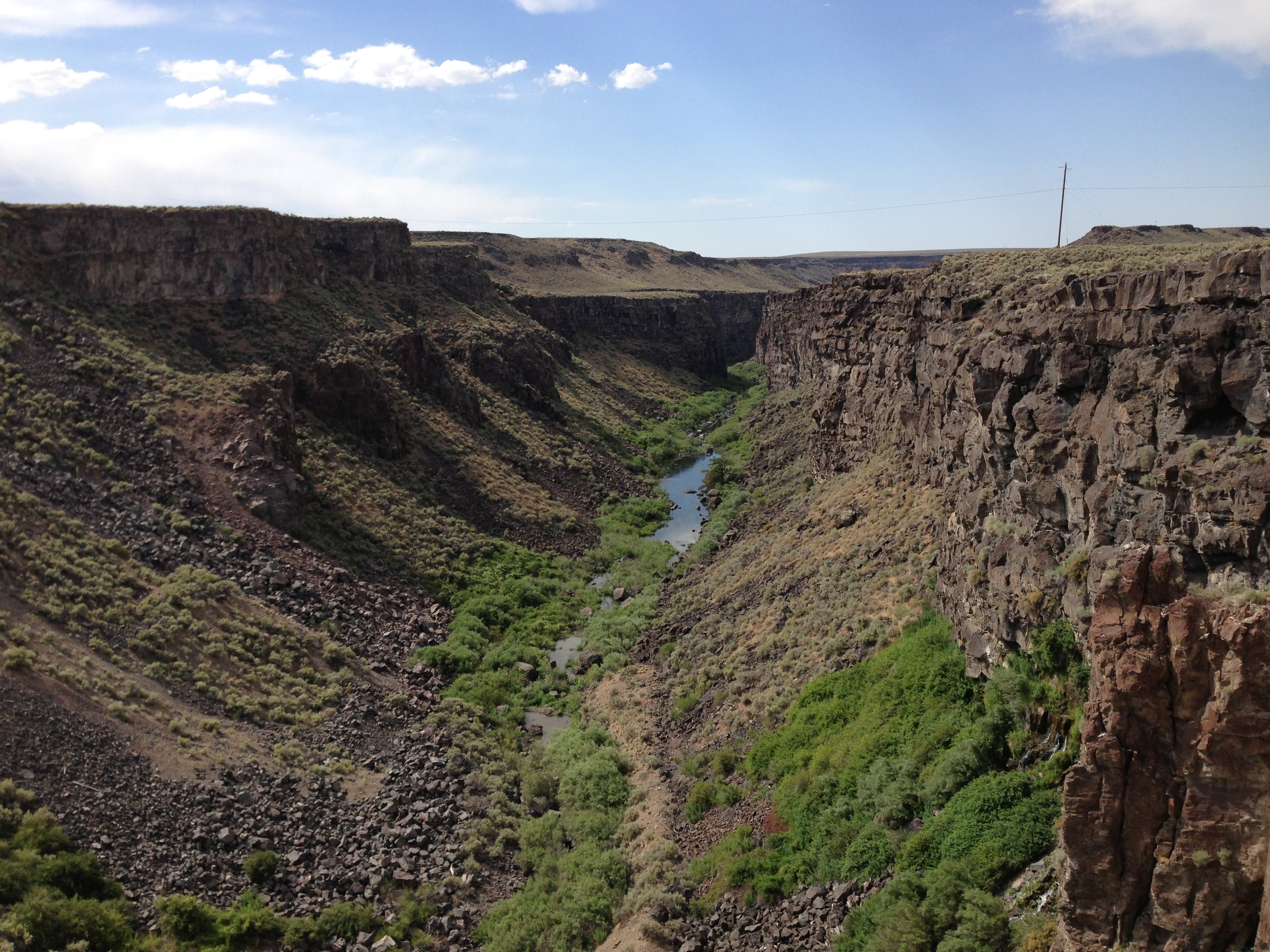
Salmon Falls Creek (19th longest) below Salmon Falls Dam

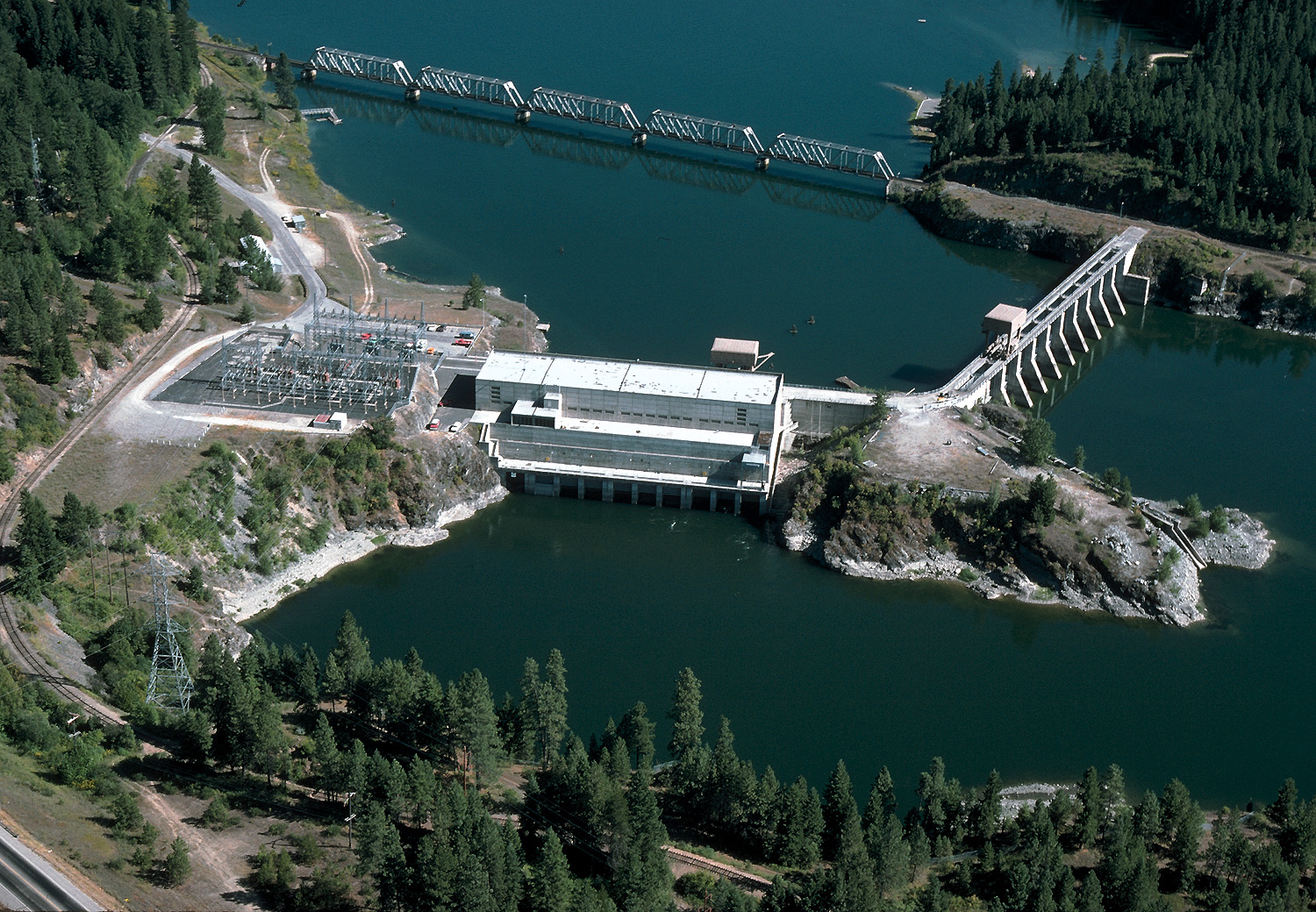
Pend Oreille River (20th longest) at Albeni Falls Dam

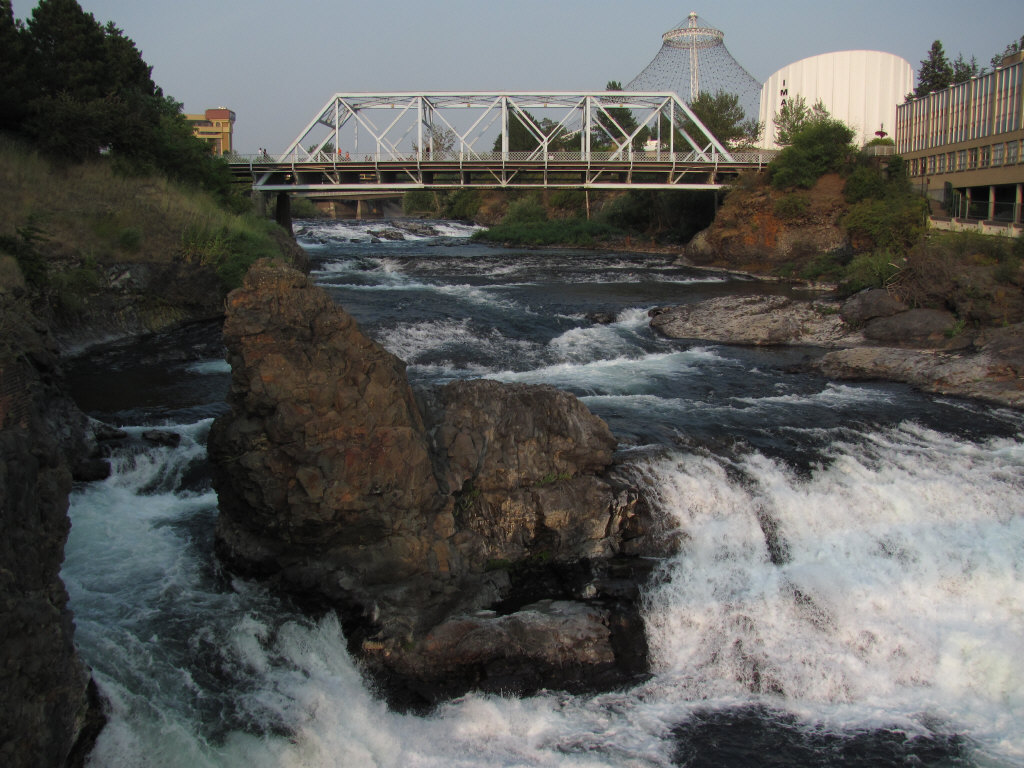
Spokane River (21st longest) in downtown Spokane, Washington

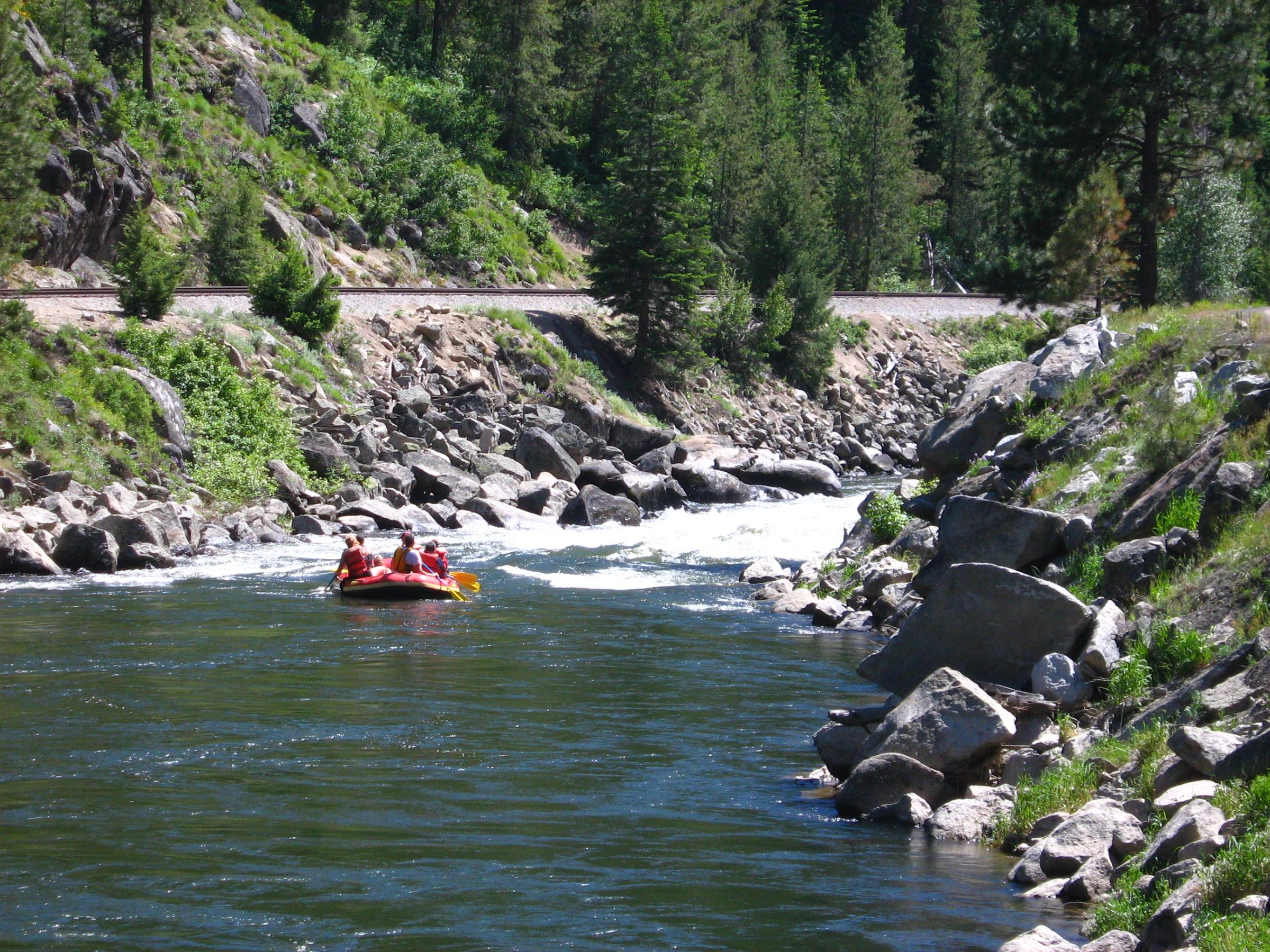
North Fork Payette River (24th longest) near Smiths Ferry

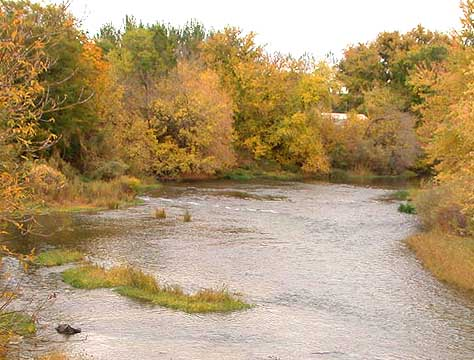
Weiser River (25th longest) near Weiser

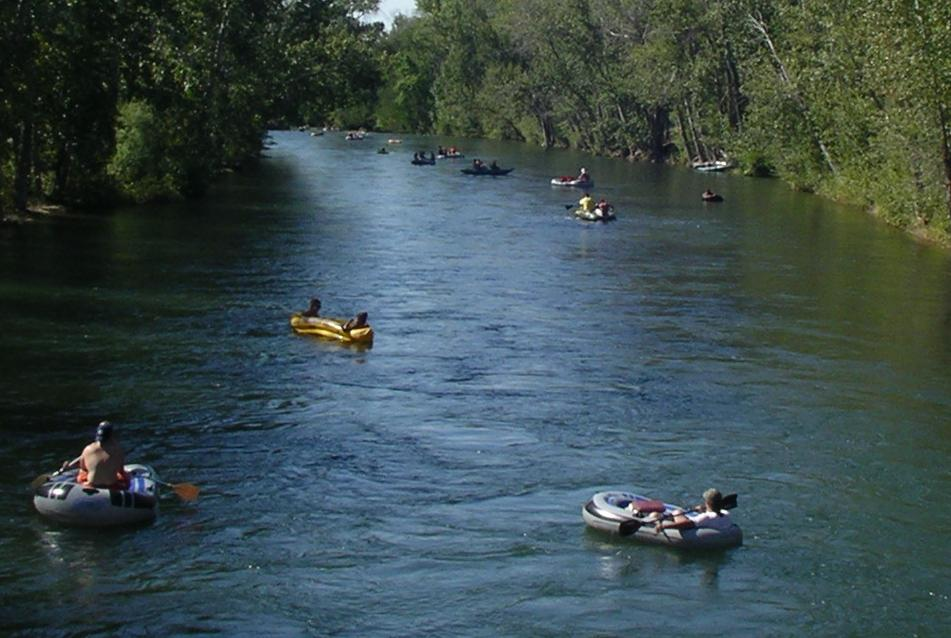
Boise River (26th longest) near Boise

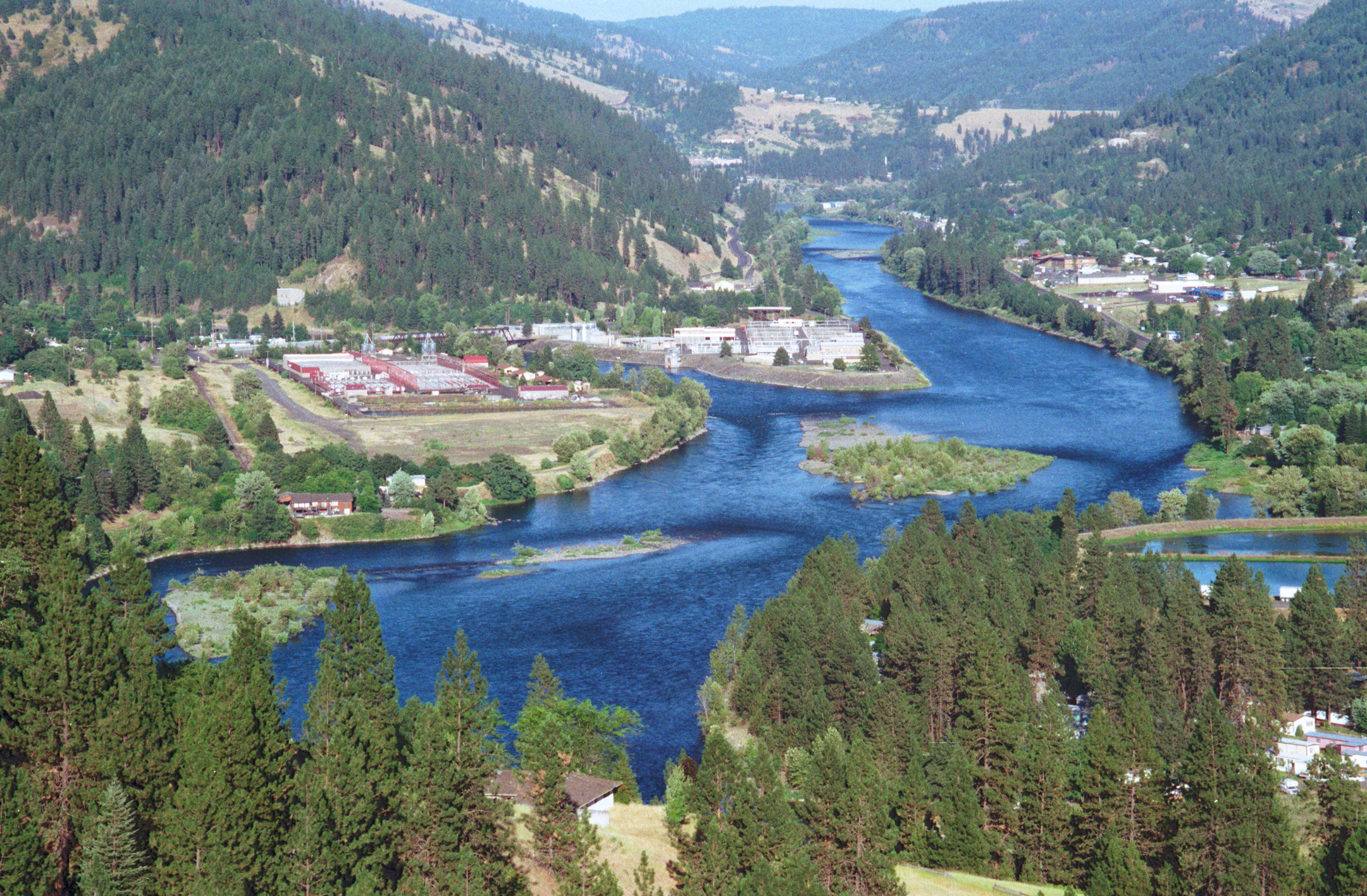
Clearwater River (40th longest) near Orofino

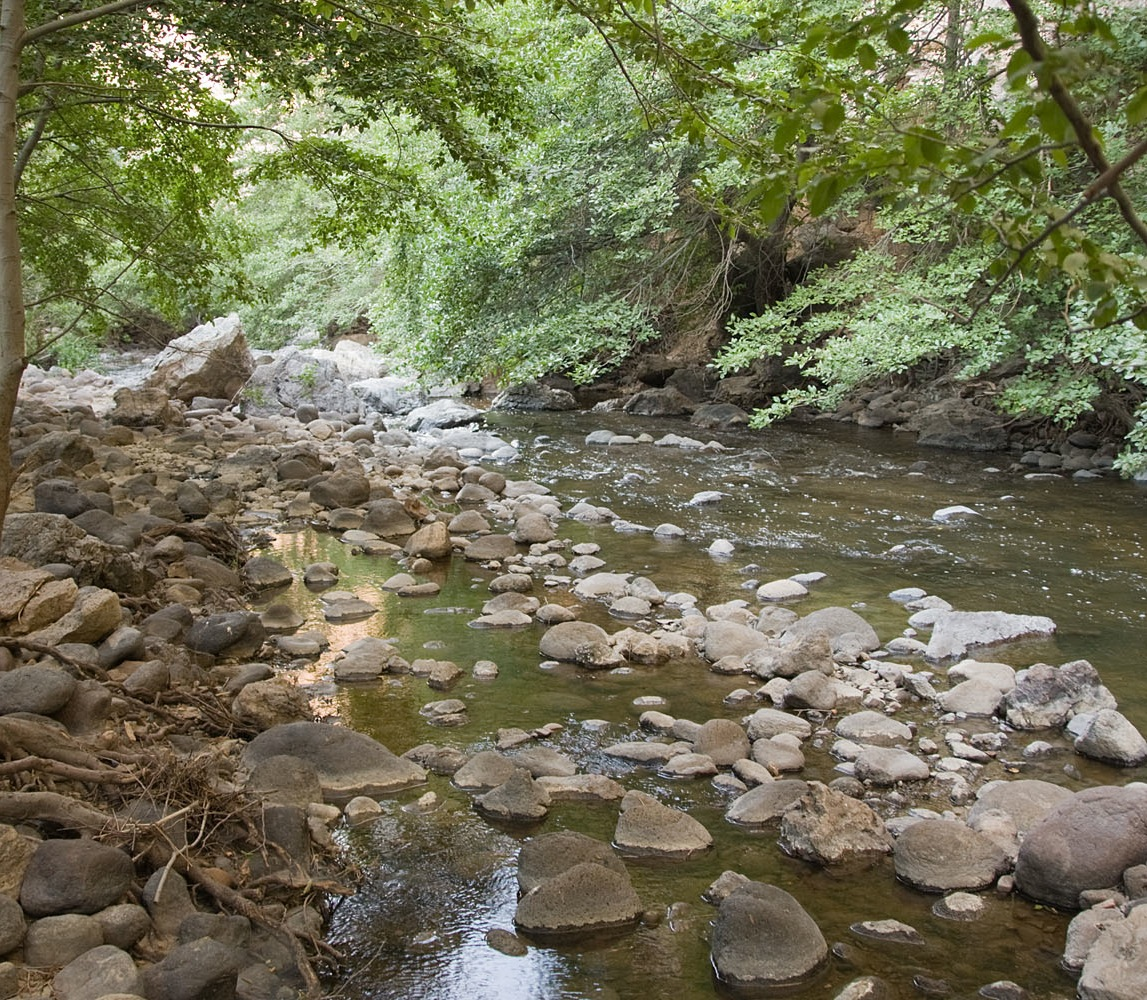
Succor Creek (43rd longest) in Malheur County, Oregon

== Map ==
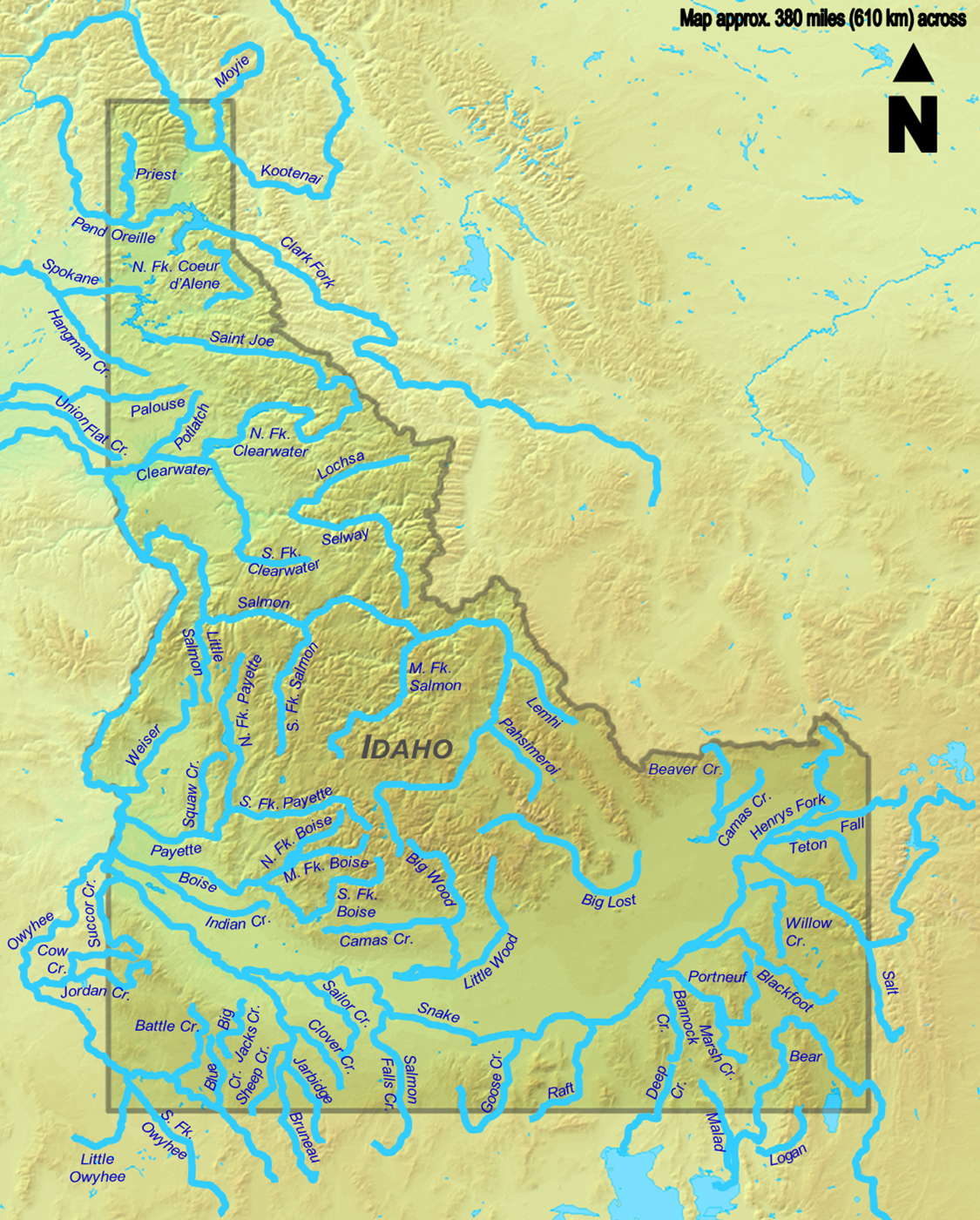
Image map of all Idaho streams more than 50 miles (80 kilometers) long. Each label is wikilinked to an article. Click on the small rectangles to the right of the caption for a larger map.

== See also ==
- List of rivers of Idaho
- List of longest rivers in the United States by state
- List of longest rivers of the United States (by main stem)

== Works cited ==
- Benchmark Maps (2010). Idaho Road and Recreation Atlas (Map) (2nd ed.). 1:250,000. Benchmark Maps. ISBN 978-0-929591-06-3. OCLC 567571371.
