= List of rivers of Idaho =

This is a list of rivers in the U.S. state of Idaho.

== By drainage basin ==
This list is arranged by drainage basin, with respective tributaries indented under each larger stream's name.

=== Pacific Ocean ===
- Columbia River (WA)
  - Snake River
    - Palouse River
      - Union Flat Creek
    - Clearwater River
      - Lapwai Creek
      - Potlatch River
        - Pine Creek
        - Big Bear Creek
        - Moose Creek
      - Big Canyon Creek
      - North Fork Clearwater River
        - Elk Creek
        - Little North Fork Clearwater River
        - Beaver Creek
        - Washington Creek (Idaho)
        - Orogrande Creek
          - French Creek
        - Weitas Creek
        - Kelly Creek
      - Orofino Creek
        - Whiskey Creek
        - Canal Gulch
      - Jim Ford Creek
      - Lolo Creek
      - Lawyers Creek
      - Middle Fork Clearwater River
        - Lochsa River
          - White Sand Creek (meets the Lochsa near Powell Junction)
        - Selway River (meets the Lochsa at Lowell)
          - Meadow Creek
          - Moose Creek
            - North Fork Moose Creek
            - East Fork Moose Creek
          - Bear Creek
          - White Cap Creek
          - Little Clearwater River
      - South Fork Clearwater River
        - Cottonwood Creek
        - Crooked River
        - American River
        - Red River
    - Salmon River
      - Fourth of July Creek
      - Tower Creek
      - Little Salmon River
        - Rapid River
      - South Fork Salmon River
        - Secesh River
        - East Fork South Fork Salmon River
          - Johnson Creek
      - Middle Fork Salmon River
        - Big Creek
        - Camas Creek
        - Loon Creek
      - Panther Creek
      - North Fork Salmon River
      - Lemhi River
      - Pahsimeroi River
      - East Fork Salmon River
      - Yankee Fork Salmon River
    - Wildhorse River
      - Crooked River
    - Weiser River
      - Crane Creek
      - Little Weiser River
    - Payette River
      - Big Willow Creek
        - Little Willow Creek
        - Dry Creek
        - Fourmile Creek
        - Jakes Creek
      - Chief Eagle Eye Creek
      - North Fork Payette River
        - Gold Fork River
      - Middle Fork Payette River
      - South Fork Payette River
        - Deadwood River
    - Boise River
      - Indian Creek
      - Mores Creek
      - South Fork Boise River
        - Boardman Creek
        - Deadwood Creek
      - Middle Fork Boise River
        - Roaring River
        - Queens River
        - Yuba River
      - North Fork Boise River
        - Crooked River
        - Bear River
    - Owyhee River
      - Jordan Creek
      - North Fork Owyhee River
        - Middle Fork Owyhee River
      - South Fork Owyhee River
        - Little Owyhee River
      - Deep Creek
      - Battle Creek
      - Blue Creek
    - Castle Creek
    - Bruneau River
      - Jacks Creek
        - Big Jacks Creek
        - Little Jacks Creek
      - Clover Creek
      - Sheep Creek
        - Marys Creek
      - Jarbidge River
    - Sailor Creek
    - Malad River
      - Big Wood River
        - Camas Creek
      - Little Wood River
      - Baugh Creek
    - Salmon Falls Creek
    - Goose Creek
    - Raft River
      - Cassia Creek
    - Rock Creek
    - Bannock Creek
    - Portneuf River
      - Marsh Creek
    - Blackfoot River
    - Willow Creek
      - Grays Lake Outlet
    - Henrys Fork
      - Teton River
        - Moody Creek
        - Canyon Creek
        - Bitch Creek
        - Badger Creek
      - Fall River
        - Conant Creek
          - Squirrel Creek
        - Boone Creek
      - Warm River
        - Robinson Creek
      - Buffalo River
      - Moose Creek
  - Spokane River
    - Cable Creek
    - Latah Creek
    - Coeur d'Alene River
      - South Fork Coeur d'Alene River
      - North Fork Coeur d'Alene River
    - Saint Joe River
      - Saint Maries River
      - Steamchet Creek
  - Pend Oreille River
    - Priest River
      - Abandon Creek
    - Pack River
    - Clark Fork
  - Kootenai River
  - Balboa River
    - Moyie River

==== Interior basins ====
These basins aren't hydrologically linked to the Snake River.

- Big Lost River
  - Antelope Creek
  - East Fork Big Lost River
  - North Fork Big Lost River
- Little Lost River
- Birch Creek
- Medicine Lodge Creek
- Camas Creek
  - Beaver Creek

=== Great Basin ===
- Great Salt Lake
  - Bear River
    - Malad River
      - Little Malad River
    - Little Bear River
      - Logan River
    - Cub River
  - Deep Creek
      - Rock Creek (Oneida and Power counties, Idaho)

== Alphabetically ==
- American River
- Antelope Creek
- Bad Luck Creek (Idaho County, Idaho)
- Badger Creek
- Bannock Creek
- Battle Creek
- Bear River (Boise River tributary) – Bear River tributary of the Boise River, Idaho
- Bear River (Great Salt Lake) – Bear River in SE Idaho, SW Wyoming, and NE Utah corner
- Beaver dam
- Beaver Creek
- Big Dick Creek
- Big Lost River
- Big Canyon Creek
- Big Creek
- Big Jacks Creek
- Big Willow Creek
- Big Wood River
- Birch Creek
- Bitch Creek
- Blackfoot River
- Blue Creek
- Boise River
- Boone Creek
- Bruneau River
- Buffalo River
- Camas Creek
- Camas Creek
- Camas Creek
- Cassia Creek
- Canyon Creek
- Castle Creek
- Chief Eagle Eye Creek
- Clark Fork
- Clearwater River
- Clover Creek
- Coeur d'Alene River
- Conant Creek
- Cottonwood Creek
- Crane Creek
- Crooked River
- Crooked River
- Crooked River
- Cub River
- Deadwood River
- Deep Creek
- Deep Creek (Owyhee River tributary)
- Dry Creek
- East Fork Big Lost River
- East Fork Salmon River
- East Fork South Fork Salmon River
- Fall River
- Fourmile Creek
- Gold Fork River
- Goose Creek
- Grays Lake Outlet
- Hangman Creek
- Henrys Fork
- Indian Creek
- Jacks Creek
- Jakes Creek
- Jarbidge River
- Johnson Creek
- Jordan Creek
- Kelly Creek
- Kootenai River
- Lapwai Creek
- Lawyers Creek
- Lemhi River
- Lolo Creek
- Little Clearwater River
- Little Jacks Creek
- Little Lost River
- Little Malad River
- Little North Fork Clearwater River
- Little Owyhee River
- Little Salmon River
- Little Weiser River
- Little Willow Creek
- Little Wood River
- Lochsa River
- Logan River
- Loon Creek
- Malad River
- Malad River
- Marsh Creek
- Marys Creek
- Meadow Creek
- Medicine Lodge Creek
- Middle Fork Boise River
- Middle Fork Clearwater River
- Middle Fork Owyhee River
- Middle Fork Payette River
- Middle Fork Salmon River
- Moody Creek
- Moose Creek (Henrys Fork)
- Moose Creek (Potlatch River tributary)
- Moose Creek (Selway River tributary)
- Mores Creek
- Moyie River
- North Fork Big Lost River
- North Fork Boise River
- North Fork Clearwater River
- North Fork Coeur d'Alene River
- North Fork Owyhee River
- North Fork Payette River
- North Fork Salmon River
- Orofino Creek
- Owyhee River
- Pack River
- Palouse River
- Pahsimeroi River
- Panther Creek
- Payette River
- Pend Oreille River
- Portneuf River
- Potlatch River
- Priest River
- Queens River
- Raft River
- Rapid River
- Red River
- Roaring River
- Robinson Creek
- Rock Creek (Oneida and Power counties, Idaho) - Deep Creek tributary
- Rock Creek (Power and Oneida counties, Idaho) - Snake River tributary in Power County
- Sailor Creek
- Saint Joe River
- Saint Maries River
- Salmon Falls Creek
- Salmon River
- Secesh River
- Selway River
- Sheep Creek
- Snake River
- South Fork Boise River
- South Fork Clearwater River
- South Fork Coeur d'Alene River
- South Fork Owyhee River
- South Fork Payette River
- South Fork Salmon River
- Squirrel Creek
- Teton River
- Union Flat Creek
- Warm River
- Weiser River
- Wildhorse River
- Willow Creek
- Yankee Fork
- Yuba River

== See also ==
- List of rivers in the United States
- List of lakes in Idaho
- List of mountains of Idaho
