= Succor Creek =

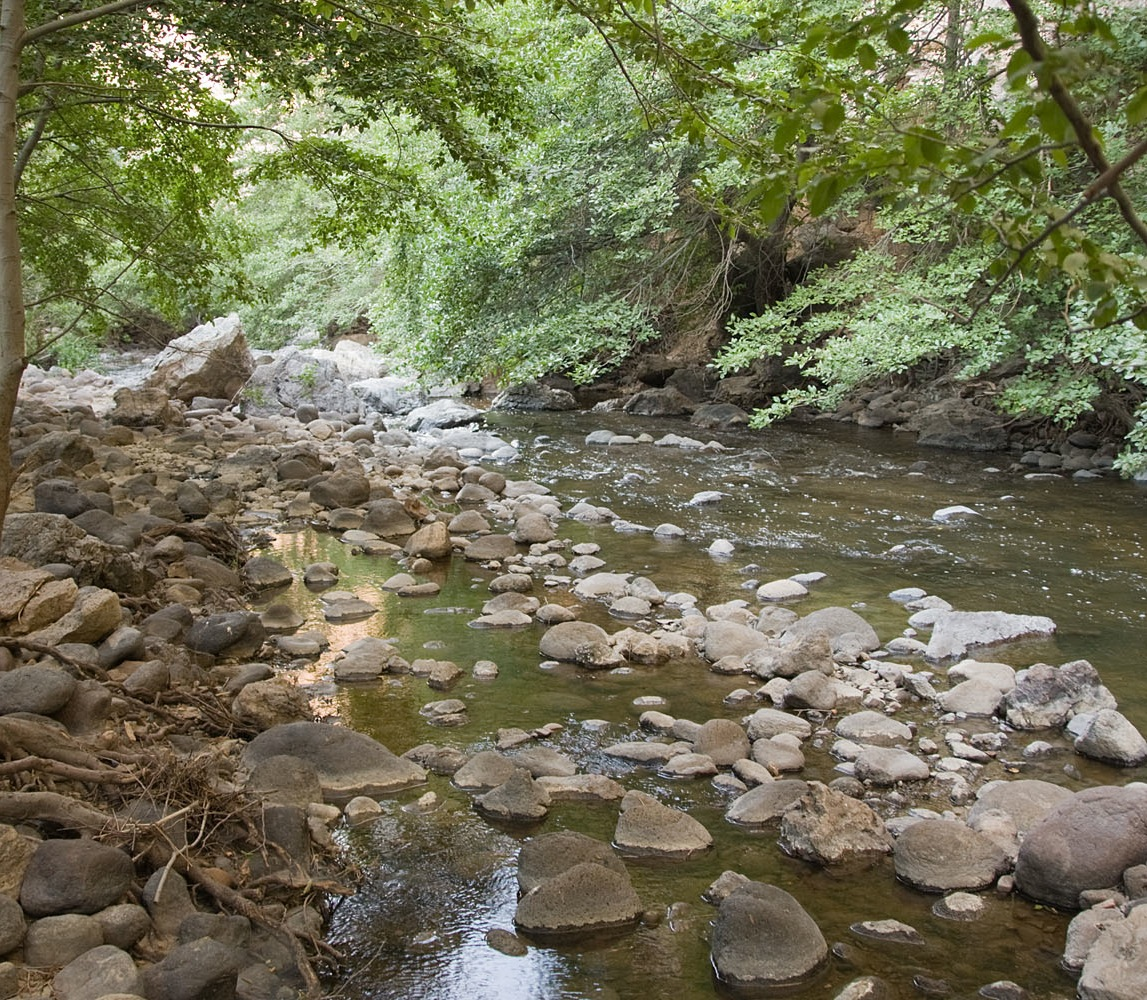
- Succor Creek in Malheur County, Oregon

- Location of the mouth of Succor Creek in Idaho
- Etymology: Obscure, but possibly for the creek's fresh water, which gave aid (succor) to early travelers south of the Snake River.

Location
- Country: United States
- State: Idaho, Oregon
- County: Owyhee, Malheur

Physical characteristics
- Source: Owyhee Mountains
  - location: near Johnston Lakes, Owyhee County, Idaho
  - coordinates: 43°05′45″N 116°50′18″W
  - elevation: 6,976 ft (2,126 m)
- Mouth: Snake River
  - location: near Homedale, Owyhee County, Idaho
  - coordinates: 43°37′55″N 116°56′47″W
  - elevation: 2,211 ft (674 m)
- Length: 69 mi (111 km)
- Basin size: 494 sq mi (1,280 km^{2})

Succor Creek is a 69.4-mile-long (111.7 km) tributary of the Snake River in the U.S. states of Idaho and Oregon. The creek begins in the Owyhee Mountains in Owyhee County, Idaho. After flowing for about 23 miles (37 km) in Idaho, Succor Creek enters Malheur County, Oregon, where it flows for 39 miles (63 km) before re-entering Idaho for its final 5 miles (8.0 km). It joins the Snake near Homedale, about 413 river miles (665 km) from the larger river's confluence with the Columbia River.

Succor Creek State Natural Area is 30 miles (48 km) south of Nyssa along an unpaved road off Oregon Route 201. It has only primitive camping with no potable water. The canyon in which the natural area is located is known for fossils, geologic formations, and thundereggs, the Oregon state rock.

== See also ==
- List of rivers of Oregon
- List of longest streams of Oregon
- List of rivers of Idaho
- List of longest streams of Idaho
