= Clover Creek (Bruneau River tributary) =

- Location of the mouth of Clover Creek in Idaho Clover Creek (Bruneau River tributary) (the United States)

Location
- Country: United States
- State: Idaho
- County: Owyhee County, Idaho

Physical characteristics
- Source
  - location: Owyhee County, Idaho
  - coordinates: 42°09′28″N 115°12′43″W
  - elevation: 5,229 ft (1,594 m)
- Mouth: Bruneau River
  - location: Bruneau – Jarbidge Rivers Wilderness, Owyhee County, Idaho
  - coordinates: 42°34′35″N 115°38′07″W
  - elevation: 3,218 ft (981 m)
- Length: 55 mi (89 km)

Clover Creek (previously East Fork Bruneau River) is a 55-mile (89 km) long tributary of the Bruneau River in the U.S. state of Idaho. Beginning at an elevation of 5,229 feet (1,594 m) in southeastern Owyhee County, it flows generally northwest through East Fork Bruneau Canyon to its mouth in the Bruneau – Jarbidge Rivers Wilderness, at an elevation of 3,218 feet (980.8 m).

== See also ==
- List of rivers of Idaho
- List of longest streams of Idaho
