= Bannock Creek =

Creek in Power and Oneida counties in Idaho, United States

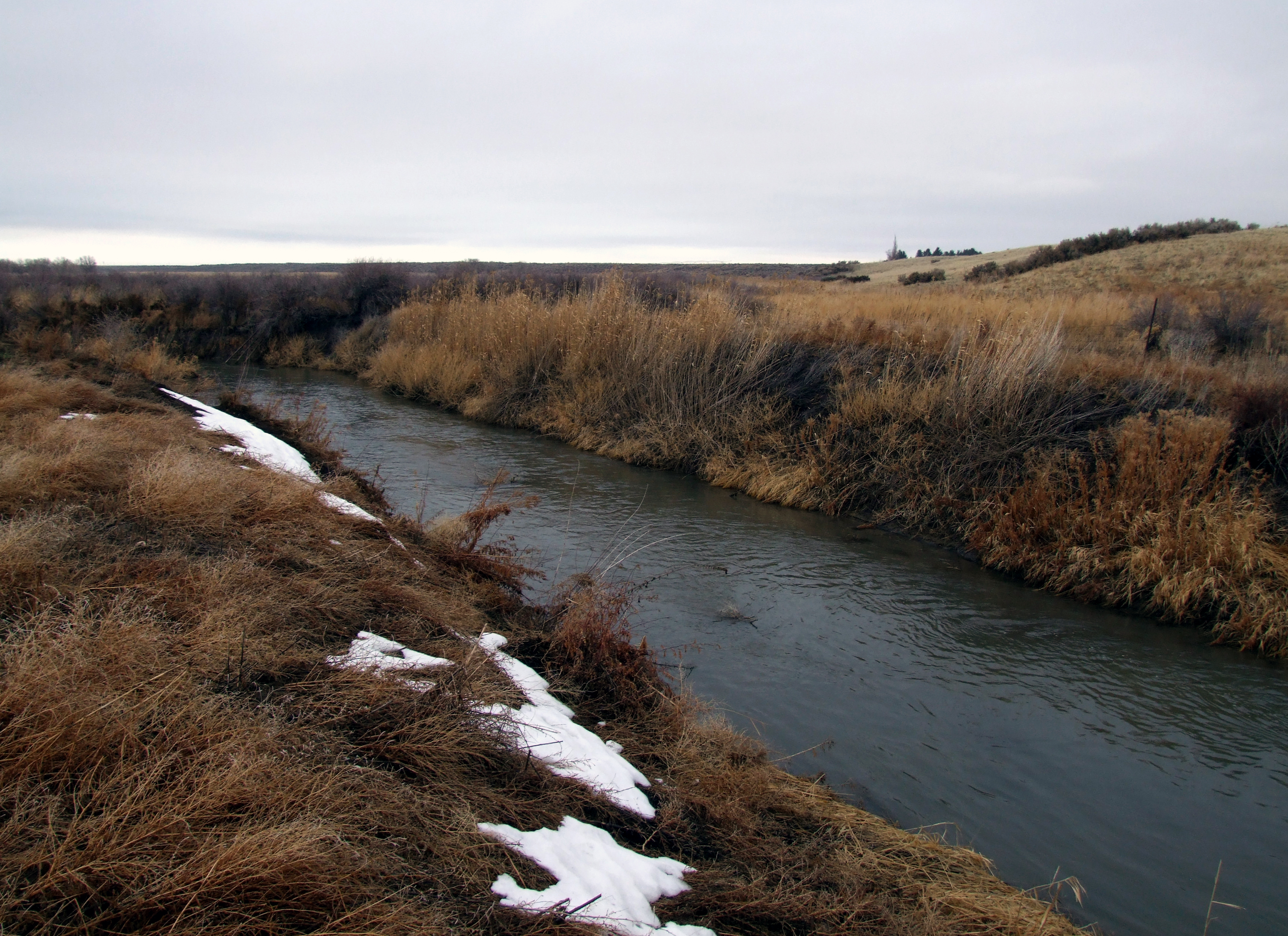

- Location of the mouth of Bannock Creek in Idaho Location of the mouth of Bannock Creek in the United States

Location
- Country: United States
- State: Idaho
- Counties: Power, Oneida

Physical characteristics
- Source
  - location: north of Holbrook, Oneida County, Idaho
  - coordinates: 42°22′56″N 112°38′36″W
  - elevation: 5,953 ft (1,814 m)
- Mouth: Snake River
  - location: west of Pocatello, Power County, Idaho
  - coordinates: 42°53′14″N 112°41′02″W
  - elevation: 4,357 ft (1,328 m)
- Length: 67 mi (108 km)
- Basin size: 475 sq mi (1,230 km^{2})

Bannock Creek is a 67-mile (108 km) long tributary of the Snake River in Power and Oneida counties in Idaho, United States, that is a tributary of the Snake River.

== Description ==
Beginning at an elevation of 5,953 feet (1,814 m) north of Holbrook in northern Oneida County, it flows north into Power County and through the Arbon Valley, the town of Pauline, and the Fort Hall Indian Reservation. It then reaches its mouth at American Falls Reservoir, and impoundment of the Snake River, midway between the towns of American Falls and Pocatello, at an elevation of 4,357 feet (1,328 m). Bannock Creek has a 475-square-mile (1,230 km^{2}) watershed.

== See also ==
- List of rivers of Idaho
- List of longest streams of Idaho
