= Yankee Fork Salmon River =

Yankee Fork
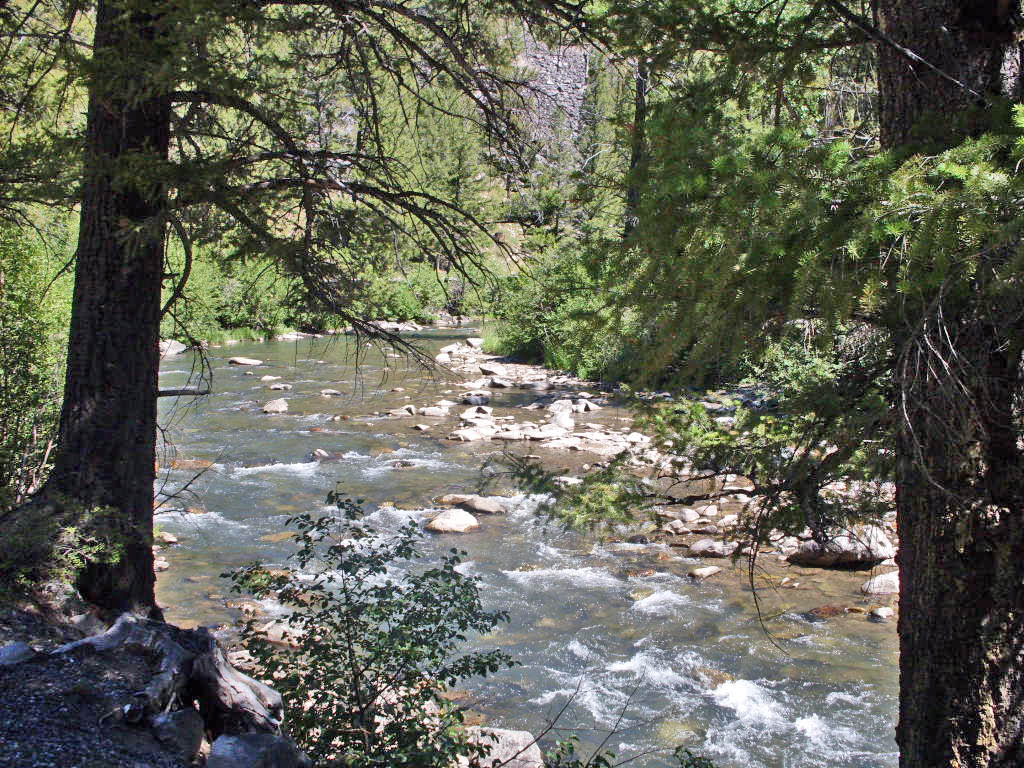
- Yankee Fork Salmon River

- Location of the mouth of Yankee Fork Salmon River in Idaho Yankee Fork Salmon River (the United States)

Location
- Country: United States
- State: Idaho

Physical characteristics
- Source: Salmon River Mountains
  - location: Salmon–Challis National Forest
  - coordinates: 44°30′59″N 114°36′17″W
  - elevation: 8,600 ft (2,600 m)
- Mouth: Salmon River
  - location: Near Stanley
  - coordinates: 44°16′11″N 114°44′04″W
  - elevation: 5,915 ft (1,803 m)
- Length: 28 mi (45 km)
- Basin size: 189 sq mi (490 km^{2})
- Discharge
  - location: near Clayton, about 0.5 mi (0.80 km) from the mouth
  - average: 199 cu ft/s (5.6 m^{3}/s)
  - minimum: 10 cu ft/s (0.28 m^{3}/s)
  - maximum: 3,360 cu ft/s (95 m^{3}/s)

The Yankee Fork Salmon River is a 28-mile (45 km) tributary of the Salmon River in Custer County, Idaho in the United States. It originates in the Salmon River Mountains, in the Salmon-Challis National Forest, and flows south to its confluence at Sunbeam, about 10 miles (16 km) east of Stanley.

== See also ==
- List of rivers of Idaho
