= Sailor Creek =

- Location of the mouth of Sailor Creek in Idaho

Location
- Country: United States
- State: Idaho
- Counties: Owyhee County, Idaho, Elmore County, Idaho

Physical characteristics
- Source
  - location: southwest of Castleford, Owyhee County, Idaho
  - coordinates: 42°22′52″N 115°12′59″W
  - elevation: 4,879 ft (1,487 m)
- Mouth: Snake River
  - location: near Hammett, Owyhee County, Idaho
  - coordinates: 42°55′43″N 115°28′48″W
  - elevation: 2,467 ft (752 m)
- Length: 64 mi (103 km)

Sailor Creek is a 64-mile-long (103 km) tributary of the Snake River in the U.S. state of Idaho. Beginning at an elevation of 4,879 feet (1,487 m) southwest of Castleford in southeastern Owyhee County, it flows north through the Bruneau Desert, briefly crossing into Elmore County in the process. It then flows northwest to its mouth near Hammett, at an elevation of 2,467 feet (751.9 m).

== See also ==
- List of rivers of Idaho
- List of longest streams of Idaho
