= Big Jacks Creek =

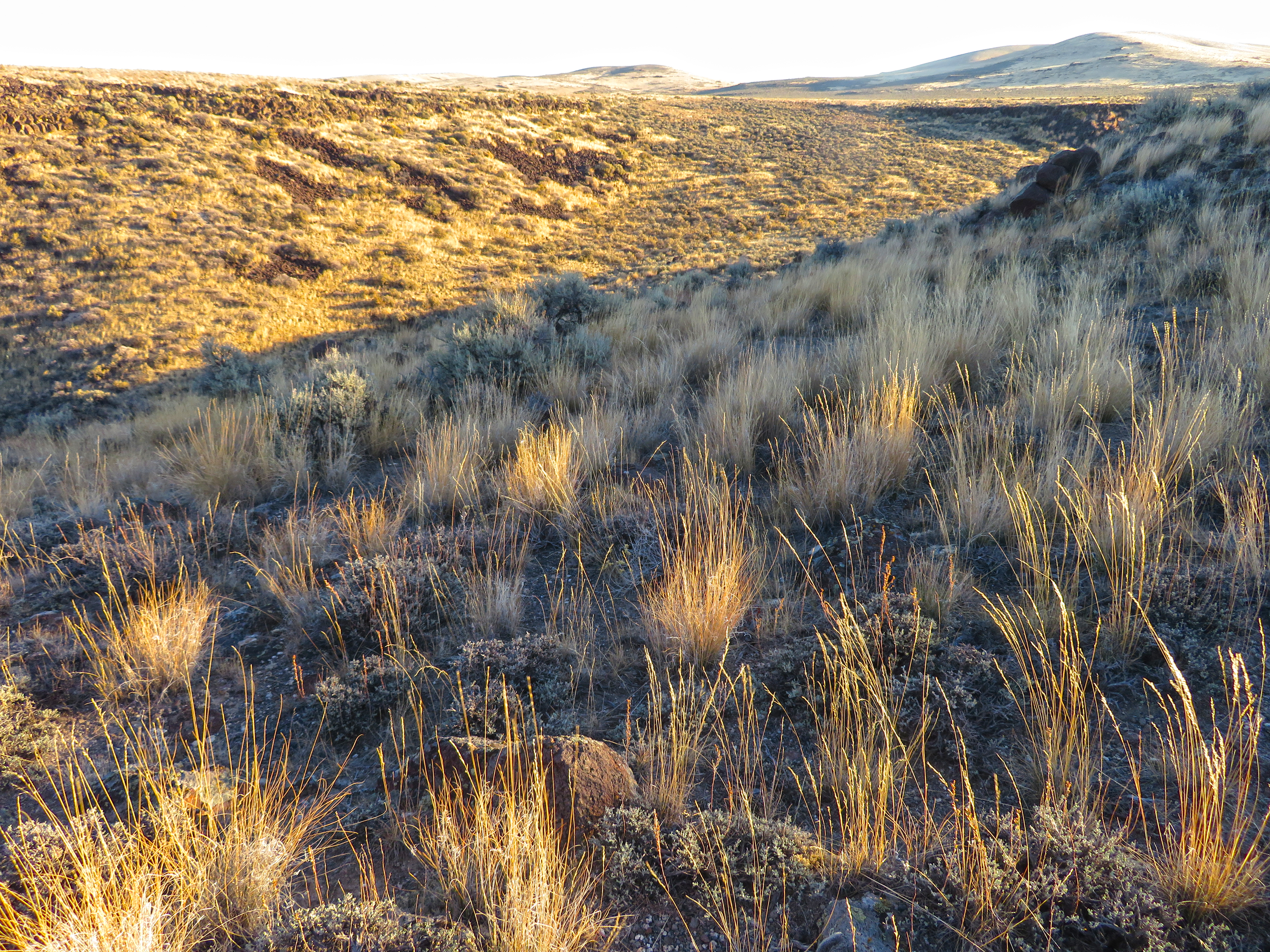
- Big Jacks Creek Wilderness

- Location of the mouth of Big Jacks Creek in Idaho Big Jacks Creek (the United States)

Location
- Country: United States
- State: Idaho
- County: Owyhee County, Idaho

Physical characteristics
- Source
  - location: north of Riddle, Owyhee County, Idaho
  - coordinates: 42°22′56″N 116°06′29″W
  - elevation: 5,935 ft (1,809 m)
- Mouth: Jacks Creek
  - location: southwest of Bruneau, Owyhee County
  - coordinates: 42°47′12″N 115°58′41″W
  - elevation: 2,779 ft (847 m)
- Length: 58 mi (93 km)

National Wild and Scenic Rivers System
- Type: Wild
- Designated: March 30, 2009

Big Jacks Creek is a 58-mile (93 km) long tributary of Jacks Creek in Owyhee County, Idaho. Beginning at an elevation of 5,935 feet (1,809 m) north of Riddle, it flows generally north and slightly east through the arid Big Jacks Creek Wilderness, before reaching its mouth southwest of Bruneau, at an elevation of 2,779 feet (847.0 m). In 2009, 35.0 miles (56.3 km) of the creek were designated as wild by the Omnibus Public Land Management Act, which also created the Big Jacks Creek Wilderness.

== See also ==
- List of rivers of Idaho
- List of longest streams of Idaho
- List of National Wild and Scenic Rivers
