= Abandon Creek =

Stream in Idaho, USA

Abandon Run Tributary to Caribou Creek
- Location of Abandon Run mouth Abandon Creek (the United States)

Location
- Country: United States
- State: Idaho
- County: Boundary

Physical characteristics
- Source: Lion Creek divide
  - location: about 2 miles west of "The Lions Head"
  - coordinates: 48°47′12″N 116°44′30″W
  - elevation: 4,980 ft (1,520 m)
- Mouth: Caribou Creek
  - location: about 8 miles southwest of West Fork Lake
  - coordinates: 48°49′15″N 116°46′42″W
  - elevation: 3,461 ft (1,055 m)
- Length: 3.03 mi (4.88 km)
- Basin size: 6.49 square miles (16.8 km^{2})
- Discharge
  - location: Caribou Creek
  - average: 27.23 cu ft/s (0.771 m^{3}/s) at mouth with Caribou Creek

Basin features
- Progression: Caribou Creek → Priest River → Pend Oreille River → Columbia River → Pacific Ocean
- River system: Columbia River
- Tributaries
  - left: unnamed tributaties
  - right: unnamed tributaries
- Bridges: none

Abandon Creek is a stream in the U.S. state of Idaho. It is a tributary of Caribou Creek.

Abandon Creek was named because of its isolated location.

== Variant names ==
According to the Geographic Names Information System, it has also been known historically as:

- Caribou Creek

== See also ==
- List of rivers of Idaho
