= Sheep Creek (Bruneau River tributary) =

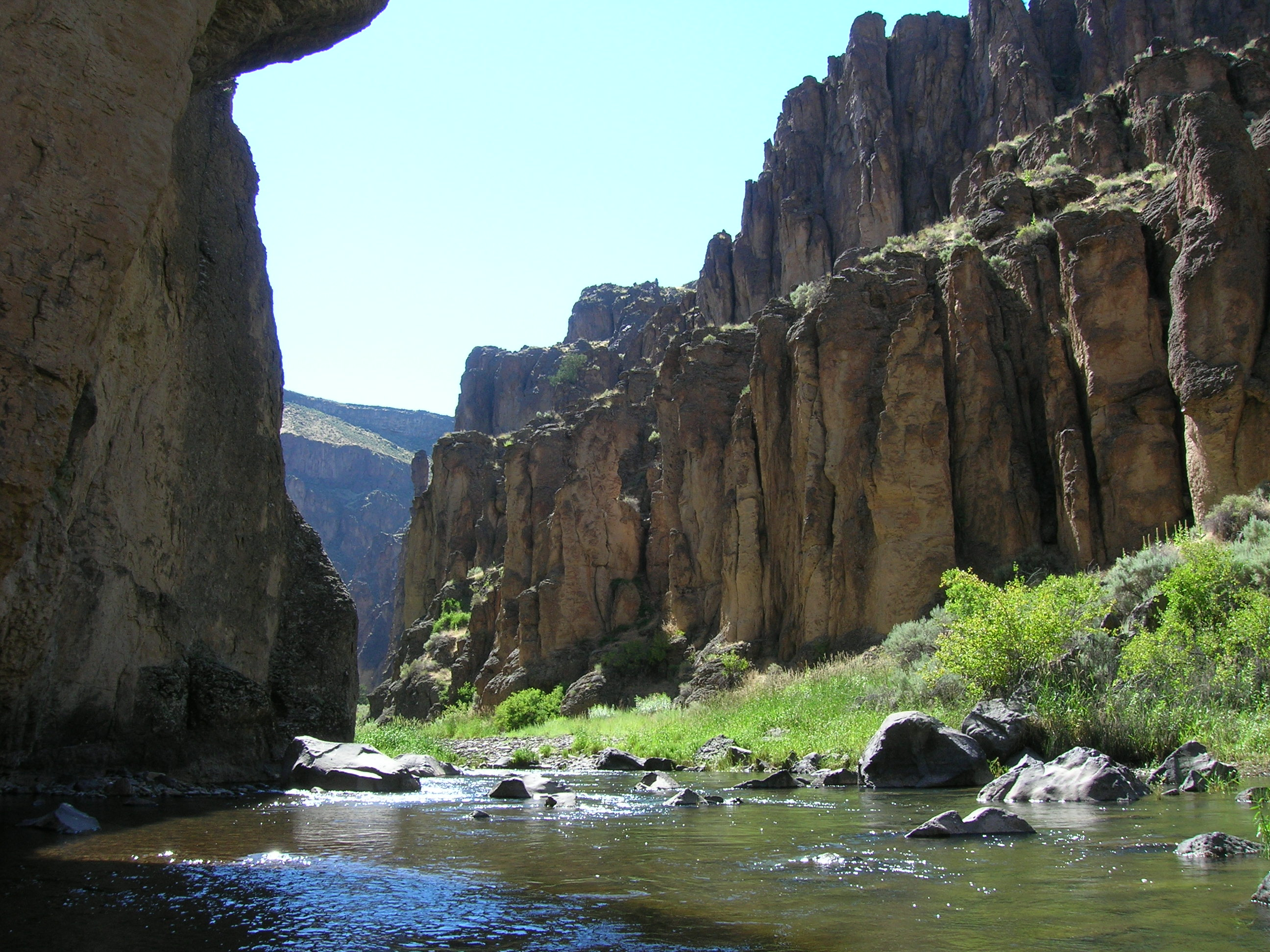
- Sheep Creek

- Location of the mouth of Sheep Creek in Idaho Sheep Creek (Bruneau River tributary) (the United States)

Location
- Country: United States
- State: Idaho, Nevada
- Counties: Owyhee County, Idaho, Elko County, Nevada

Physical characteristics
- Source
  - location: east of Owyhee, Nevada, Elko County, Nevada
  - coordinates: 41°58′18″N 115°55′07″W
  - elevation: 6,126 ft (1,867 m)
- Mouth: Bruneau River
  - location: Bruneau – Jarbidge Rivers Wilderness, Owyhee County, Idaho
  - coordinates: 42°29′55″N 115°35′50″W
  - elevation: 3,415 ft (1,041 m)
- Length: 63 mi (101 km)

National Wild and Scenic Rivers System
- Type: Wild
- Designated: March 30, 2009

Sheep Creek is a 63-mile (101 km) long tributary of the Bruneau River. Beginning at an elevation of 6,126 feet (1,867 m) east of Owyhee in northern Elko County, Nevada, it flows generally north into Owyhee County, Idaho and the Owyhee Desert, where it is roughly paralleled by Idaho State Highway 51. It then flows to its mouth in the Bruneau – Jarbidge Rivers Wilderness, at an elevation of 3,415 feet (1,041 m). In 2009, 25.6 miles (41.2 km) of the creek were designated as wild by the Omnibus Public Land Management Act, which also created the Bruneau – Jarbidge Rivers Wilderness.

== See also ==
- List of rivers of Idaho
- List of longest streams of Idaho
- List of rivers of Nevada
- List of National Wild and Scenic Rivers
