= Battle Creek (Owyhee River tributary) =

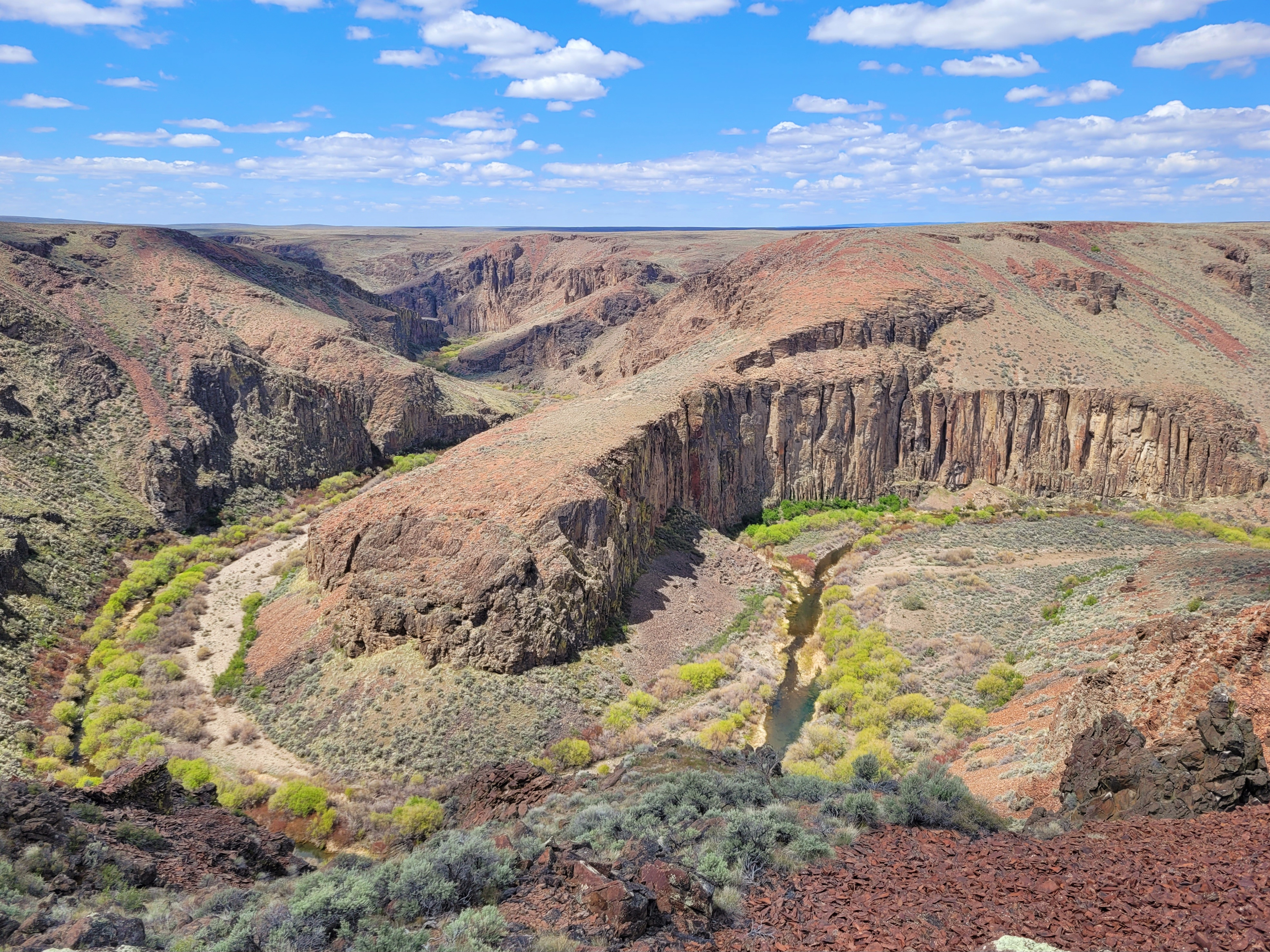
- Battle Creek

- Location of the mouth of Battle Creek in Idaho Battle Creek (Owyhee River tributary) (the United States)

Location
- Country: United States
- State: Idaho
- County: Owyhee County, Idaho

Physical characteristics
- Source
  - location: Owyhee County, Idaho
  - coordinates: 42°44′32″N 116°24′16″W
  - elevation: 6,704 ft (2,043 m)
- Mouth: Owyhee River
  - location: west of Riddle, Owyhee County, Idaho
  - coordinates: 42°14′14″N 116°31′29″W
  - elevation: 4,636 ft (1,413 m)
- Length: 67 mi (108 km)

National Wild and Scenic Rivers System
- Type: Wild
- Designated: March 30, 2009

Battle Creek is a 67-mile (110 km) long tributary of the Owyhee River. Beginning at an elevation of 6,704 feet (2,043 m) in central Owyhee County, Idaho, it flows generally south through the Owyhee Desert to its mouth west of Riddle, at an elevation of 4,636 feet (1,413 m). In 2009, 23.4 miles (37.7 km) of the creek were designated as wild by the Omnibus Public Land Management Act, which also created the Owyhee River Wilderness.

== See also ==
- List of rivers of Idaho
- List of longest streams of Idaho
- List of National Wild and Scenic Rivers
