= Chief Eagle Eye Creek (Payette River tributary) =

- Location of the mouth of Chief Eagle Eye Creek in Idaho Chief Eagle Eye Creek (Payette River tributary) (the United States)

Location
- Country: United States
- State: Idaho
- Counties: Gem County, Idaho, Valley County, Idaho

Physical characteristics
- Source
  - location: southwest of Cascade, Valley County, Idaho
  - coordinates: 44°26′10″N 116°09′09″W
  - elevation: 7,483 ft (2,281 m)
- Mouth: Payette River
  - location: Black Canyon Reservoir, Gem County, Idaho
  - coordinates: 43°56′16″N 116°22′01″W
  - elevation: 2,507 ft (764 m)
- Length: 61 mi (98 km)

Chief Eagle Eye Creek (formerly Squaw Creek) is a 61-mile (98 km) long a river in western Idaho, United States, that is a tributary of the Payette River.

== Description ==
Beginning at an elevation of 7,483 feet (2,281 m) southwest of Cascade in southwestern Valley County, it quickly flows north and then west into Gem County. From there, it flows generally south, passing through the communities of Ola and Sweet, before reaching its mouth at Black Canyon Reservoir, at an elevation of 2,507 feet (764.1 m).

== Name change ==
Due to the derogatory connotation of the word squaw, the United States Board on Geographic Names approved changing the creek's name from Squaw Creek to Chief Eagle Eye Creek on September 8, 2022.

== See also ==
- List of rivers of Idaho
- List of longest streams of Idaho
