= Bad Luck Creek (Idaho County, Idaho) =

Stream in the state of Idaho

Coordinates: 45°53′15″N 114°45′55″W

Bad Luck Creek is a stream in Idaho County, Idaho, in the United States. It is located within the Selway-Bitterroot Wilderness.

== See also ==
- List of rivers of Idaho
