= Blue Creek (Owyhee River tributary) =

- Location of the mouth of Blue Creek in Idaho Blue Creek (Owyhee River tributary) (the United States)

Location
- Country: United States
- State: Idaho
- County: Owyhee County, Idaho

Physical characteristics
- Source
  - location: Owyhee County, Idaho
  - coordinates: 42°32′05″N 116°16′04″W
  - elevation: 6,097 ft (1,858 m)
- Mouth: Owyhee River
  - location: northwest of Owyhee, Nevada, Owyhee County, Idaho
  - coordinates: 42°01′48″N 116°12′37″W
  - elevation: 5,289 ft (1,612 m)
- Length: 53 mi (85 km)

Blue Creek is a 53-mile (85 km) long tributary of the Owyhee River in the U.S. state of Idaho. Beginning at an elevation of 6,097 feet (1,858 m) in central Owyhee County, it flows generally south through the Owyhee Desert and near the community of Riddle, where it is roughly paralleled by Idaho State Highway 51. It then flows into the Duck Valley Indian Reservation to its mouth near the Idaho/Nevada border northwest of Owyhee, Nevada, at an elevation of 5,289 feet (1,612 m). also related to Blue Creek Road on the Idaho side of the Duck Valley Indian Reservation.

== See also ==
- List of rivers of Idaho
- List of longest streams of Idaho
