= Cub River =

Stream in Idaho and Utah, United States

Coordinates: 41.8979831°N 111.8791142°W

Cub River is a stream in Franklin County, Idaho and Cache County, Utah, United States.

According to tradition, Cub River was so named by pioneer Brigham Young for its smaller size relative to the nearby Bear River.

== See also ==
- List of rivers of Idaho
- List of rivers of Utah
