= Marsh Creek (Portneuf River tributary) =

Creek in Bannock County, Idaho, United States

- Location of the mouth of Marsh Creek in Idaho Marsh Creek (Portneuf River tributary) (the United States)

Location
- Country: United States
- State: Idaho
- County: Bannock County, Idaho

Physical characteristics
- Source
  - location: near Red Rock Pass, Bannock County, Idaho
  - coordinates: 42°24′12″N 112°01′37″W
  - elevation: 5,157 ft (1,572 m)
- Mouth: Portneuf River
  - location: near Inkom, Bannock County, Idaho
  - coordinates: 42°47′40″N 112°15′28″W
  - elevation: 4,518 ft (1,377 m)
- Length: 56 mi (90 km)

Marsh Creek is a 56-mile-long (90 km) tributary of the Portneuf River in Bannock County, Idaho, United States.

== Description ==
Beginning at an elevation of 5,157 feet (1,572 m) near Red Rock Pass, Marsh Creek flows generally north near the communities of Downey and Arimo. It parallels the Portneuf River starting near McCammon, reaching its mouth near Inkom, at an elevation of 4,518 feet (1,377 m). It is roughly paralleled by Interstate 15/U.S. Route 91 in Idaho for most of its length.

== See also ==
- List of rivers of Idaho
- List of longest streams of Idaho
