= Steamchet Creek =

Stream in the state of Idaho

Coordinates: 47°37′06″N 116°44′36″W

Steamchet Creek is a stream in Kootenai County, Idaho, in the United States. It flows into Lake Coeur d'Alene.

Steamchet is a name derived from the Coeur d'Alene language meaning "older daughter".

== See also ==
- List of rivers of Idaho
