= Little Owyhee River =

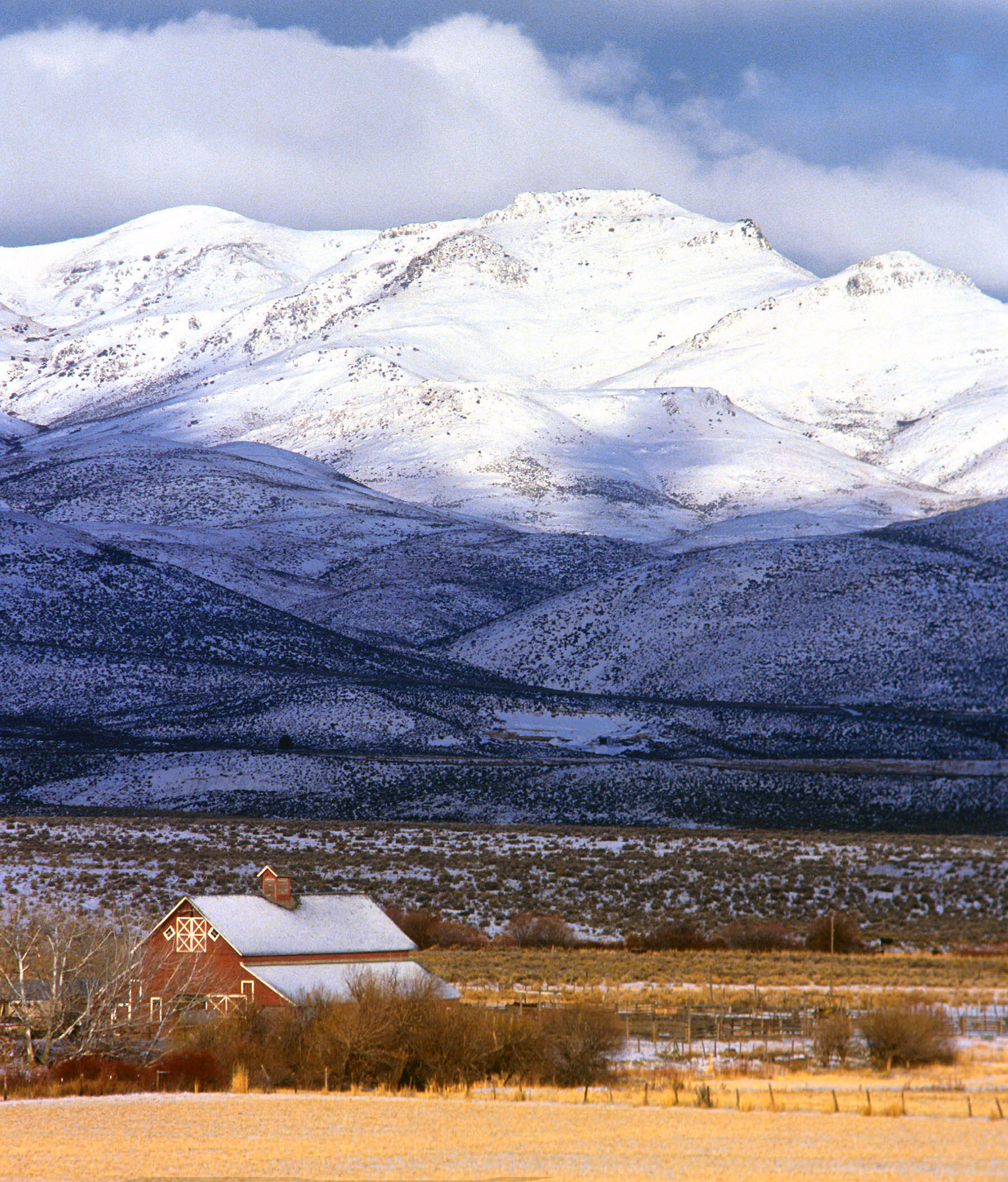
- Much of the Little Owyhee River's water comes from the Owyhee Mountain range

- Location of the mouth of the Little Owyhee River in Idaho Little Owyhee River (the United States)

Location
- Country: United States
- State: Nevada, Idaho
- Counties: Humboldt County, Nevada, Elko County, Nevada, Owyhee County, Idaho

Physical characteristics
- Source
  - location: east of the Santa Rosa Range, Humboldt County, Nevada
  - coordinates: 41°48′30″N 117°17′03″W
  - elevation: 6,739 ft (2,054 m)
- Mouth: South Fork Owyhee River
  - location: Owyhee County, Idaho
  - coordinates: 42°10′03″N 116°52′19″W
  - elevation: 4,363 ft (1,330 m)
- Length: 61 mi (98 km)

The Little Owyhee River is a 61-mile (98 km) long tributary of the South Fork Owyhee River. Beginning at an elevation of 6,739 feet (2,054 m) east of the Santa Rosa Range in eastern Humboldt County, Nevada, it flows generally east into Elko County, Nevada and the Owyhee Desert. From there, it flows north into Owyhee County, Idaho and reaches its mouth at an elevation of 4,363 feet (1,330 m).

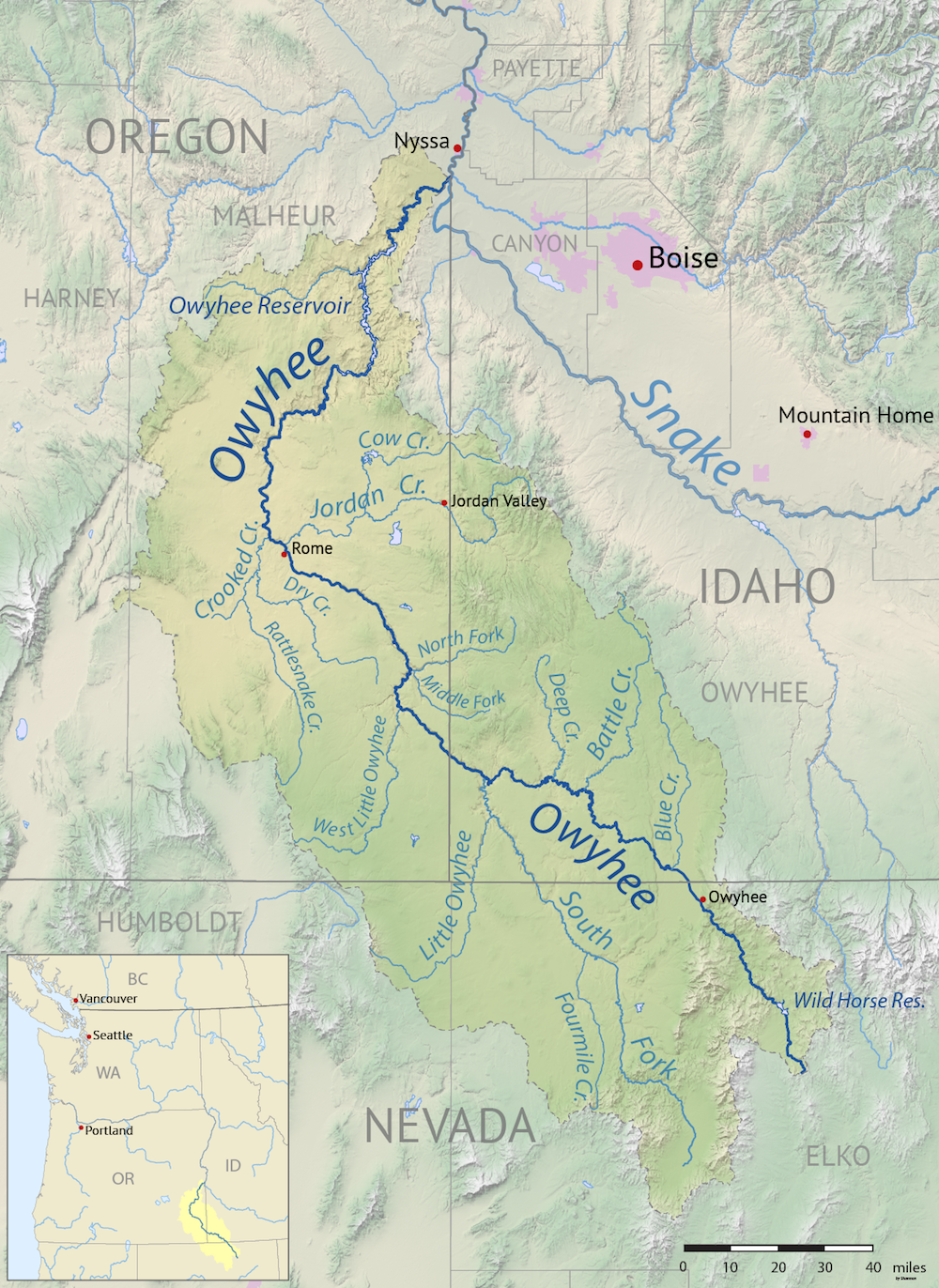
Map of the Little Owyhee River flowing north through Nevada into Idaho where it joins the South Fork of the Owyhee before joining the main river.

== See also ==
- List of rivers of Nevada
- List of rivers of Idaho
- List of longest streams of Idaho
