= North Fork Salmon River =

- Location of the mouth of the North Fork Salmon River in Idaho North Fork Salmon River (the United States)

Location
- Country: United States
- State: Idaho

Physical characteristics
- Source: Lewis and Clark Ridge
  - coordinates: 45°42′02″N 113°58′29″W
  - elevation: 7,960 ft (2,430 m)
- Mouth: Salmon River
  - coordinates: 45°24′19″N 113°59′41″W
  - elevation: 3,625 ft (1,105 m)
- Length: 24 mi (39 km)
- Basin size: 211 sq mi (550 km^{2})
- Discharge
  - location: North Fork
  - average: 90.4 cu ft/s (2.56 m^{3}/s)
  - minimum: 28 cu ft/s (0.79 m^{3}/s)
  - maximum: 901 cu ft/s (25.5 m^{3}/s)

The North Fork Salmon River is a 24-mile (39 km) tributary of the Salmon River, flowing through east-central Idaho in the United States. It joins the Salmon River about 20 miles (32 km) north of the town of Salmon, in Lemhi County.

== See also ==
- List of rivers of Idaho
