= Logan River (Utah-Idaho) =

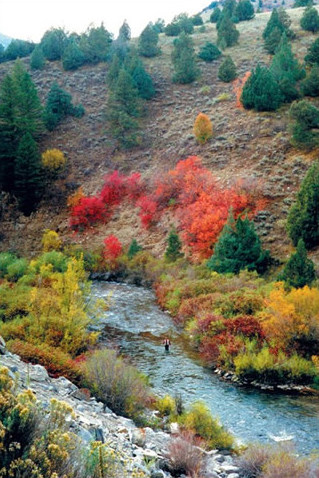
- Logan River in the Wasatch-Cache National Forest

- Location of the mouth of the Logan River in Utah Logan River (Utah-Idaho) (the United States)

Location
- Country: United States
- State: Utah, Idaho
- Counties: Cache County, Utah, Franklin County, Idaho

Physical characteristics
- Source
  - location: east of Preston, Franklin County, Idaho
  - coordinates: 42°02′07″N 111°35′58″W
  - elevation: 8,096 ft (2,468 m)
- Mouth: Little Bear River
  - location: west of Logan, Cache County, Utah
  - coordinates: 41°44′29″N 111°57′17″W
  - elevation: 4,413 ft (1,345 m)
- Length: 54 mi (87 km)

The Logan River is a 53.7-mile-long (86.4 km) tributary of the Little Bear River in Utah, the United States. It is currently being studied to determine whether it is suitable for National Wild and Scenic Rivers designation.

== Course ==
The Logan River rises in the Bear River Mountains in Idaho and flows south, then southwest through Logan Canyon and the Wasatch-Cache National Forest to the city of Logan, Utah, in the Cache Valley. In this valley, it joins the Little Bear River a few miles west of Logan and about 5 miles (8 km) south of where the Little Bear River joins the Bear River.

The river is dammed at the 1st, 2nd, and 3rd dams at the mouth of Logan Canyon.

== See also ==
- List of rivers of Utah
- List of rivers of Idaho
- List of longest streams of Idaho
