= Indian Creek (Boise River tributary) =

Stream in Canyon, Elmore, and Ada counties in Idaho, United States

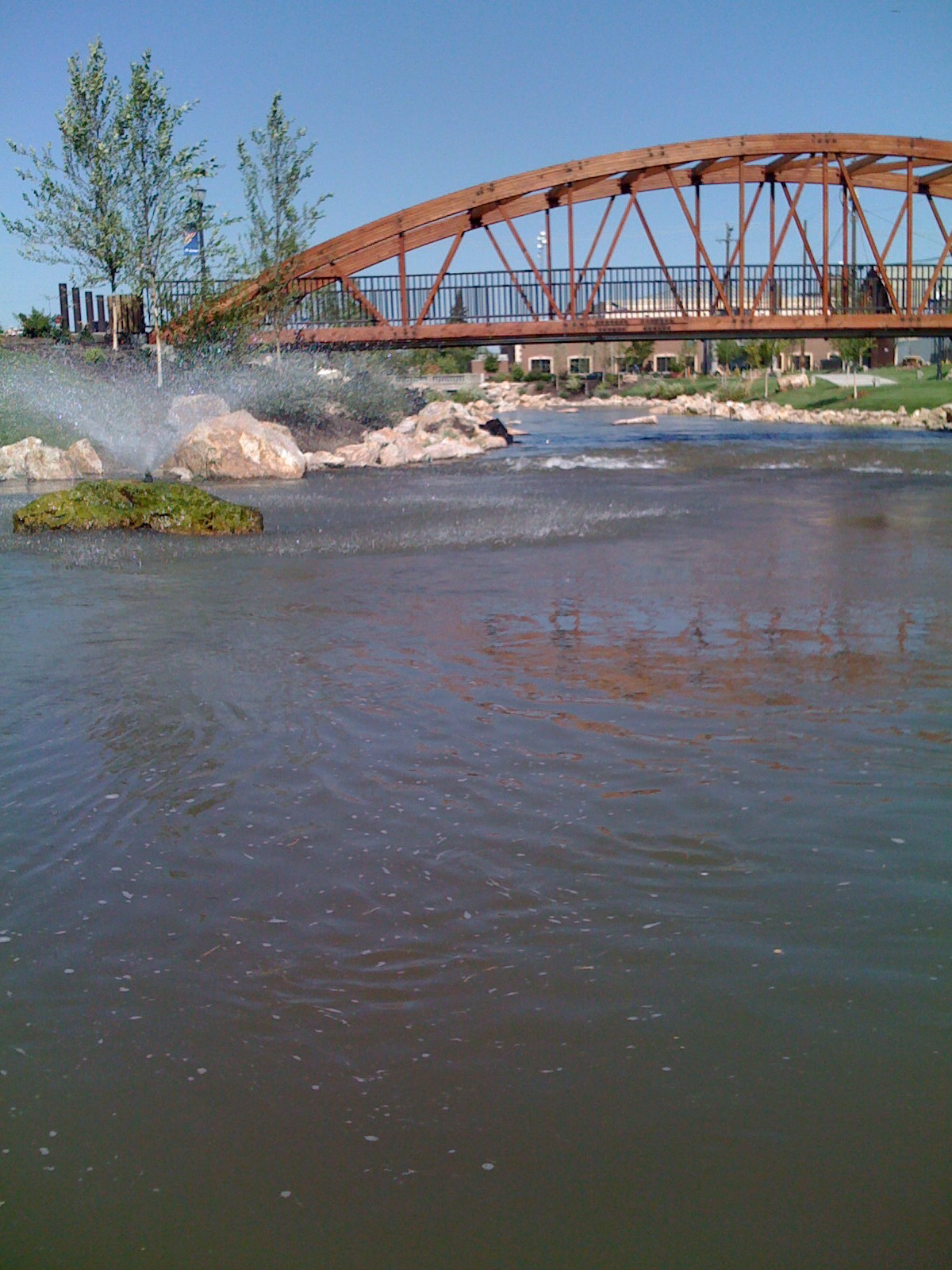
- Indian Creek in Caldwell, August 2008

- Location of the mouth of Indian Creek in Idaho Indian Creek (Boise River tributary) (the United States)

Location
- Country: United States
- State: Idaho
- Counties: Ada, Canyon, Elmore

Physical characteristics
- Source
  - location: south of Arrowrock Reservoir, Elmore County, Idaho
  - coordinates: 43°25′53″N 115°46′49″W
  - elevation: 5,047 ft (1,538 m)
- Mouth: Boise River
  - location: Caldwell, Canyon County, Idaho
  - coordinates: 43°40′39″N 116°42′19″W
  - elevation: 2,349 ft (716 m)
- Length: 66 mi (106 km)
- Basin size: 295 sq mi (760 km^{2})

Indian Creek is a 66-mile (106 km) long tributary of the Boise River in Canyon, Elmore, and Ada counties in Idaho, United States.

== River course ==
Beginning at an elevation of 5,047 feet (1,538 m) south of Arrowrock Reservoir and north of Mayfield in western Elmore County, it flows west into Ada County and through the town of Kuna.

Indian Creek is dammed at Indian Creek Reservoir, visible from the I-84 freeway east of Boise. Below the reservoir the creek is mostly dry, but several more small dams pick up the small drainage to form stock or irrigation ponds.

Kuna Section:

East of Kuna near Eagle Rd, the New York Canal fills the creek bed between March and October, creating its largest free-flowing section. This section is often used by floaters, and runs through the town of Kuna, next to parks and a short green belt path. West of Kuna near Columbia Rd, the water is diverted back into the lower section of the New York Canal, which flows west into Lake Lowell. The creek bed continues to the northwest.

The creek bed fills again from local drainage as it flows northwest into Canyon County, through Nampa, and then Caldwell, where it flows past the Indian Creek Plaza, before continuing north to its mouth, where it joins the Boise River. At an elevation of 2,349 feet (716.0 m). Indian Creek has a 295-square-mile (764 km^{2}) watershed.

== See also ==
- List of rivers of Idaho
- List of longest streams of Idaho
