= Union Flat Creek =

- Location of the mouth of Union Flat Creek in Washington

Location
- Country: United States
- State: Washington (state), Idaho
- Counties: Whitman County, Washington, Nez Perce County, Idaho

Physical characteristics
- Source
  - location: near Genesee, Nez Perce County, Idaho
  - coordinates: 46°31′20″N 116°57′35″W
  - elevation: 2,820 ft (860 m)
- Mouth: Palouse River
  - location: west of La Crosse, Whitman County, Washington
  - coordinates: 46°49′38″N 117°59′55″W
  - elevation: 1,168 ft (356 m)
- Length: 72 mi (116 km)

Union Flat Creek is a 72-mile (120 km) long tributary of the Palouse River. Beginning at an elevation of 2,820 feet (859.5 m) near Genesee in northern Nez Perce County, Idaho, it flows west into Whitman County, Washington, passing through the towns of Uniontown and Colton. It then flows to its mouth west of La Crosse, at an elevation of 1,168 feet (356.0 m).

== See also ==
- List of rivers of Washington (state)
- List of rivers of Idaho
- List of longest streams of Idaho
