= Goose Creek (Snake River tributary) =

River in Idaho, Nevada, and Utah in the United States

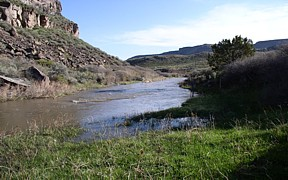
- Goose Creek near Oakley, Idaho

- Location of the mouth of Goose Creek in Idaho Goose Creek (the United States)

Location
- Country: United States
- State: Idaho, Nevada, Utah
- Counties: Cassia County, Idaho, Elko County, Nevada, Box Elder County, Utah

Physical characteristics
- Source
  - location: Cassia Division of the Sawtooth National Forest, Cassia County, Idaho
  - coordinates: 42°10′29″N 114°17′31″W
  - elevation: 7,239 ft (2,206 m)
- Mouth: Snake River
  - location: near Burley, Cassia County, Idaho
  - coordinates: 42°32′37″N 113°45′47″W
  - elevation: 4,137 ft (1,261 m)
- Length: 123 mi (198 km)
- Basin size: 1,120 sq mi (2,900 km^{2})

Goose Creek is a 123-mile (198 km) long tributary of the Snake River.

== Description ==
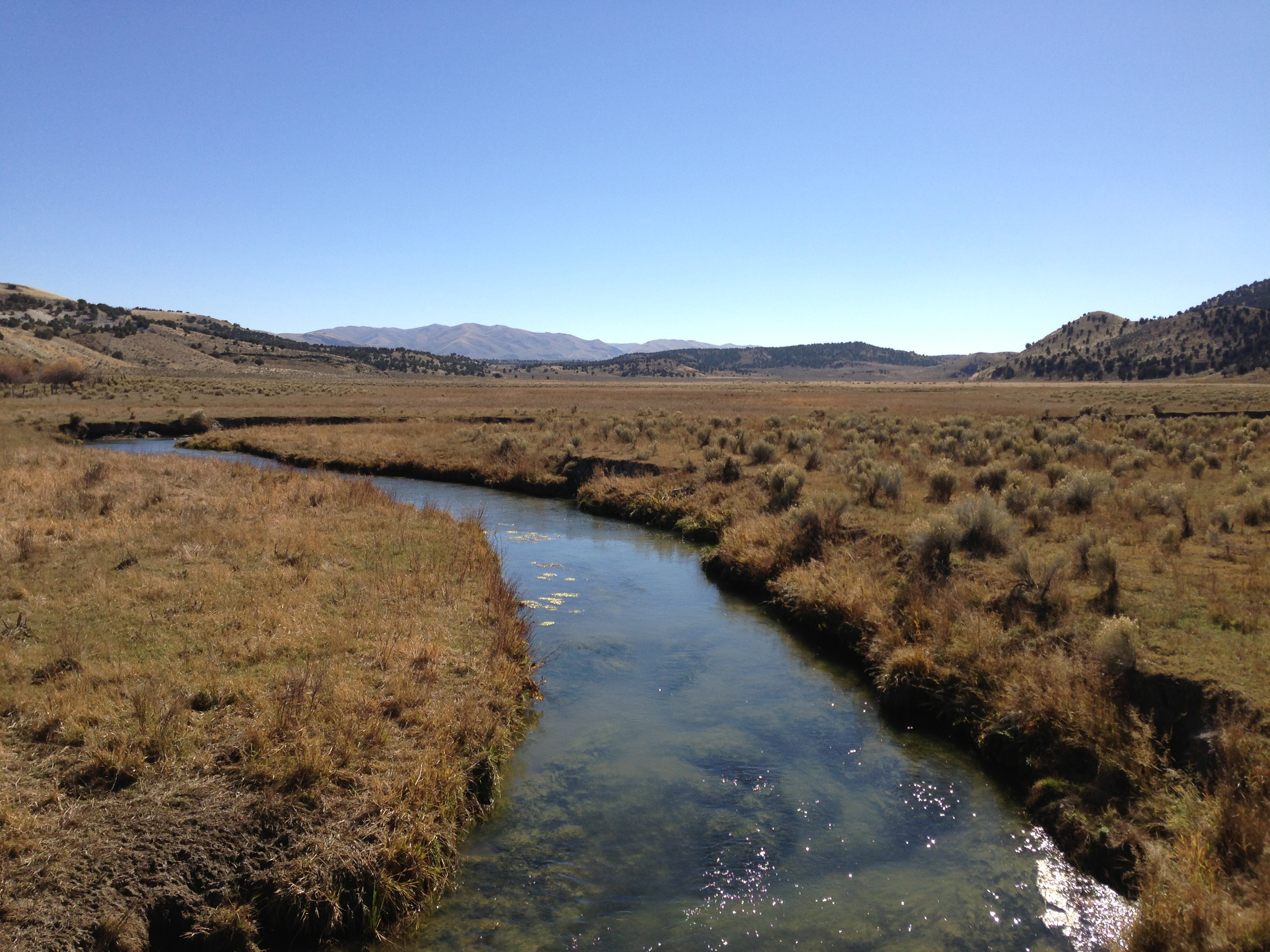
Goose Creek in Elko County, Nevada, October 2014

Beginning at an elevation of 7,239 feet (2,206 m) in the Cassia Division of the Sawtooth National Forest in southwestern Cassia County, Idaho, it flows south into Elko County, Nevada, and loops back around into Cassia County, briefly crossing Box Elder County, Utah, in the process. It is impounded by Oakley Dam several miles south of Oakley, Idaho, forming Lower Goose Creek Reservoir. All of the creek's water is stored for irrigation, so its channel from the reservoir to its mouth near Burley, Idaho, is dry and largely obliterated by agriculture. Goose Creek has a 1,120-square-mile (2,901 km^{2}) watershed. The California Trail followed Goose Creek from a point just north of the Idaho/Utah border southwest across northwestern Utah to Little Goose Creek in northeastern Elko County, Nevada.

The stream was named for the geese along its course. The stream gives its name to the Goose Creek Mountains.

== See also ==
- List of rivers of Idaho
- List of longest streams of Idaho
- List of rivers of Nevada
- List of rivers of Utah
