= Portneuf River (Idaho) =

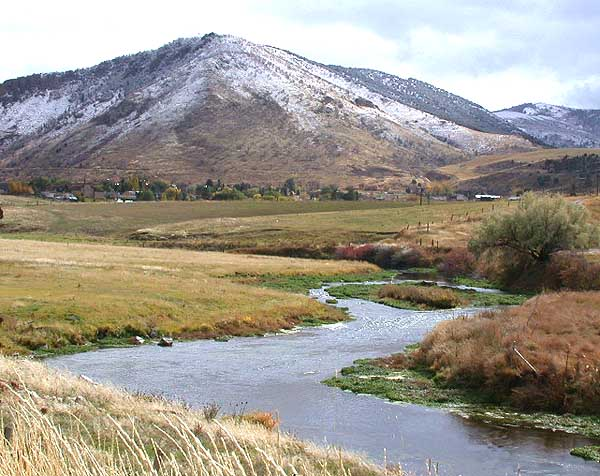
- The Portneuf River, as seen from U.S. Route 30 west of Lava Hot Springs, October 2004

- Location of the mouth of the Portneuf River Portneuf River (Idaho) (the United States)

Location
- Country: United States
- State: Idaho
- Counties: Bannock, Caribou, Bingham, & Power

Physical characteristics
- Source
  - location: north of Chesterfield, Bingham County
  - coordinates: 43°06′10″N 112°00′13″W
  - elevation: 6,253 ft (1,906 m)
- Mouth: Snake River
  - location: American Falls Reservoir, Bannock/Power counties
  - coordinates: 42°57′06″N 112°45′02″W
  - elevation: 4,357 ft (1,328 m)
- Length: 124 mi (200 km)
- Basin size: 1,329 sq mi (3,440 km^{2})
- Discharge
  - location: at Tyhee
  - average: 418 cu ft/s (11.8 m^{3}/s)
  - minimum: 32 cu ft/s (0.91 m^{3}/s)
  - maximum: 1,730 cu ft/s (49 m^{3}/s)

The Portneuf River is a 124-mile-long (200 km) tributary of the Snake River in southeastern Idaho, United States. It drains a ranching and farming valley in the mountains southeast of the Snake River Plain. The city of Pocatello sits along the river near its emergence from the mountains onto the Snake River Plain.

The river is part of the Columbia River Basin.

== Course ==
The Portneuf River rises in western Caribou County, approximately 25 miles (40 km) east of Pocatello, along the eastern side of the Portneuf Range. It flows initially south, passing westward around the southern end of the 60-mile (100 km) range, and then turning north to flow between the Portneuf Range to the east and the Bannock Range to the west. It flows northwest through downtown Pocatello and enters the Snake at the northeast corner of American Falls Reservoir, approximately 10 miles (16 km) northwest of Pocatello.

== Watershed and discharge ==
The Portneuf watershed drains 850,290 acres (3,441.0 km^{2}) in southeastern Idaho and is bounded by Malad Summit to the south, the Bannock Range to the west, the Portneuf Range to the southeast, and the Chesterfield Range to the northeast. Marsh Creek is the only major tributary to the Portneuf River. Other creeks in this watershed include Mink, Rapid, Garden, Hawkins, Birch, Dempsey, Pebble, Twentyfourmile, and Toponce creeks. The total area of the Chesterfield Reservoir is estimated at 1,236 acres (500 ha).

The Portneuf River's drainage basin is approximately 1,329 square miles (3,442 km^{2}) in area.

Its mean annual discharge, as measured by USGS gauge 13075910 (Portneuf River at Tyhee), is 418 cubic feet per second (11.8 m^{3}/s), with a maximum daily recorded flow of 1,730 cu ft/s (49.0 m^{3}/s) and a minimum of 32 cu ft/s (0.906 m^{3}/s).

== History ==
The Portneuf River was given its name sometime before 1821 by French Canadian voyageurs working for the Montreal-based fur trading North West Company.

The valley of the Portneuf provided the route of the Oregon Trail and California Trail in the middle 19th century. After the discovery of gold in Montana and Idaho, it became a significant stage route for the transportation of people and goods. In 1877 the valley was used as the route of the Utah and Northern Railway, the first railroad in Idaho.

== Biogeochemistry of the watershed ==
The Portneuf River watershed is a heavily used and anthropogenically altered system. After a series of heavy floods in the early 1960s the Army Corps of Engineers designed and constructed a concrete channel to control flooding in 1965. The channelization followed the river's route and cut through the west side of Pocatello, drastically altering the natural river processes. One common result of human activity is the loading of nutrients into the water system through both point and non-point sources. The river is subjected to use by four municipalities (Lava Hot Springs, McCammon, Inkom, and Pocatello) over its length. The dynamic geology of the region and the heavy use by the local populations have produced a unique set of chemical characteristics associated with both the biological processes and the interactions with the local geology.

=== Nitrates ===
Nutrient runoffs from intensive agriculture and ranching along the route of the river have noticeably increased the nitrate loads in the stream. This is compounded by the addition of treated effluent from the city of Pocatello's wastewater treatment facility and the waste associated with the phosphate processing plant, Simplot. This increased nutrient load supports an increased biomass within the system. The DEQ in collaboration with the City of Pocatello, the Soil Conservation Commission, and USDA are developing tools and practices designed specifically to alleviate the nitrogen issues associated with agriculture and its waste. Known as Best Management Practices (BMPs), these methodologies are designed and modified for varying situations and have proven themselves effective through prior implementation projects.

=== Carbon exchange ===
The exchange of inorganic carbon between the solid earth and the atmosphere in the Portneuf watershed has produced deposits of CaCO_{3} throughout the system. Known as travertine and tufa, these deposits are formed as a function of the dynamic groundwater and geology of the region. Tufa is known throughout the geologic collective as the soft and porous CaCO_{3} deposits associated with moving freshwater environments. Travertine is a related deposit separated by the fact that it is associated with thermal waters. Deposition of tufa is complex, involving processes of dissolution, saturation, subsurface transport, emergence and precipitation. Both versions of precipitated CaCO_{3} are present in the Portneuf watershed. Several very different but related processes control the precipitation of CaCO_{3} in natural aqueous systems. The chemical processes are driven by the chemical properties of the elements and molecules involved. The physical processes are driven by characteristics of the watershed system (gradient, flow, substrate, groundwater flow properties). The biotic processes are driven by the activities of living organisms.

==== Chemical processes ====
Calcium carbonate formations are associated with regions where meteoric waters become enriched with calcium carbonate by direct dissolution of CaCO_{3}-rich rocks underground only to resurface and re-precipitate calcite. It is well known that the geology of the Portneuf watershed contains large thicknesses of limestone and dolomite strata that are mostly Paleozoic. Enrichment of CaCO_{3} in the meteoric waters is due to the addition of CO_{2} either through interaction with the atmosphere, or infiltrating through organic compound containing soil layers. This saturation of CO_{2} in the groundwater allows for the dissolution of carbonate rocks as it drives pH down. As the water reemerges it is exposed to the atmosphere and the concentration gradient of CO_{2} associated with it. As the enriched waters attempt to achieve equilibrium they precipitate calcite, through the reaction of Ca^{+2} + 2HCO^{−} ⇔ CO_{2}↑ + H_{2}O+ CaCO_{3}↓. The mountains surrounding the Portneuf are characterized by thick Paleozoic limestone deposits rich in carbonates, and many springs do emerge along the reach associated with Lava Hot Springs.

==== Physical processes ====
Another factor affecting the precipitation of tufa is the physical aspects of the river system. The gradient of the Portneuf through Lava Hot Springs is such that this reach is dominated by a series of riffles with some larger falls. This turbulence and increased surface area caused by aeration facilitate the out gassing of CO_{2}, thus increasing the saturation of CaCO_{3} to the point of precipitation. This is a phenomenon noticed throughout the world as the development of waterfall tufa and is a relevant explanation for at least some formation through the region, especially through the town site of Lava Hot Springs. The figure below is a schematic representation of the stream gradient of the Portneuf from just below Chesterfield Reservoir and above American Falls Reservoir adapted from Minshall, 1973.

==== Biotic processes ====
The third recognized mechanism for tufa development is the active role played by the biota. Algae and mosses, along with higher plants and some insects, often trap tiny particles within their sinuous roots, fronds, and shelter/feeding structures, acting as nucleation points for further precipitation. This may explain some of the deposition locations, but the biota plays a larger role as photosynthetic plants remove CO_{2} from the water, further concentrating the Ca^{2+} and CO_{3}^{2−} and driving precipitation. The Portneuf through this reach is rich in plant life not only due to the nutrient accumulation as it travels through farmland but from the warm water inputs that protect the stream from the effects of the harsh cold of winter temperatures. This could be a mechanism for potentially increasing tufa formation through the reach. An interesting study completed in 1972 showed evidence that the development of tufa and travertine filled the interstices normally found on the rocky river. This had implications for some burrowing organisms as well as nutrient cycling.

Precipitation of tufa in the Portneuf drainage is produced through the combination of four complex mechanisms: dissolution of limestones by meteoric waters containing carbonic acids, degassing of CO_{2} at turbulent sites, the removal of CO_{2} by photosynthetic plants, and the trapping of particles of CaCO_{3} by the biota. The complex interactions between these different mechanisms may never be fully understood but offer insight into the occurrence of formations.

== See also ==
- List of rivers of Idaho
- List of longest streams of Idaho
- Tributaries of the Columbia River
