= Orofino Creek =

Stream in the U.S. state of Idaho

Coordinates: 46°28′34″N 116°15′18″W

Orofino Creek is a stream in the U.S. state of Idaho.

Variant names were "Oro Fino Creek" and "Oro Fino River". The creek was named for gold mining along its course, oro fino meaning "pure gold" in Spanish.
