= Tower Creek =

Stream in Idaho, U.S.

Coordinates: 45°19′12″N 113°54′30″W

Tower Creek is a stream in the U.S. state of Idaho. It is a tributary of the Salmon River.

Tower Creek was named for towering rock formations along its course. A variant name was "Boyle Creek".
