= Little Bear River (Utah) =

River in Utah, United States

Coordinates: 41°30′15″N 111°48′54″W

The Little Bear River is a 36.4-mile-long (58.6 km) tributary of the Bear River in northern Utah in the United States. It rises in the mountains east of Brigham City, where three forks (West, South, and East) join at Avon, then flows north to Paradise. At Paradise, it spills out into the broad flats of Cache Valley, passing north by Hyrum, where it is impounded by the Hyrum Reservoir, then meandering generally west by Wellsville. It meanders north again, receiving the Logan River in the Cutler Marsh and eventually draining into the Bear River. However, the junction is now submerged by the Cutler Reservoir.

== See also ==
- List of rivers of Utah
