= North Fork Owyhee Wilderness =

Wilderness area in Idaho, United States

- IUCN category Ib (wilderness area)
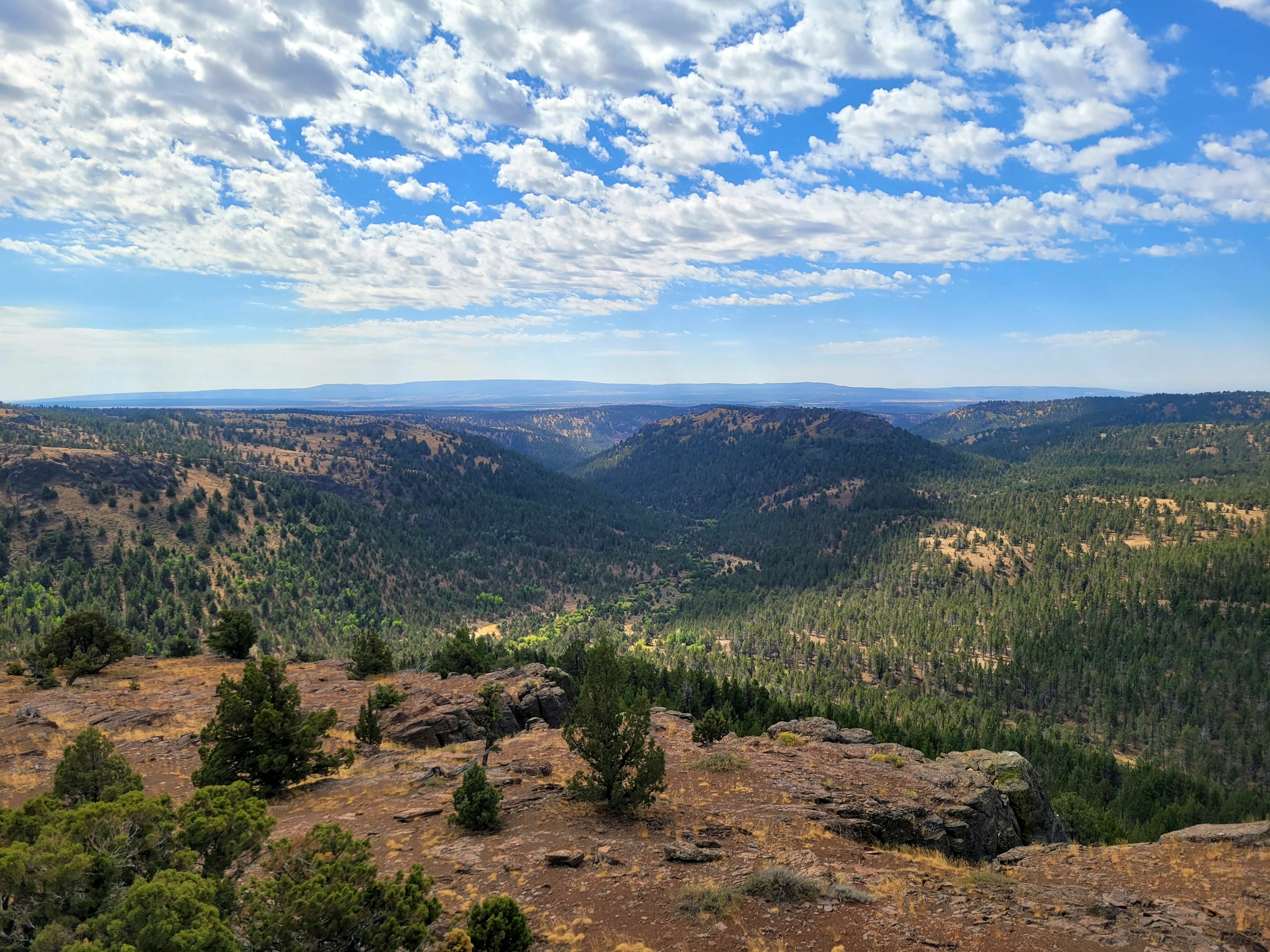

- Location within the United States
- Location: Owyhee County, Idaho, USA
- Nearest city: Boise, Idaho
- Coordinates: 42°40′26″N 116°45′33″W
- Area: 43,413 acres (17,569 ha)
- Established: 2009
- Governing body: Bureau of Land Management

The North Fork Owyhee Wilderness is on the high basalt plateaus of Owyhee County in southwestern Idaho in the western United States. The rivers within it offer whitewater rapids up to Class IV. The upper 20.8 miles (33.5 km) of the North Fork Owyhee River, from the Idaho–Oregon border to the upstream boundary of the wilderness, are part of the National Wild and Scenic Rivers System. Of this total, 15.1 miles (24.3 km) are classified as wild and the remaining 5.7 miles (9.2 km) are classified "recreational".

== Geography ==
The North Fork Owyhee Wilderness has canyons over 1,000 feet (300 m) deep, sagebrush, and grassland plateaus. These canyons in Owyhee County have been called "the largest concentration of sheer-walled volcanic rhyolite and basalt canyons in the western United States".

== Legislative history ==
The North Fork Owyhee Wilderness was created by the Omnibus Public Land Management Act of 2009 and signed into law by President Barack Obama on March 30, 2009. Also created in the Omnibus Land Act were five additional southwestern Idaho wilderness areas in Owyhee County, collectively known as the Owyhee Canyonlands Wilderness Areas:

- Big Jacks Creek Wilderness - 52,826 acres (21,378 ha)
- Bruneau – Jarbidge Rivers Wilderness - 89,996 acres (36,420 ha)
- Little Jacks Creek Wilderness - 50,929 acres (20,610 ha)
- Owyhee River Wilderness - 267,328 acres (108,184 ha)
- Pole Creek Wilderness - 12,533 acres (5,072 ha)

The Act of 2009 added 517,025 acres (209,233 ha) of wilderness within the state of Idaho.

Wilderness areas do not allow motorized or mechanical equipment including bicycles. Although camping and fishing are allowed with proper permit, no roads or buildings are constructed and there is also no logging or mining, in compliance with the 1964 Wilderness Act. Wilderness areas within National Forests and Bureau of Land Management areas also allow hunting in season.

== Natural history ==
The North Fork Owyhee Wilderness lies within the Owyhee Desert, part of the northern Basin and Range ecoregion, although hydrologically the wilderness area is within the Snake River – Columbia River drainage. The area is home to mule deer, pronghorn, bighorn sheep, sage grouse, hawks, eagles, falcons, plus many songbirds, as well as numerous rare plants.

== See also ==
- List of largest wilderness areas in the United States
- List of U.S. Wilderness Areas
- Wilderness Act
