= Big Jacks Creek Wilderness =

Wilderness area in Idaho, United States

- IUCN category Ib (wilderness area)
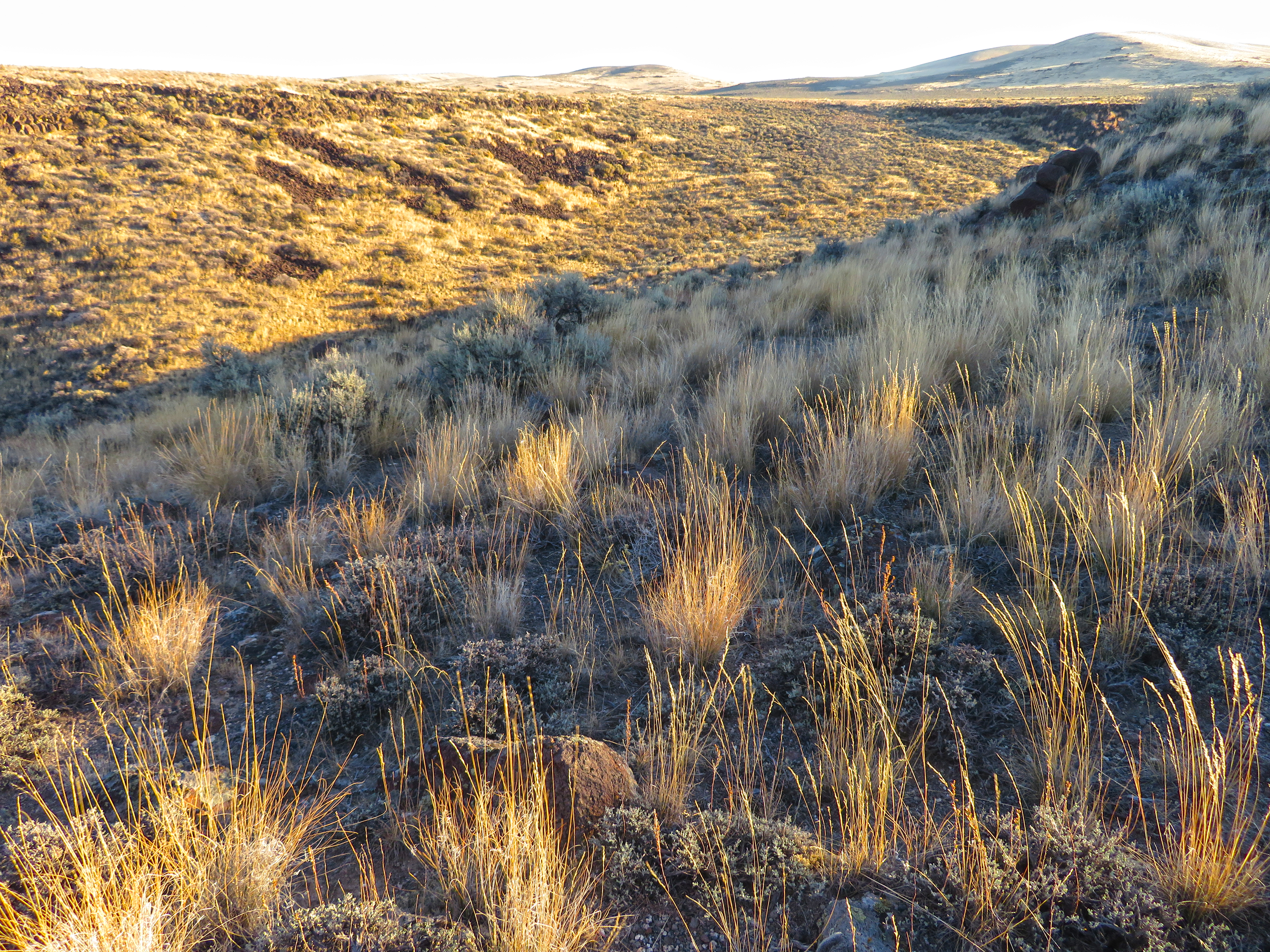

- Location within the United States
- Location: Owyhee County, Idaho, USA
- Nearest city: Boise, Idaho
- Coordinates: 42°27′43″N 116°4′46″W
- Area: 52,826 acres (21,378 ha)
- Established: 2009
- Governing body: Bureau of Land Management

The Big Jacks Creek Wilderness is located on the high basalt plateaus of Owyhee County in southwestern Idaho in the western United States. Little Jacks Creek Wilderness is on its northwest border. About 35 miles (56 km) of Big Jacks Creek is classified as a wild river.

== Geography ==
Elevation varies from 2,808 to 5,872 ft (856–1,790 m) with canyons that are as much as 655 ft (200 m) deep that are covered in several varieties of sagebrush. The Creek flows north into the Bruneau River, which in turn flows into the Snake River.

== Legislative history ==
The Big Jacks Creek Wilderness was created by the Omnibus Public Land Management Act of 2009 and signed into law by President Barack Obama on March 30, 2009. Also created in the Omnibus Land Act were five additional southwestern Idaho wilderness areas in Owyhee County, collectively known as the Owyhee Canyonlands Wilderness Areas:

- Bruneau–Jarbidge Rivers Wilderness - 89,996 acres (36,420 ha)
- Little Jacks Creek Wilderness - 50,929 acres (20,610 ha)
- North Fork Owyhee Wilderness - 43,413 acres (17,569 ha)
- Owyhee River Wilderness - 267,328 acres (108,184 ha)
- Pole Creek Wilderness - 12,533 acres (5,072 ha)

The Act of 2009 added 517,025 acres (209,233 ha) of wilderness within the state of Idaho.

Wilderness areas do not allow motorized or mechanical equipment including bicycles. Although camping and fishing are allowed with proper permit, no roads or buildings are constructed and there is also no logging or mining, in compliance with the 1964 Wilderness Act. Wilderness areas within National Forests and Bureau of Land Management areas also allow hunting in season.

== Natural history ==
The Big Jacks Creek Wilderness lies within the Owyhee Desert, part of the northern Basin and Range ecoregion, although hydrologically the wilderness area is within the Snake River – Columbia River drainage. The area is home to Columbia River redband trout, mountain quail, bighorn sheep, and two species of sensitive plants. Other plants found are black sagebrush, low sagebrush, Thurber needlegrass, Idaho fescue, bluebunch wheatgrass, bud sagebrush, Indian ricegrass, willow, rose, currant, and sedge.

== See also ==
- List of largest wilderness areas in the United States
- List of U.S. Wilderness Areas
- Wilderness Act
