= Little Jacks Creek Wilderness =

Wilderness area in Idaho, United States

- IUCN category Ib (wilderness area)
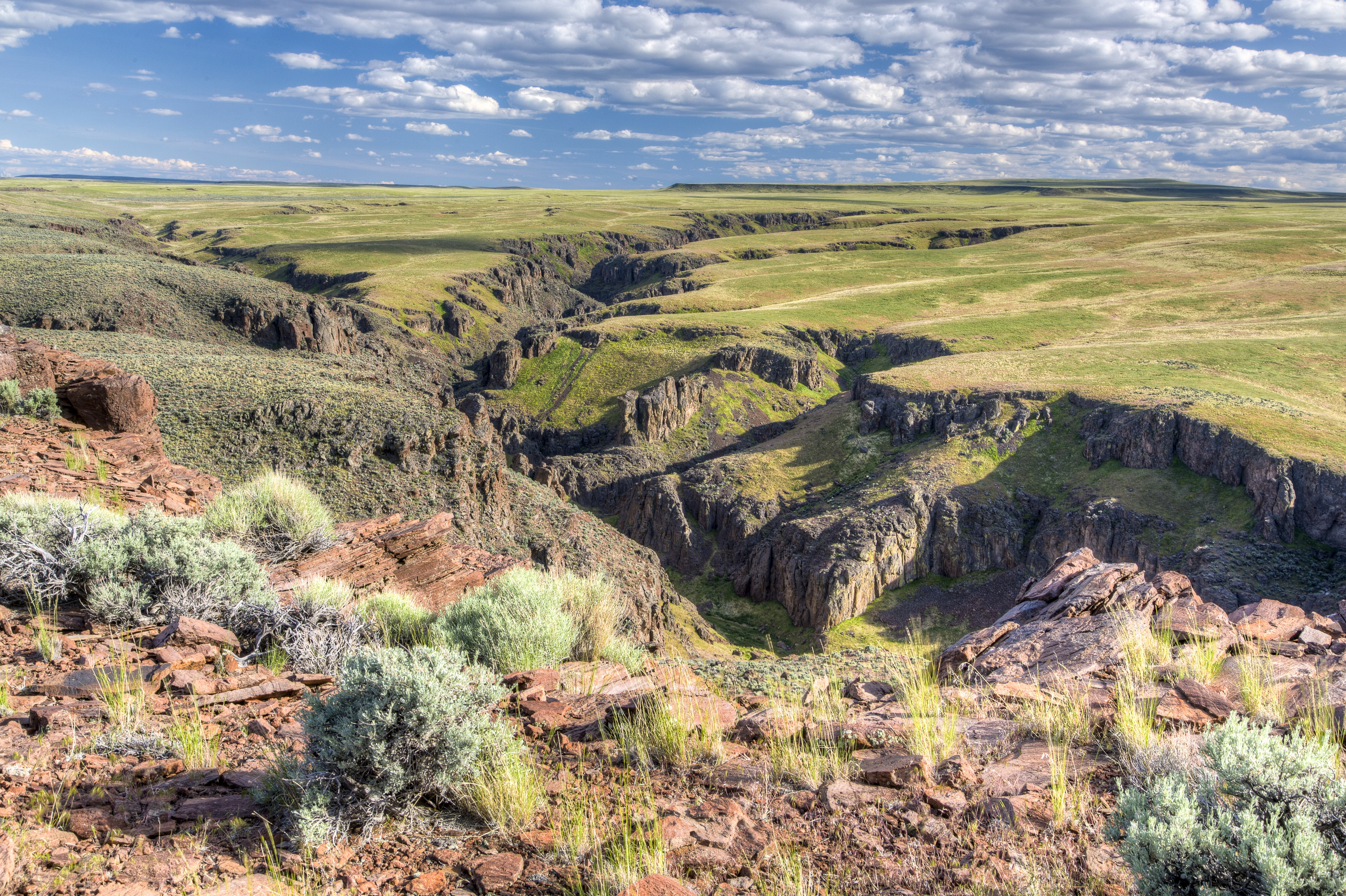

- Location within the United States
- Location: Owyhee County, Idaho, USA
- Nearest city: Boise, Idaho
- Coordinates: 42°41′40″N 116°13′49″W
- Area: 50,929 acres (20,610 ha)
- Established: 2009
- Governing body: Bureau of Land Management

The Little Jacks Creek Wilderness is located on the high basalt plateaus of Owyhee County in southwestern Idaho in the western United States. Big Jacks Creek Wilderness is on its southeast border. About 12.4 miles (20.0 km) of Little Jacks Creek is classified as a wild river.

== Geography ==
The Little Jacks Creek Wilderness has rugged canyons, streams, and plateaus. It has red rhyollite and a large brown basalt dome covered with grass and sagebrush. There are several spots where river canyons are 1,000 feet (300 m) deep.

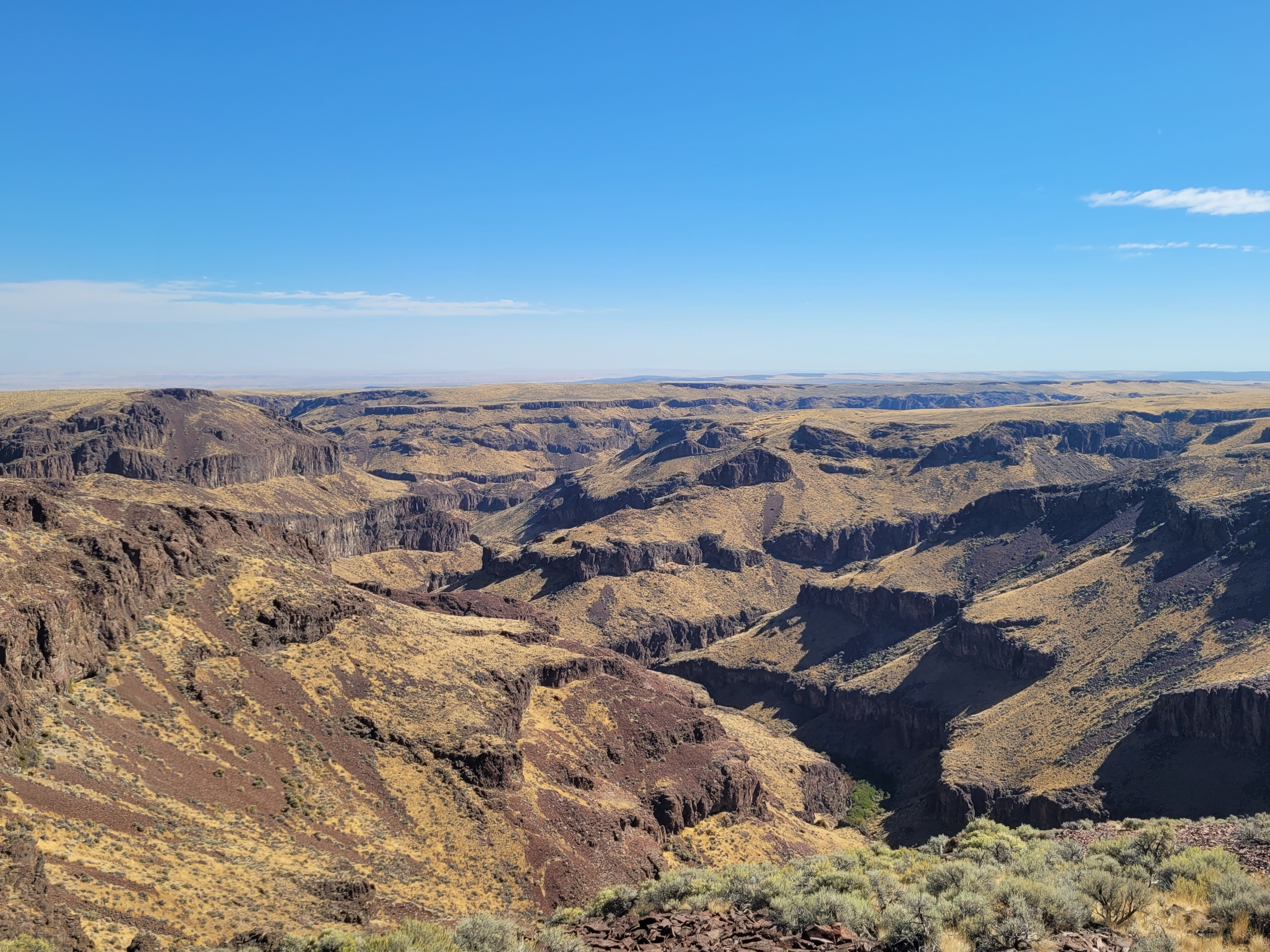
One of the many canyons located in the wilderness area.

== Legislative history ==
The Little Jacks Creek Wilderness was created by the Omnibus Public Land Management Act of 2009 and signed into law by President Barack Obama on March 30, 2009. Also created in the Omnibus Land Act were five additional southwestern Idaho wilderness areas in Owyhee County, collectively known as the Owyhee Canyonlands Wilderness Areas:

- Bruneau–Jarbidge Rivers Wilderness - 89,996 acres (36,420 ha)
- Big Jacks Creek Wilderness - 52,826 acres (21,378 ha)
- North Fork Owyhee Wilderness - 43,413 acres (17,569 ha)
- Owyhee River Wilderness - 267,328 acres (108,184 ha)
- Pole Creek Wilderness - 12,533 acres (5,072 ha)

The Act of 2009 added 517,025 acres (209,233 ha) of wilderness within the state of Idaho.

Wilderness areas do not allow motorized or mechanical equipment including bicycles. Although camping and fishing are allowed with proper permit, no roads or buildings are constructed and there is also no logging or mining, in compliance with the 1964 Wilderness Act. Wilderness areas within National Forests and Bureau of Land Management areas also allow hunting in season.

== Natural history ==
The Little Jacks Creek Wilderness lies within the Owyhee Desert, part of the northern Basin and Range ecoregion, although hydrologically the wilderness area is within the Snake River – Columbia River drainage. The area is home to mountain quail, mule deer, Columbia River redband trout, and sage grouse.

== See also ==
- List of largest wilderness areas in the United States
- List of U.S. Wilderness Areas
- Wilderness Act
