= Owyhee River Wilderness =

Wilderness area in Idaho, United States

- IUCN category Ib (wilderness area)
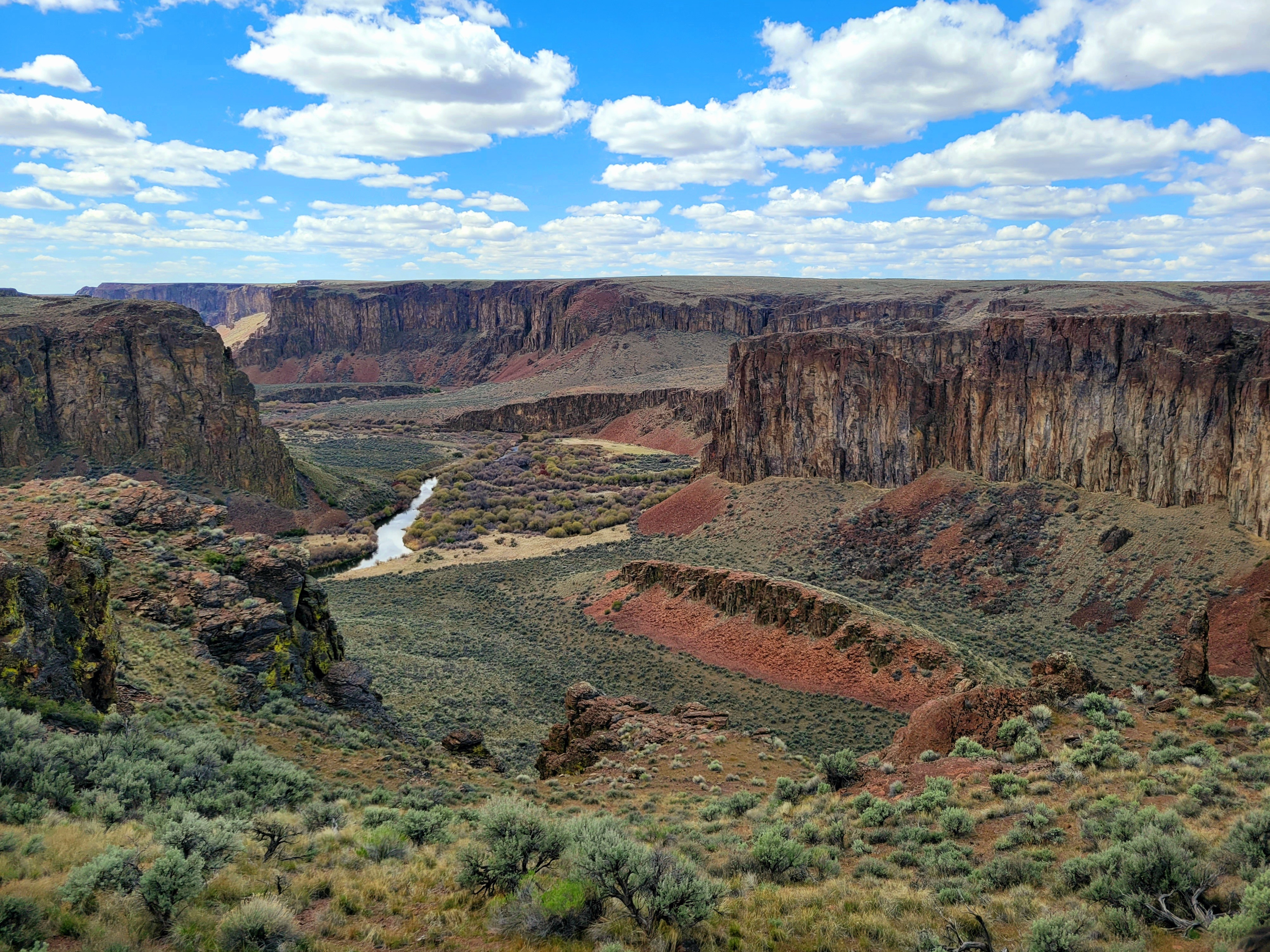
- Owyhee River Wilderness

- Location within the United States
- Location: Owyhee County, Idaho, United States
- Nearest city: Boise, Idaho
- Coordinates: 42°16′N 116°46′W
- Area: 267,328 acres (108,184 ha)
- Established: 2009
- Governing body: Bureau of Land Management

The Owyhee River Wilderness is located on the high basalt plateaus of Owyhee County in southwestern Idaho in the western United States. The wilderness area is named after and protects the upper Owyhee River, its tributaries, and the surrounding desert canyon landscape. Whitewater rafting is a popular recreational activity in this wilderness area. Managed by the Bureau of Land Management, it is the second-largest U.S. Wilderness Area that is not located within a National Forest, National Park, or National Wildlife Refuge. The BLM's Black Rock Desert Wilderness, located within Black Rock Desert – High Rock Canyon Emigrant Trails National Conservation Area, is larger. About 67.3 miles (108.3 km) of the Owyhee River is classified as a wild river.

== Geography ==
The Owyhee River Wilderness is irregularly shaped, generally following the course of the Owyhee River, South Fork Owyhee River, Little Owyhee River, Deep Creek, and Battle Creek, as well as including some plateau lands. The wilderness area stretches from the Oregon-Idaho border in the west to the Duck Valley Indian Reservation in the east to the Nevada-Idaho border in the south. The rivers and creeks are deeply eroded into the Owyhee Plateau, resulting in deep canyons. The only roads are rough and there are few trails. There are challenging whitewater rivers.

== Legislative history ==
The Owyhee River Wilderness was created by the Omnibus Public Land Management Act of 2009 and signed into law by President Barack Obama on March 30, 2009. Also created in the Omnibus Land Act were five additional southwestern Idaho wilderness areas in Owyhee County, collectively known as the Owyhee Canyonlands Wilderness Areas:

- Big Jacks Creek Wilderness - 52,826 acres (21,378 ha)
- Bruneau – Jarbidge Rivers Wilderness - 89,996 acres (36,420 ha)
- Little Jacks Creek Wilderness - 50,929 acres (20,610 ha)
- North Fork Owyhee Wilderness - 43,413 acres (17,569 ha)
- Pole Creek Wilderness - 12,533 acres (5,072 ha)

The Act of 2009 added 517,025 acres (209,233 ha) of wilderness within the state of Idaho. The Owyhee River Wilderness accounts for 51.7% of that area.

Wilderness areas do not allow motorized or mechanical equipment including bicycles. Although camping and fishing are allowed with proper permit, no roads or buildings are constructed and there is also no logging or mining, in compliance with the 1964 Wilderness Act. Wilderness areas within National Forests and Bureau of Land Management areas also allow hunting in season.

== Natural history ==
The Owyhee River Wilderness lies within the Owyhee Desert, part of the northern Basin and Range ecoregion, although hydrologically the wilderness area is within the Snake River – Columbia River drainage. The region is home to a varying amount of animal and plant life. Animals such as bighorn sheep, cougars, prairie falcons, bobcats, and pronghorn live through the region. A variety of plant life such as lupine, Eriogonum salicornioides, Phacelia lutea var., and bitterroot can also be found in the area.

== See also ==
- List of largest wilderness areas in the United States
- List of U.S. Wilderness Areas
