= Hat Peak =

Hat Peak may refer to:

== Places ==
- Hat Peak (Elko County, Nevada)
- Hat Peak (Nye County, Nevada)

== Other ==
- The horizontal surface on any hat or helmet that shades the eyes (British English, known as a visor in US English). See Peaked cap.
