= Bruneau–Jarbidge Rivers Wilderness =

Wilderness area in Owyhee County, Idaho

Bruneau – Jarbidge Rivers Wilderness
- IUCN category Ib (wilderness area)
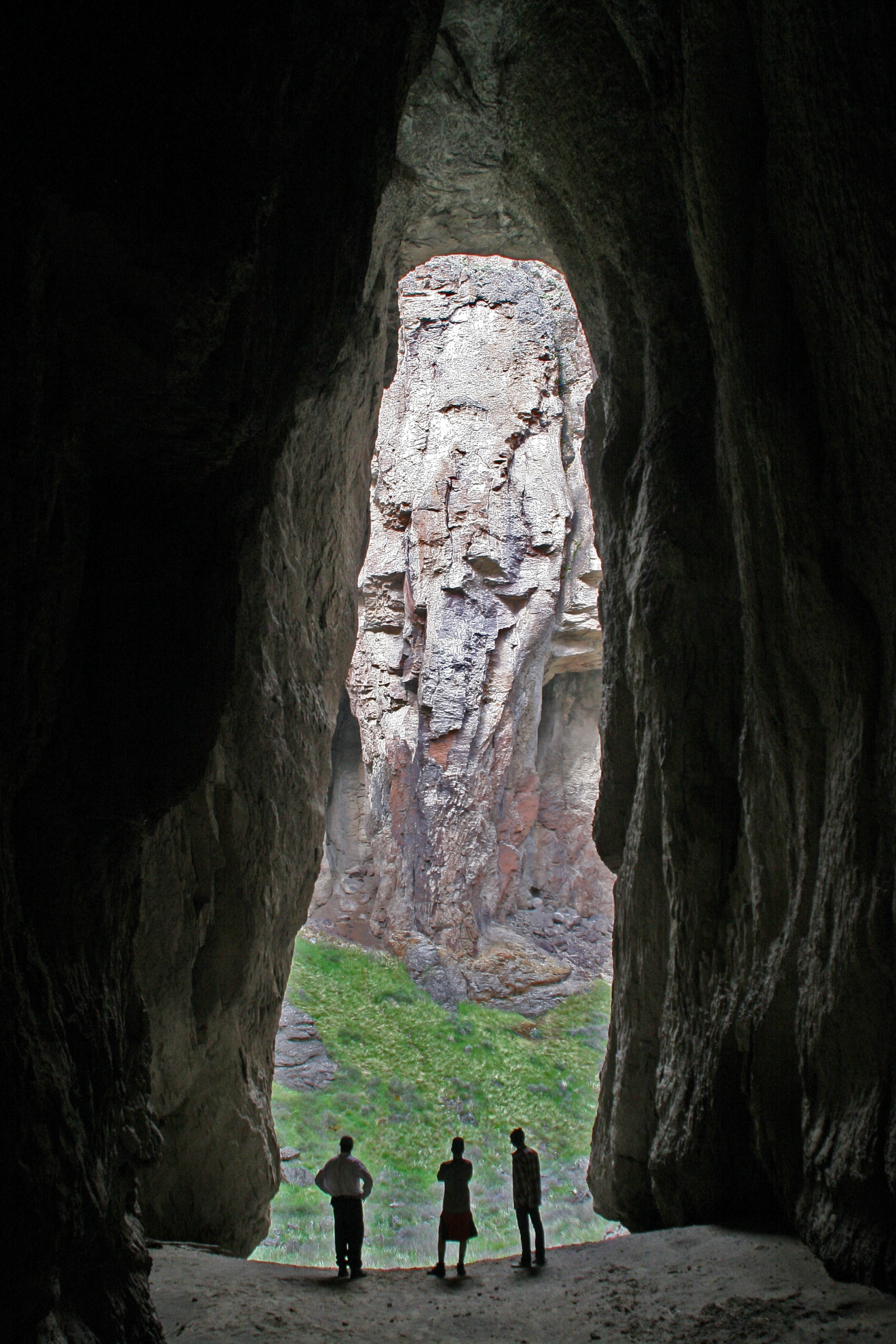

- Location within the United States
- Location: Owyhee County, Idaho, United States
- Nearest city: Boise, Idaho
- Coordinates: 42°23′45.8″N 115°37′32.8″W
- Area: 89,996 acres (36,420 ha)
- Established: 2009
- Governing body: Bureau of Land Management

The Bruneau – Jarbidge Rivers Wilderness is located on the high basalt plateaus of Owyhee County in southwestern Idaho in the western United States. The wilderness area is named after and protects much of the Bruneau and Jarbidge Rivers and their canyons. Whitewater rafting is a popular recreational activity in this wilderness area, which has rivers up to Class V. About 40 miles (64 km) of the Bruneau River and about 28.8 miles (46.3 km) of the Jarbidge River are classified as a wild river.

== Geography ==
The wilderness area includes the Bruneau River from about five miles upstream of the Jarbidge confluence down nearly to the confluence with Hot Creek, as well as portions of Sheep Creek and Clover Creek. On the Jarbidge River, the wilderness spans the entire length from the confluence of the West and East Forks of the Jarbidge to the Bruneau confluence. In places the wilderness boundary is defined by the rim of the river canyon; elsewhere it includes some plateau country beyond the rim in addition to the river canyon. The wilderness area is bisected into two units by a small road at Indian Hot Springs, just north of the Bruneau-Jarbidge confluence.

== Legislative history ==
The Bruneau – Jarbidge Rivers Wilderness was created by the Omnibus Public Land Management Act of 2009 and signed into law by President Barack Obama on March 30, 2009. Also created in the Omnibus Land Act were five additional southwestern Idaho wilderness areas in Owyhee County, collectively known as the Owyhee Canyonlands Wilderness Areas:

- Big Jacks Creek Wilderness - 52,826 acres (21,378 ha)
- Little Jacks Creek Wilderness - 50,929 acres (20,610 ha)
- North Fork Owyhee Wilderness - 43,413 acres (17,569 ha)
- Owyhee River Wilderness - 267,328 acres (108,184 ha)
- Pole Creek Wilderness - 12,533 acres (5,072 ha)

The Act of 2009 added 517,025 acres (209,233 ha) of wilderness within the state of Idaho.

Wilderness areas do not allow motorized or mechanical equipment including bicycles. Although camping and fishing are allowed with proper permit, no roads or buildings are constructed and there is also no logging or mining, in compliance with the 1964 Wilderness Act. Wilderness areas within National Forests and Bureau of Land Management areas also allow hunting in season.

== Natural history ==
The Bruneau – Jarbidge Rivers Wilderness lies within the Owyhee Desert, part of the northern Basin and Range ecoregion, although hydrologically the wilderness area is within the Snake River – Columbia River drainage. The wilderness area is home to a small population of threatened bull trout, as well as Great Basin redband trout, bobcat, river otter, and bighorn sheep.

== See also ==
- Jarbidge Wilderness
- List of largest wilderness areas in the United States
- List of U.S. Wilderness Areas
- Wilderness Act
