= Pole Creek =

Pole Creek may refer to:

- Pole Creek (South Dakota), a stream in South Dakota
- Pole Creek Wilderness, a protected area in Idaho
