= Y P Desert =

Desert in the United States

Coordinates: 42°00′N 116°40′W

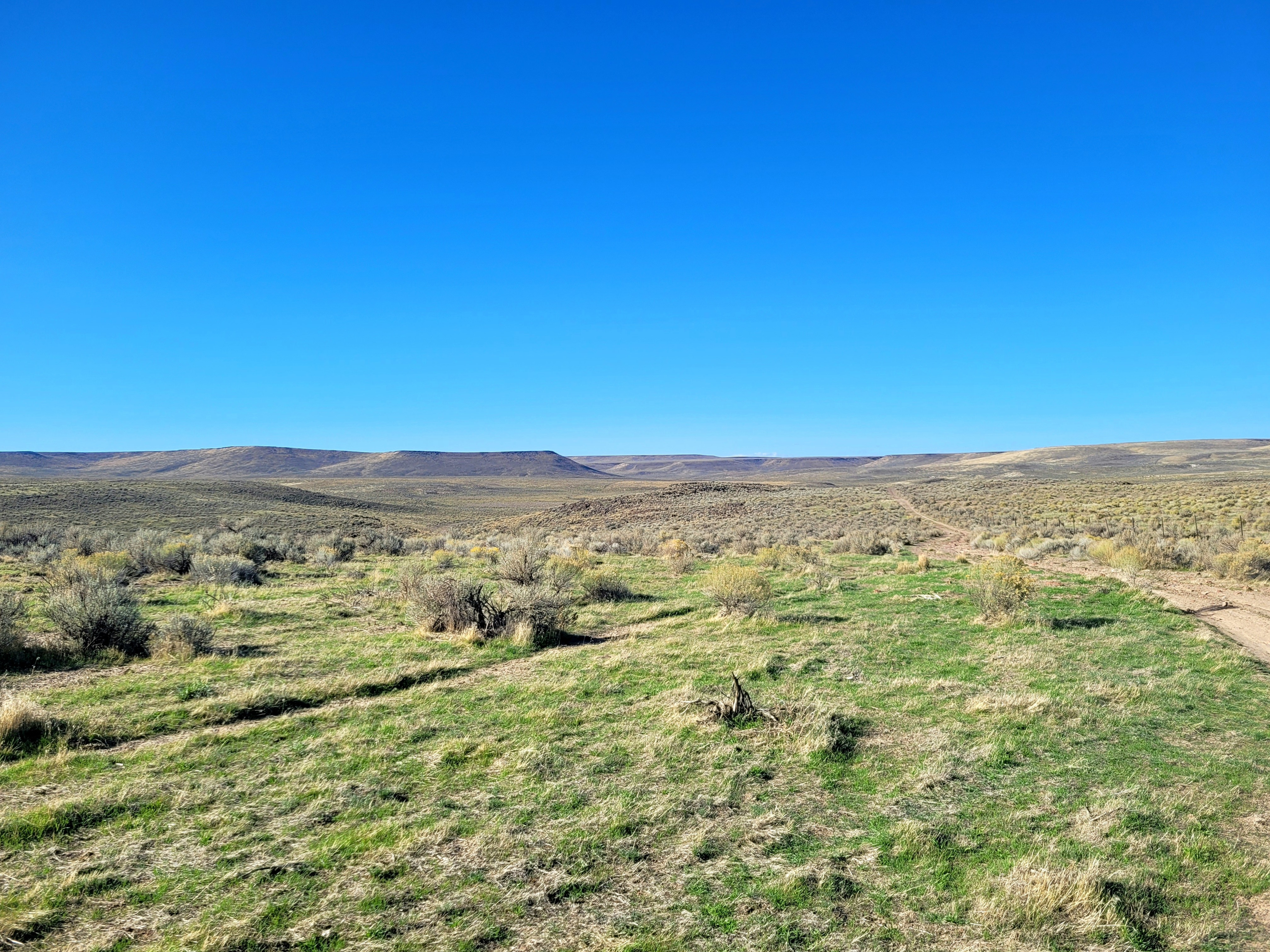
View of Piute Basin located in the Y P Desert.

The Y P Desert is a desert and ecoregion, within the deserts and xeric shrublands biome, in Owyhee County, Idaho, and Elko County, Nevada in the northwestern United States.

The Y P Desert lies at the eastern edges of the Owyhee Desert, and is home to the South Fork Owyhee River Recreation Area.

Josephine Reservoir, a small reservoir, Hat Peak, and the Duck Valley Indian Reservation are at the eastern perimeter of the Y P Desert.
