= Pole Creek Wilderness =

Protected area in Idaho, United States

- IUCN category Ib (wilderness area)
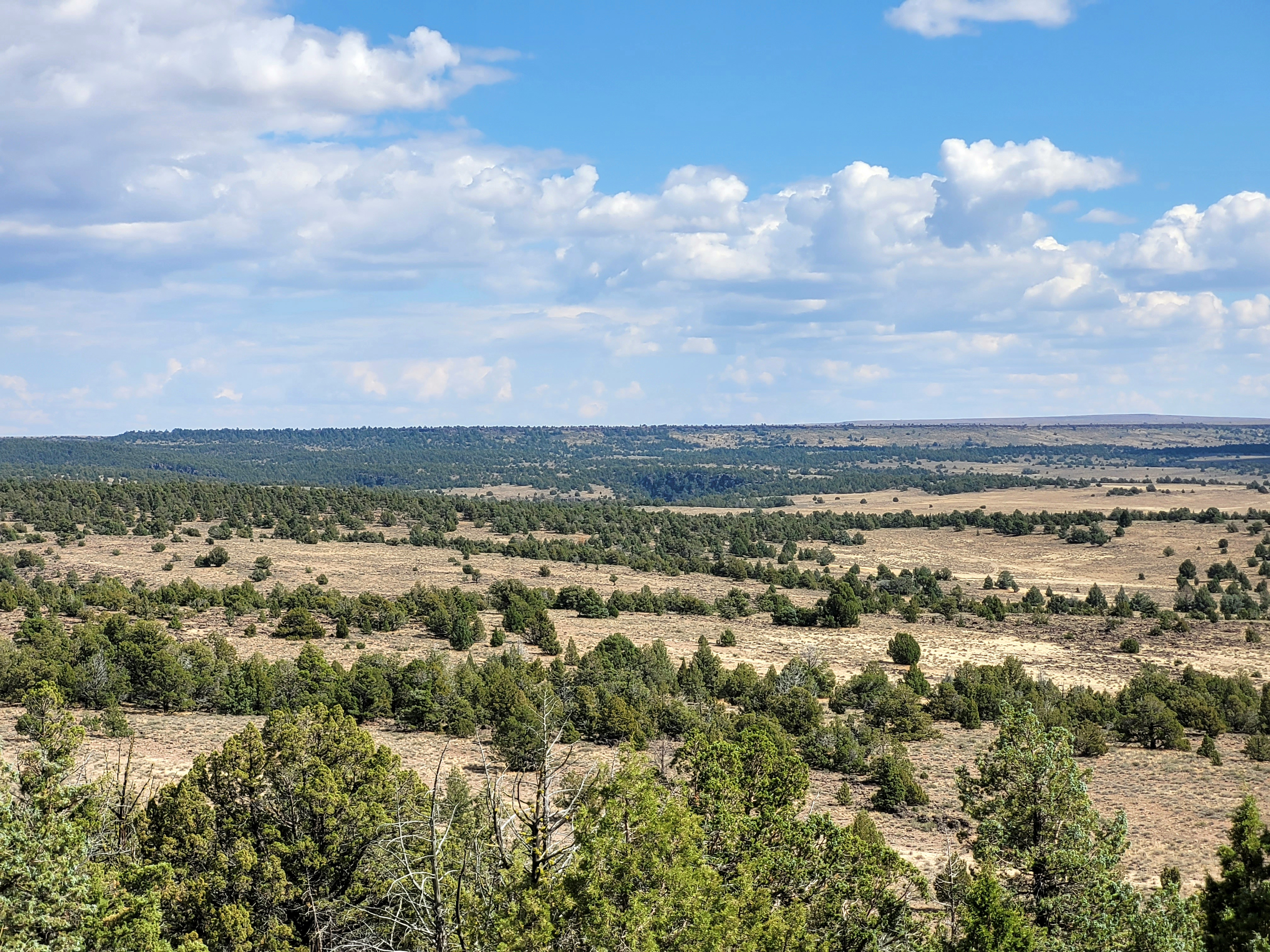

- Location within the United States
- Location: Owyhee County, Idaho, USA
- Nearest city: Boise, Idaho
- Coordinates: 42°31′39″N 116°30′19″W
- Area: 12,533 acres (5,072 ha)
- Established: 2009
- Governing body: Bureau of Land Management

The Pole Creek Wilderness is located on the high rhyolite and basalt plateaus of Owyhee County in southwestern Idaho in the western United States. Its whitewater rapids are a popular attraction.

== Geography ==
The Pole Creek Wilderness has canyons over 800 feet (240 m) deep, and sagebrush and grassland plateaus. These canyons in Owyhee County have been called "the largest concentration of sheer-walled volcanic rhyolite and basalt canyons in the western United States". There are no designated trails.

== Legislative history ==
The Pole Creek Wilderness was created by the Omnibus Public Land Management Act of 2009. Also created in the Omnibus Land Act were five additional southwestern Idaho wilderness areas in Owyhee County, collectively known as the Owyhee Canyonlands Wilderness Areas:

- Big Jacks Creek Wilderness - 52,826 acres (21,378 ha)
- Bruneau – Jarbidge Rivers Wilderness - 89,996 acres (36,420 ha)
- Little Jacks Creek Wilderness - 50,929 acres (20,610 ha)
- North Fork Owyhee Wilderness - 43,413 acres (17,569 ha)
- Owyhee River Wilderness - 267,328 acres (108,184 ha)

The act of 2009 added 517,025 acres (209,233 ha) of wilderness within the state of Idaho.

== Natural history ==
The Pole Creek Wilderness lies within the Owyhee Desert, part of the northern Basin and Range ecoregion, although hydrologically the wilderness area is within the Snake River – Columbia River drainage. The area is home to mule deer, pronghorn, bighorn sheep, sage grouse, hawks, eagles, falcons, songbirds and many rare plants.

== See also ==
- List of largest wilderness areas in the United States
- List of U.S. Wilderness Areas
- Wilderness Act
