= Pole Creek (South Dakota) =

Stream in South Dakota, U.S.

Coordinates: 43°58′49″N 103°51′40″W

Pole Creek is a stream in the U.S. state of South Dakota.

Pole Creek is lined with pole-shaped trees, hence the name.

== See also ==
- List of rivers of South Dakota
