= Basin and Range =

Basin and Range may refer to:

- Basin and Range Province, physiographic province of the United States west of the Rocky Mountains
- Basin and range topography, type of topography typical of the Basin and Range Province
- Basin and Range National Monument, in Lincoln and Nye counties in southeastern Nevada, within the Basin and Range Province
- Basin and Range a book on geology written by John McPhee published in 1981, the first book of what would become the Annals of the Former World.
