= Hat Peak (Nye County, Nevada) =

Mountain in Nevada, United States

Coordinates: 38°26′14″N 116°54′27″W

Hat Peak is a summit in the U.S. state of Nevada. The elevation is 8,625 feet (2,629 m).

Hat Peak was so named on account of its hat-shaped outline.
