= Hat Peak (Elko County, Nevada) =

Mountain in Nevada, United States

Coordinates: 41°54′19″N 116°23′28″W

Hat Peak is a summit in the U.S. state of Nevada. The elevation is 5,886 feet (1,794 m).

Hat Peak was so named on account of its hat-shaped outline. Variant names are "Hat Butte" and "Hat Mountain".
