= Owyhee Desert =

Ecoregion in Oregon, Idaho, and Nevada, United States

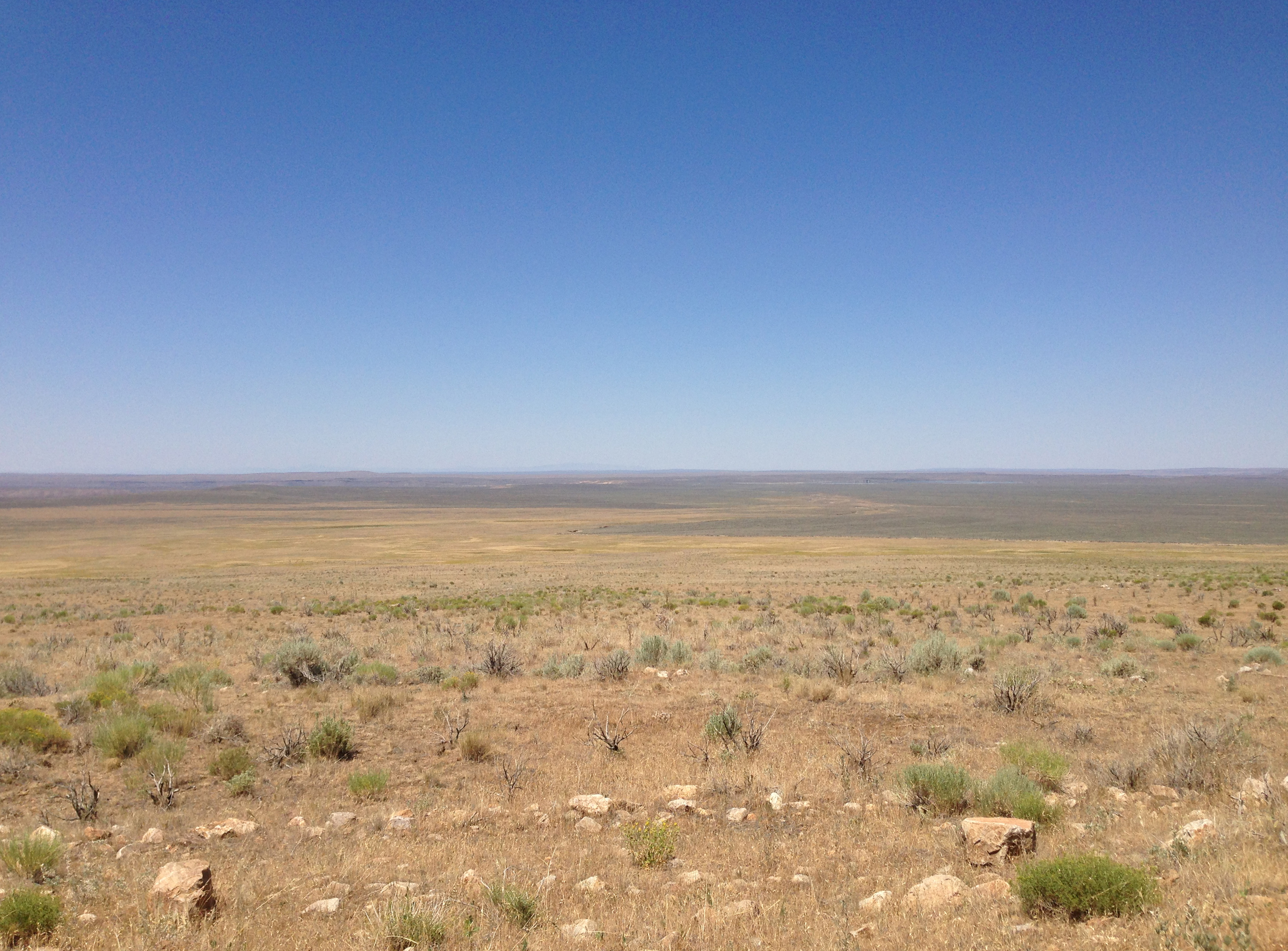
- Much of the Owyhee Desert in Nevada is flat and fairly featureless

Geography
- Country: United States
- States: Nevada; Idaho; Oregon
- Coordinates: 41.8°N 117°W
- Interactive map of Owyhee Desert

The Owyhee Desert ecoregion, within the deserts and xeric shrublands biome, is in the Northwestern United States. The Owyhee Uplands Byway passes through the desert.

== Geography ==
An arid region of canyons, volcanic rock, sagebrush and grass makes up the ~9,375 sq mi (24,280 km^{2}) Owyhee Desert.

The desert is in northern Nevada, southwestern Idaho and southeastern Oregon. It is located on the south edge of the Columbia Plateau southwest of Boise, Idaho, stretching east from the Santa Rosa Range. It has a mean elevation of approximately 5,300 ft (1,600 m). The Owyhee Desert is primarily drained by the tributaries of the Bruneau River and Owyhee Rivers, which then flow into the Snake River.

== Management ==
Most of the land in the desert is owned by the federal government and managed by the Bureau of Land Management. It is largely used as ranch land.

In 1999, the Desert Group submitted an alternative for Owyhee resource management.

== See also ==
- Bruneau – Jarbidge Rivers Wilderness
- Owyhee River Wilderness
- Y P Desert
- Northern Basin and Range (ecoregion)
