= Wild river =

Classification of rivers or river systems

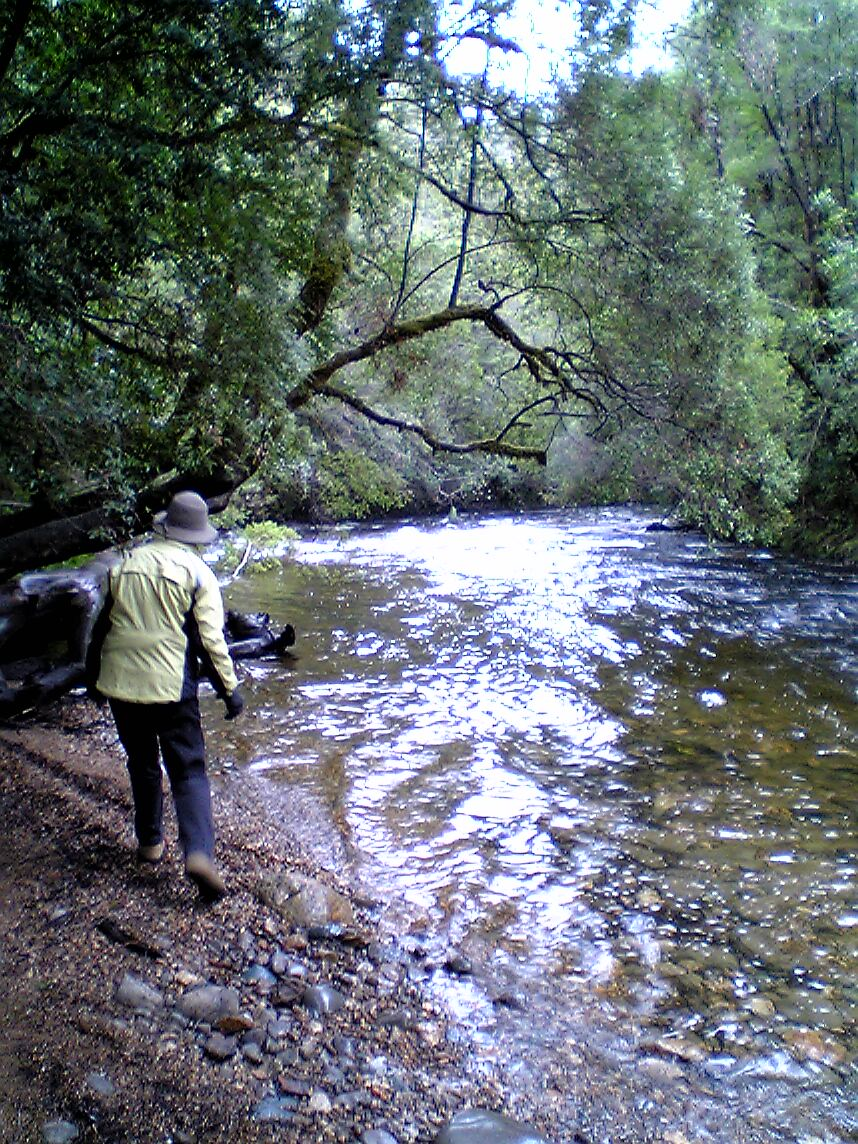
- An example of a wild river, the Franklin River, protected as part of the Franklin-Gordon Wild Rivers National Park in Tasmania

A wild river (United States, Australia, & New Zealand) or heritage river (Canada) is a river or a river system designated by a government to be protected and kept "relatively untouched by development and are therefore in near natural condition, with all, or almost all, of its natural values intact."

Within some nations including in the United States of America, Canada, New Zealand, and the Commonwealth of Australia, governments have opted to focus on rivers and river systems as a kind of "unmodified or slightly modified" landscape feature to protect, manage and preserve in near 'natural' condition – variously labeling or formally declaring such areas to be "wild rivers" (or "heritage rivers").

The term "wild river" may also more generically describe or identify free-flowing rivers without dams.

== Concerns about the term ==
Where rivers or river systems may be labeled 'wild rivers' with the intention of protecting them to a Wilderness (IUCN Category 1b) standard, the International Union for the Conservation of Nature (IUCN) warns:

Indigenous and traditional peoples have often been unfairly affected by conservation policies and practices, which have failed to fully understand the rights and roles of indigenous peoples in the management, use and conservation of biodiversity

Most recently, in Australia, following some declarations, and in the lead up to a number of other 'wild river declarations using Queensland's wild rivers' legislation, Australia's Human Rights and Equal Opportunity Commission observed:

The Commission notes that Indigenous peoples of the Archer, Lockhart and Stewart River Basins disagree with the term 'wild rivers'. They argue that the term is culturally inappropriate and implies that the land and waters in a proposed declaration were uninhabited and predominantly void of human activity. The use of the term 'wild' does not equate with Indigenous peoples' perspectives and their continuing use of the rivers.

== Wild rivers by country ==
=== Australia ===
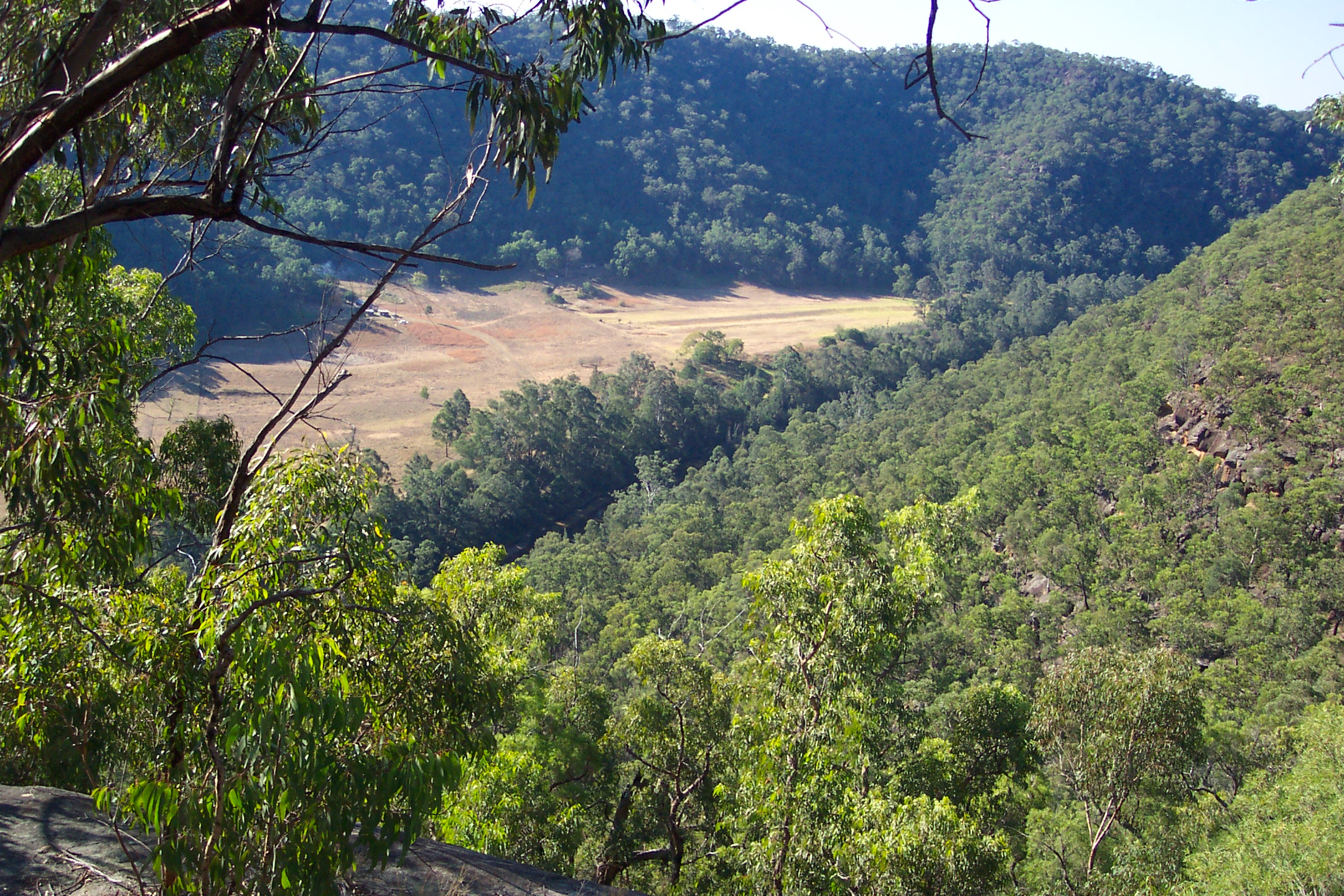
View down Colo River Valley, New South Wales, being river recently protected as a Wild River under New South Wales' National Parks and Wildlife Act 1974

In 1979, Tasmania's Hydro-Electricity Commission released a proposal to dam and inundate the Gordon (37 km (23 mi)) and Franklin (33 km (21 mi)) Rivers, leading the Tasmanian Wilderness Society and other conservation groups to mobilize one of Australia's largest conservation battles and acts of civil disobedience, focused heavily on "...the protection of the Franklin River, one of Australia’s last truly wild rivers..." resulting in the river being World Heritage listed (as part of the Tasmanian Wilderness world heritage area) and a subsequent Australian High Court decision preventing the damming of this wild river.

The then Prime Minister of Australia, in December 1992, gave a 'Statement on the Environment' speech committing the Commonwealth of Australia to identifying all of Australia's near-pristine rivers and to encouraging government agencies plus Australian peoples generally to more effectively protect and manage those rivers as total catchments. This commitment translated into the establishment of an Australian Heritage Commission Wild Rivers Project:

# to identify Australia's wild rivers;

1. to develop a voluntary code of conservation management guidelines for wild rivers;
2. to promote awareness of the values of wild rivers

By 1998 the Australian Heritage Commission's Wild Rivers Project, working in cooperation with all states, had produced maps identifying Australia's wild rivers across all of the Commonwealth's States, plus "Conservation Guidelines for the Management of Wild River Values".

New South Wales opted to adapt, protect and declare wild rivers, including over 7,600 km (4,700 mi) of waterways and tributaries of the Grose and Colo rivers, under its existing National Parks and Wildlife Act 1974.

Queensland identified an initial 19 rivers to be protected as wild rivers and, in September 2005, opted to enact "Australia’s first comprehensive and stand alone legislation to identify, protect and preserve that State’s remaining wild rivers". In 2007, Queensland declared its first wild rivers within the Gulf of Carpentaria, as well as at Fraser Island, and Hinchinbrook Island and in April 2009 a further three wild river areas have been declared in Cape York Peninsula.

Australia's Wilderness Society (who find their early origins in the original Tasmanian Franklin Wild River campaign), also chose to renew and re-initiate its wild river campaigning "...to seek government action around a Wild Rivers framework building on the Australian Heritage Commission’s earlier work...", being an ongoing campaign as follows:

From the days of the Franklin River campaign in Tasmania, wild rivers have captured the imagination of Australia. Little known is that the majority of Australia’s wild rivers are in the tropical north. The natural river flows that are the heartbeat of the North’s diverse ecosystems and lifeblood for many existing communities are under threat from dams, irrigation schemes, and land clearing in their catchments

In January 2010, the Queensland Wild Rivers Act 2005 became the subject of national interest when federal Opposition leader Tony Abbott announced a plan to 'overturn' the Act through a proposed Wild Rivers Environmental Management Bill. This legislation intended to insert a provision in the Queensland Act, granting Indigenous titleholders a right to consent to this one regulation. The introduction of the Wild Rivers (Environmental Management) Bill to both houses of federal parliament in 2010 and 2011 led to a series of parliamentary inquiries, though in October 2011, Queensland Liberal National Party candidate Campbell Newman indicated he planned to 'axe' the legislation if elected. Elected in March 2012, Newman subsequently announced he would eventually replace the Wild Rivers Act solely in Cape York Peninsula under a Bio-Regional Management Plan anticipated in October 2013.

=== Canada ===
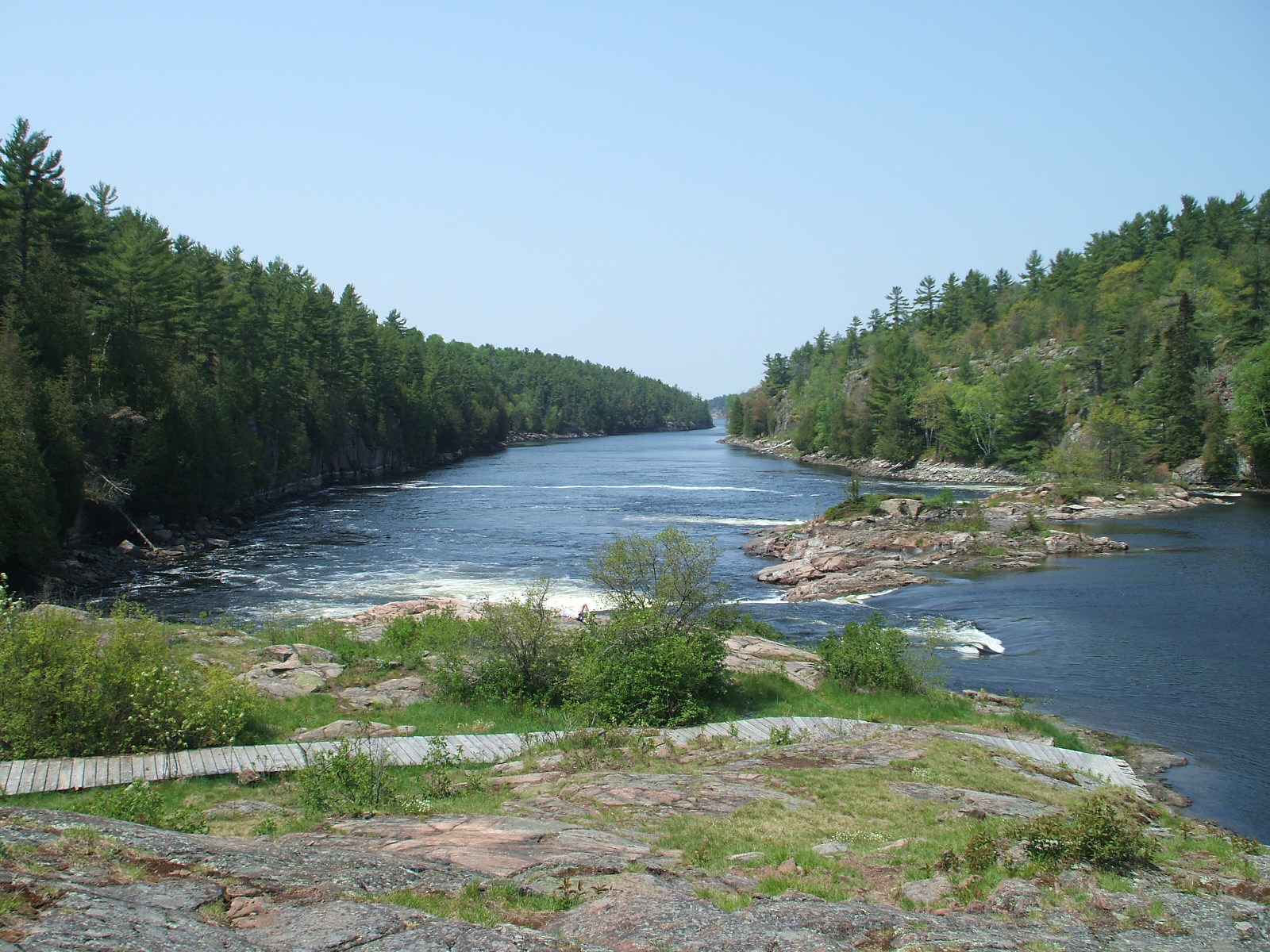
View of French River, Canada's first designated Heritage River

Canada has been described as follows:

Canada is a land of rivers. White ribbons cascading through endless boreal forest. Silver ribbons sliding down broad, glacier-carved valleys. Meandering muddy rivers sweeping across the prairies. Ribbons of green linking a labyrinth of lakes, ponds and bogs on the Canadian Shield. Sparkling brooks cascading to the ocean. Rivers are everywhere imprinted on the Canadian landscape – and in the hearts and minds of its people.

In 1984 Canada's federal, provincial and territorial governments established a Canadian Heritage Rivers System as Canada's national river conservation program – to conserve and protect the heritage values and integrity of the best examples of Canada's large, free flowing rivers and river systems.

Canada's river conservation program was not established by statute, but is instead a cooperative arrangement between Canada's ten provinces and three territories establishing a fifteen-member (appointed) Canadian Heritage Rivers Board, to which participating members nominate rivers to be designated as heritage rivers, for which river management plans building on existing statutory powers are prepared, agreed, and endorsed.

The French River in Ontario was the first river to be designated a heritage river, in 1986, and since then 40 rivers have been designated across Canada:

The CHRS [Canadian Heritage River System] is a public trust. Local citizens champion the program. Actions taken are grass roots driven. Governments – federal, provincial and territorial – lend support and guidance, and provide approvals as required. Communities, Aboriginal Peoples, landowners, and other stakeholders have their rights and concerns respected. These cornerstones make the CHRS an open and effective forum for collaboration and partnership on river conservation.

=== New Zealand ===
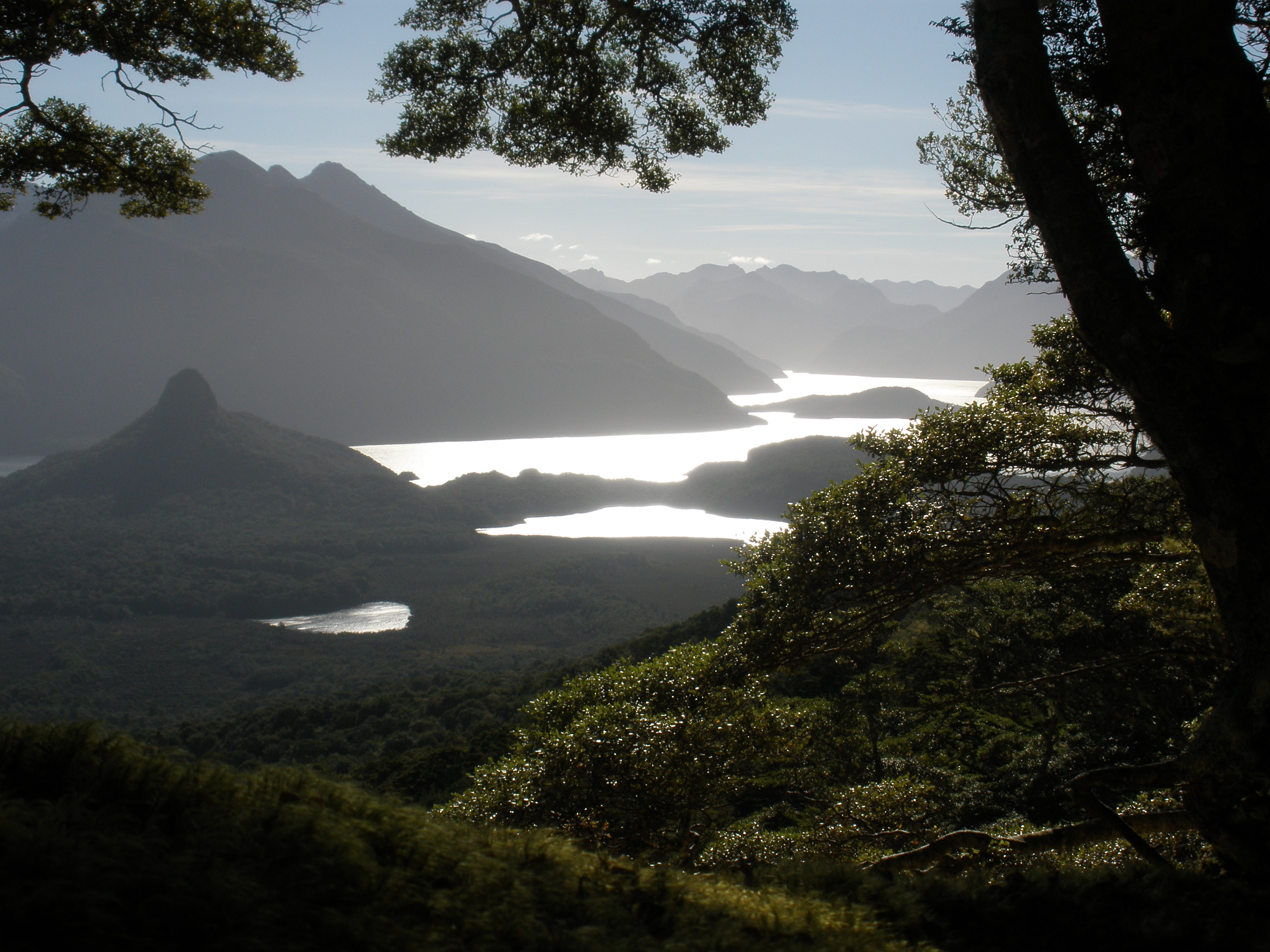
View of Lake Manapouri, the protection of which was a key milestone in New Zealand environmental protection

Through to the 1970s in New Zealand a conservation movement formed around a number of largely unprecedented campaigns "...to save wild river landscapes..." including particularly campaigns to prevent damming of the Clutha River, damming of the Motu River, and raising the waters of Lake Manapouri (with the Save Manapouri Campaign now regarded as a key milestone in New Zealand environmental protection, and the Lake itself ultimately ending up in the Te Wahipounamu World Heritage Area).

These wild river campaigns led, in 1981, to the passing of a Wild and Scenic Rivers legislation and, in 1984, to the Motu River becoming New Zealand's first "Wild and Scenic River". Since then 14 other wild rivers have been protected in accordance with New Zealand's Wild Rivers legislation (with 'Water Conservation orders' being made), and in 2009 conservation groups have initiated a renewed and reinvigorated national scale "wild rivers" campaign with the following rationale:

...despite current legislation, and despite our history of protection, many of our remaining wild rivers face threats. Every river dammed for power is one less river unmodified and free. Every river modified is one more wild landscape lost... Unless we arrest this slide, our grandchildren may be left to defend the last wild river in New Zealand.

=== United States ===
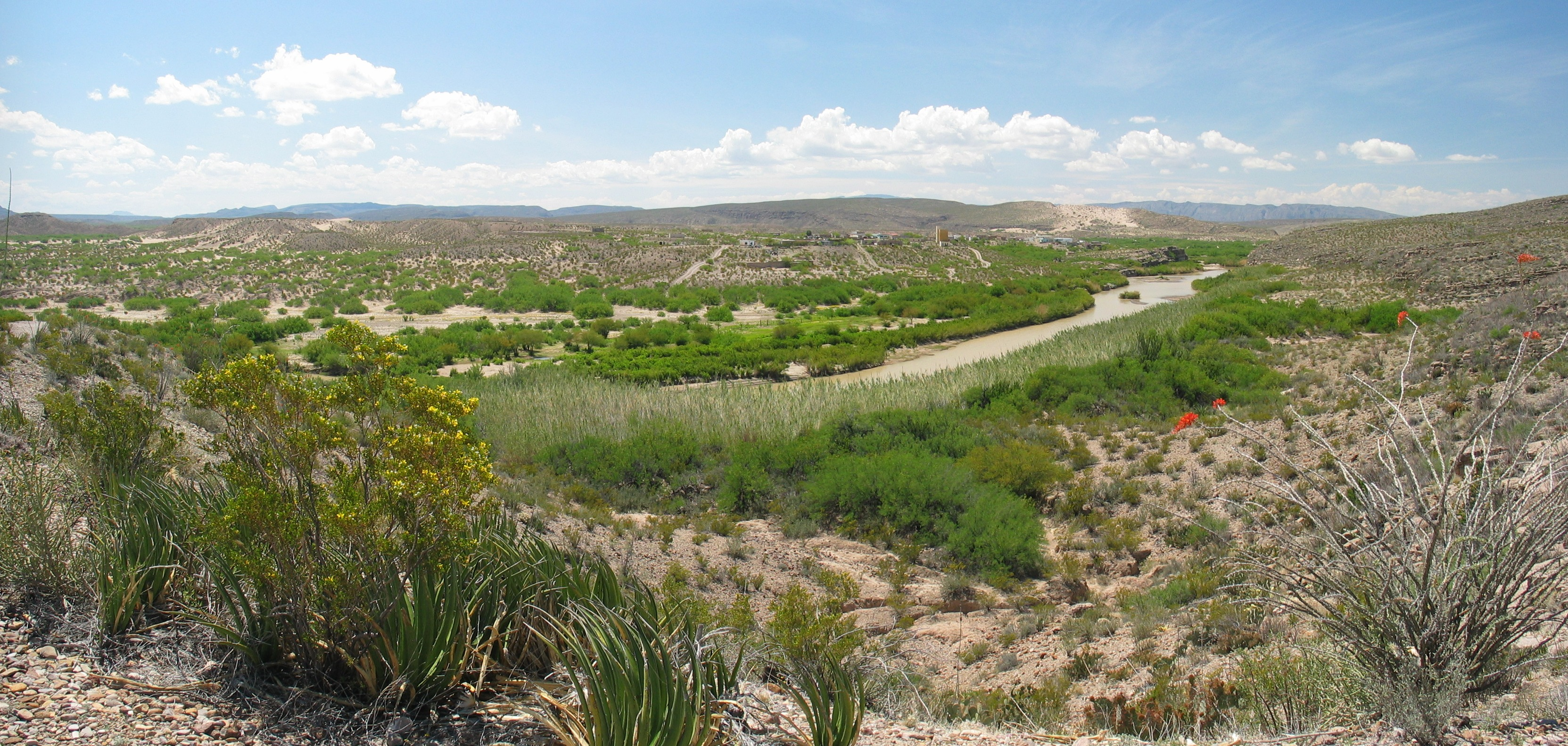
View of Rio Grande, Big Bend National Park, designated Wild River in 1978, Texas, United States

Following a Presidential Commission reviewing the outdoor recreational resources of the United States of America, the United States Congress passed the Wild and Scenic Rivers Act in October 1968, creating a National Wild and Scenic Rivers System as follows:

It is hereby declared to be the policy of the United States that certain selected rivers of the Nation which, with their immediate environments, possess outstandingly remarkable scenic, recreational, geologic, fish and wildlife, historic, cultural or other similar values, shall be preserved in free-flowing condition, and that they and their immediate environments shall be protected for the benefit and enjoyment of present and future generations

As of 2008 (after 40 years since the United States National Wild and Scenic Rivers System was first created), more than 11,000 miles (18,000 km) of 166 rivers in 38 States plus the Commonwealth of Puerto Rico have been protected.

== See also ==
- Canadian Heritage Rivers System
- List of National Wild and Scenic Rivers
- National Wild and Scenic Rivers System
