= Northern Basin and Range ecoregion =

Ecoregion in the United States

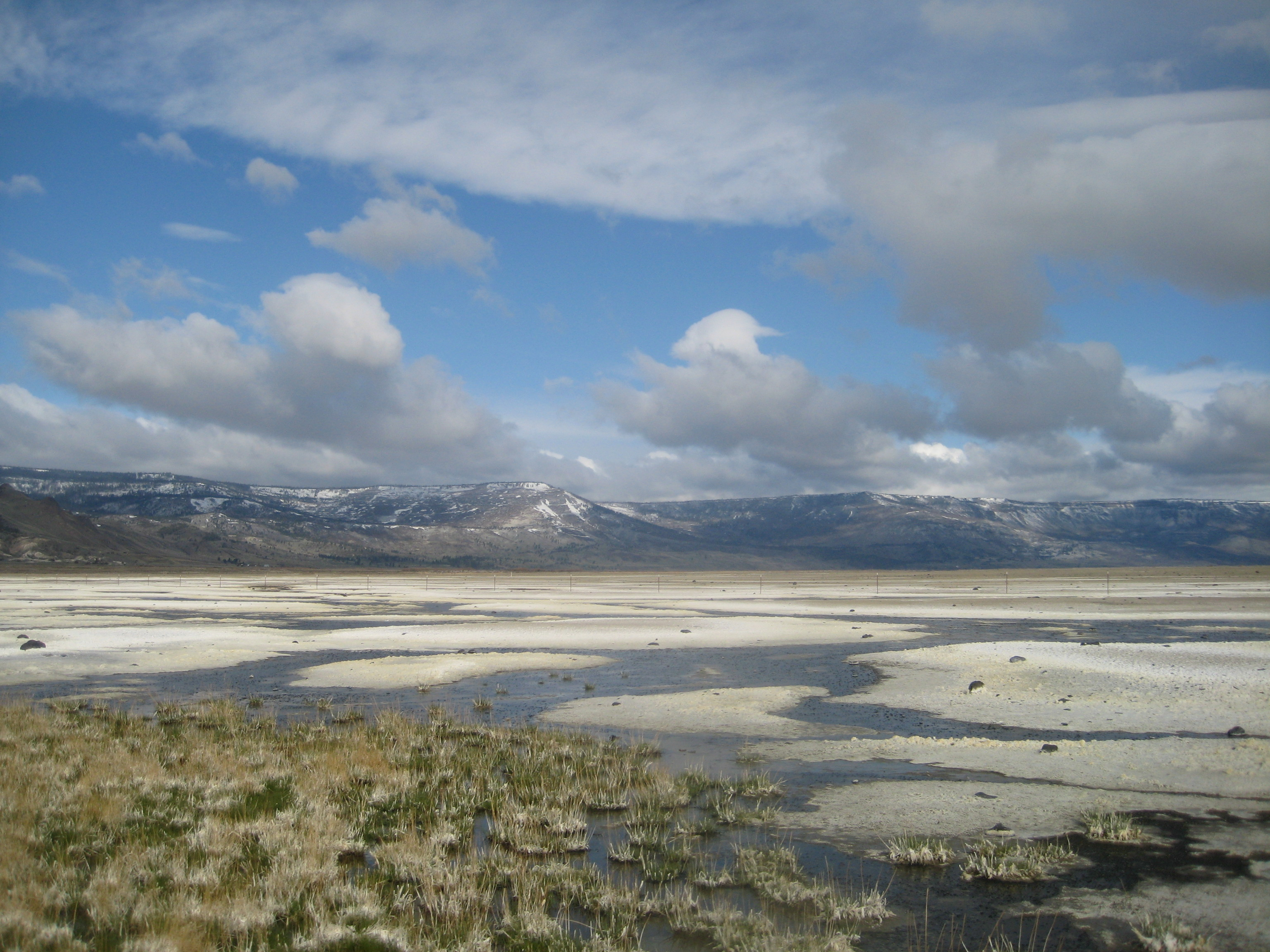
- Salt deposits at Summer Lake

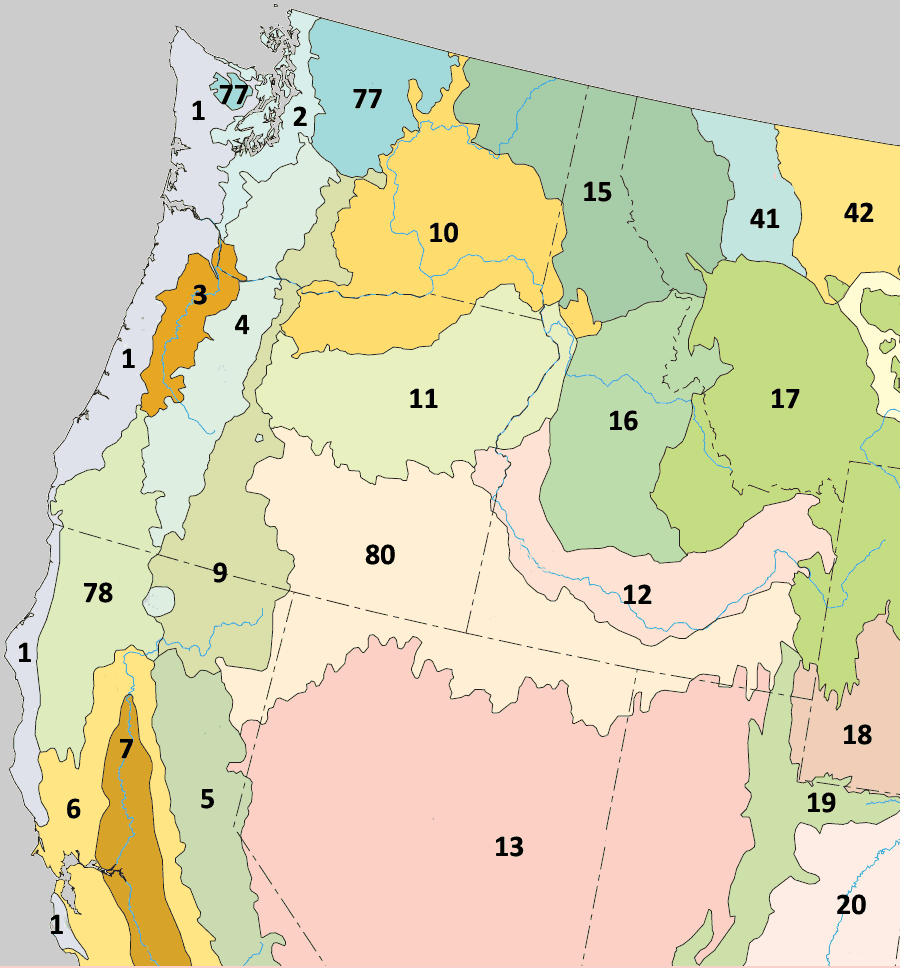
- Northern Basin and Range (80)

Ecology
- Realm: Nearctic
- Borders: List: Sierra Nevada (5); Eastern Cascades Slopes and Foothills (9); Blue Mountains (11); Snake River Plain (12); Central Basin and Range (13); Middle Rockies (17); Wasatch and Uinta Mountains (19)

Geography
- Country: United States
- States: Oregon; Idaho; Nevada; Utah; California
- Coordinates: 43°N 117°W

The Northern Basin and Range ecoregion is a Level III ecoregion designated by the United States Environmental Protection Agency (EPA) in the U.S. states of Oregon, Idaho, Nevada, Utah, and California. It contains dissected lava plains, rolling hills, alluvial fans, valleys, and scattered mountain ranges in the northern part of the Great Basin. Although arid, the ecoregion is higher and cooler than the Snake River Plain to the north and has more available moisture and a cooler climate than the Central Basin and Range to the south. Its southern boundary is determined by the highest shoreline of Pleistocene Lake Bonneville, which once inundated the Central Basin and Range. The western part of the region is internally drained; its eastern stream network drains to the Snake River system.

The valleys support sagebrush steppe or saltbush vegetation. Mollisol soils are common, in contrast to the aridisols of the Central Basin. Juniper-dominated woodland occurs on rugged, stony uplands. The mountain ranges are covered in mountain sagebrush, Idaho fescue, Douglas-fir, subalpine forests, or aspen. Today, most of the region is used for livestock grazing. Dryland and irrigated cropland are found in some areas, but in general the soils are less suitable for agriculture than those in the Columbia Plateau and the Snake River Plain ecoregions. Most public lands in the region are managed by the Bureau of Land Management.

The Northern Basin and Range ecoregion has been subdivided into fourteen Level IV ecoregions, as described below. Level IV mapping is not yet complete in California, and the information below includes only the sections in Oregon, Idaho, Nevada, and Utah.

== Level IV ecoregions ==
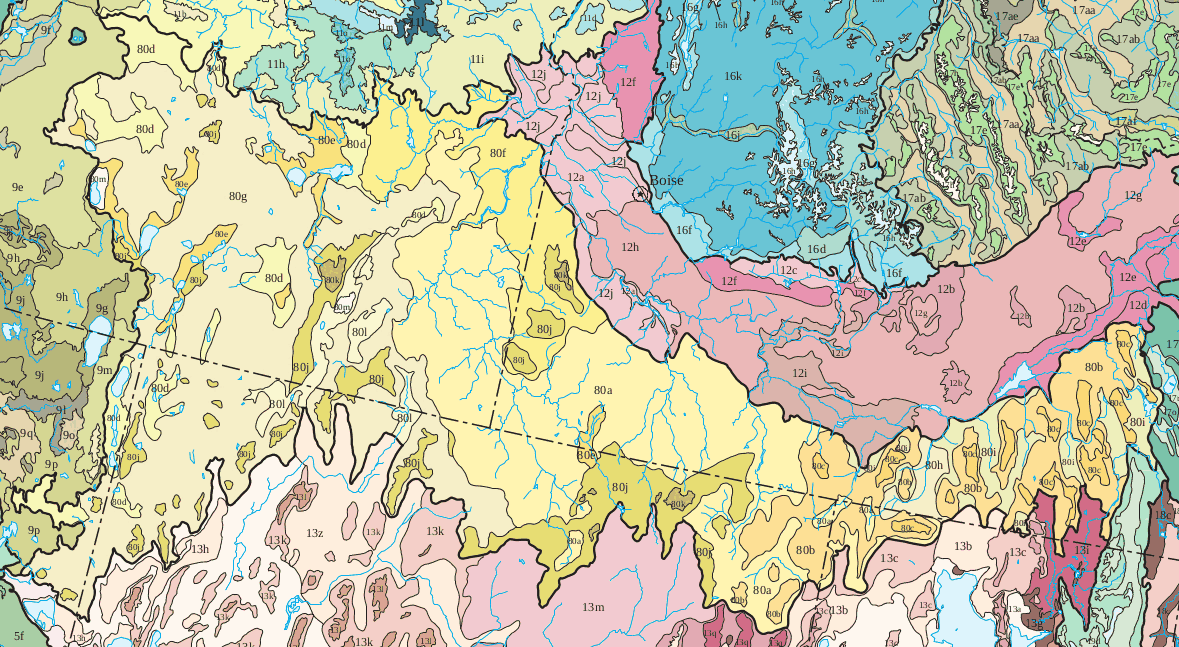
Level IV ecoregions in the Northern Basin and Range in Oregon, Idaho, Utah, and Nevada.

=== Dissected High Lava Plateau (80a) ===
The Dissected High Lava Plateau ecoregion is a broad to gently rolling basalt plateau cut by deep, sheer-walled canyons, with perennial and intermittent streams draining to the Snake River. Elevation varies from 4,000 to 7,300 feet (1,219 to 2,225 m). The region is less wooded, lower, and more arid than neighboring subregions in the Northern Basin and Range. It differs from sagebrush-dominated regions in the Central Basin and Range in having higher precipitation and colder winters. Potential natural vegetation is mostly sagebrush steppe; Wyoming big sagebrush and black sagebrush are abundant, as well as Douglas rabbitbrush, Idaho fescue, bluebunch wheatgrass, western wheatgrass, Thurber's needlegrass, bottlebrush squirreltail, Great Basin wildrye, Sandberg's bluegrass, Indian ricegrass, and cheatgrass. Juniper-pinyon woodlands grow on rocky and gravelly uplands. Understory species are denser and biological soil crusts tend to be more extensive and in better condition than at similar elevations in the Central Basin and Range. Cheatgrass has replaced depleted bunchgrasses in overgrazed areas. One of the largest Northern Basin and Range subregions, the Dissected High Lava Plateau covers 5,364 square miles (13,893 km^{2}) in Idaho, 3,984 square miles (10,319 km^{2}) in Oregon, 3,537 square miles (9,161 km^{2}) in Nevada, and 412 square miles (1,067 km^{2}) in Utah, including much of the Owyhee Desert. It is primarily used for rangeland and wildlife habitat. Contiguous areas in California have not been mapped yet.

=== Semiarid Hills and Low Mountains (80b) ===
The Semiarid Hills and Low Mountains ecoregion is higher and more rugged than the sagebrush plains and basins of neighboring regions. It is composed of unglaciated mountain slopes, hills, and alluvial fans at an elevation of 4,600 to 9,000 feet (1,402 to 2,743 m). The region is covered by mountain big sagebrush, low sagebrush, and associated grasses and understory plants, including bluebunch wheatgrass, Sandberg bluegrass, Great Basin wildrye, Indian ricegrass, cheatgrass, Idaho fescue, needle-and-thread grass, snowberry, and serviceberry. Scattered juniper woodlands grow on shallow and rocky soils. These hills represent the northern limit for both pinyon and Utah juniper; western juniper replaces them to the west and north. Groves of aspen grow on alluvial fans and along stream networks, with some lodgepole pine and Douglas-fir. Geyer willow and Booth willow are also present in riparian areas. The region includes streams that have been designated for protection as critical or high priority habitat for Yellowstone cutthroat trout and other fish. Water quality has been lightly to moderately degraded by human activities, such as historic gold mining and livestock grazing, which is the primary land use today. The ecoregion covers 3,567 square miles (9,238 km^{2}) in Idaho, 1,011 square miles (2,618 km^{2}) in Nevada, and 479 square miles (1,241 km^{2}) in Utah, including Shoshone and Bannock land on the Fort Hall Indian Reservation and public land within the Sawtooth and Caribou-Targhee national forests.

=== High Elevation Forests and Shrublands (80c) ===
The High Elevation Forests and Shrublands ecoregion is composed of steep, rugged, unglaciated mountains with cold winters, at an elevation of 6,000 to 9,900 feet (1,829 to 3,018 m). It is characterized by a mix of conifers, mountain brush, and sagebrush grassland. North-facing slopes may support Douglas-fir, lodgepole pine, subalpine conifers, aspen, and snowberry. South-facing slopes may support mountain big sagebrush, serviceberry, snowberry, Idaho fescue, chokecherry, mountain brome, bluegrass, and bluebunch wheatgrass. Open grassland grows on wide ridge tops. Engelmann spruce and subalpine fir may be found in upper canyons. The region covers 943 square miles (2,442 km^{2}) in southeastern Idaho and 126 square miles (326 km^{2}) in northwestern Utah, including land within the Sawtooth and Caribou-Targhee national forests.

=== Pluvial Lake Basins (80d) ===
The Pluvial Lake Basins ecoregion contained vast lakes during the Pleistocene epoch that have now mostly disappeared. It is characterized by gently sloping, internally drained basins with lake terraces, playas, beach plains, stream terraces, intermittent lakes, fan skirts, and cool springs. Elevation varies from 4,200 to 6,200 feet (1,280 to 1,890 m). Some basin floor playas collect and evaporate water seasonally, but not as extensively as the High Desert Wetlands. Dry lake beds near the Cascade Mountains have a significant layer of volcanic ash. Greasewood, inland saltgrass, and seepweed grow in alkaline soils. Better drained, less alkaline soils are dominated by Wyoming big sagebrush and basin big sagebrush, with rubber rabbitbrush, Great Basin wildrye, bottlebrush squirreltail, Indian ricegrass, Sandberg's bluegrass, Thurber's needlegrass, and cheatgrass. The land is used for rangeland and sprinkler-irrigated alfalfa farming. The region covers 2,092 square miles (5,418 km^{2}) in Oregon and 342 square miles (886 km^{2}) in Nevada.

=== High Desert Wetlands (80e) ===
The nearly level High Desert Wetlands ecoregion consists of high desert lakes and surrounding wetlands that provide critical habitat for nesting and migratory birds and associated upland birds and mammals. Elevation varies from 4,000 to 5,200 feet (1,219 to 1,646 m). The fine-textured soils are poorly drained, and basins collect water seasonally. Although water levels fluctuate from year to year, lakes and wetlands in this region hold water more consistently than on the coarser, better drained soils of the Pluvial Lake Basins. Sedges, rushes, black greasewood, tufted hairgrass, mat muhly, meadow barley, creeping wildrye, and Nevada bluegrass occur in wetter areas. Drier areas support basin big sagebrush, Wyoming big sagebrush, silver sagebrush, bluebunch wheatgrass, basin wildrye, Idaho fescue, Thurber's needlegrass, and cheatgrass. The region covers 1,651 square miles (4,276 km^{2}) in Oregon, including the Malheur National Wildlife Refuge and land surrounding Malheur Lake, Paulina Marsh, Summer Lake, Lake Abert, and the Warner Lakes. It also includes 105 square miles (272 km^{2}) in Idaho and 56 square miles (145 km^{2}) in Nevada, on and around the Duck Valley Indian Reservation .

=== Owyhee Uplands and Canyons (80f) ===
The Owyhee Uplands and Canyons ecoregion is a sagebrush steppe containing deep river canyons, barren lava fields, badlands, and tuffaceous outcrops that are riddled by caves. Elevation varies from 2,500 to 6,600 feet (762 to 2,012 m). Although the region's climate and vegetation are similar to the Dissected High Lava Plateau, its lithology is more varied, stream density is higher, and water availability is greater. These attributes, combined with its remote location, make the region a particularly valuable refuge for wildlife. The steppe is characterized by Wyoming big sagebrush, basin big sagebrush, Douglas rabbitbrush, bluebunch wheatgrass, Idaho fescue, bottlebrush squirreltail, Sandberg's bluegrass, and cheatgrass. Rocky areas support scattered western juniper. It is mostly used for rangeland and wildlife habitat, with some hay and small grain farming. Cheatgrass has replaced depleted bunchgrasses in overgrazed areas. The region covers 2,991 square miles (7,747 km^{2}) in Oregon and 1,293 square miles (3,349 km^{2}) in Idaho, including Lake Owyhee and the Owyhee, Malheur, and Succor drainages.

=== High Lava Plains (80g) ===
The High Lava Plains ecoregion is a vast, nearly level to undulating sagebrush steppe containing scattered volcanic cones and buttes. Elevation varies from 4,200 to 6,800 feet (1,280 to 2,073 m). The region is similar to the Dissected High Lava Plateau in its physiography, climate, and vegetation, but, unlike the plateau, it is internally drained. As a result, it lacks anadromous fish runs. It also differs from the plateau in having numerous intermittent lakes on the impermeable volcanic bedrock. Vegetation on the steppe includes Wyoming big sagebrush, low sagebrush, mountain big sagebrush, Lahontan sagebrush, bluebunch wheatgrass, Sandberg's bluegrass, Thurber's needlegrass, bottlebrush squirreltail, and Idaho fescue. Silver sagebrush, creeping wildrye, and mat muhly are found in depressions. Shallow and rocky soils support scattered western juniper. The federally threatened Warner sucker fish lives in permanent, shallow, weedy lakes and spawns in Nevada's Twelvemile Creek. The Wall Canyon area supports a unique fish species, the Wall Canyon sucker. Higher elevations once supported Lahontan cutthroat trout but water availability limits their present distribution. The largest of the Northern Basin and Range subregions, the High Lava Plains covers 10,262 square miles (26,578 km^{2}) in Oregon and 5,740 square miles (14,867 km^{2}) in Nevada, featuring a variety of land uses, including rangeland, wildlife habitat, irrigated pastureland and cropland, historic gold and silver mines, and active opal mines and clay quarries. It contains the Sheldon National Wildlife Refuge and lower elevations in the Hart Mountain National Antelope Refuge. Contiguous areas in California have not been mapped yet.

=== Saltbush-Dominated Valleys (80h) ===
The Saltbush-Dominated Valleys ecoregion, externally drained by the Snake River, is composed of gently sloping valley bottoms and alluvial fans dominated by salt-tolerant vegetation that distinguishes it from the sagebrush steppe of surrounding regions. Elevation varies from 4,500 to 6,000 feet (1,372 to 1,829 m). Light-colored soils with high salt and alkali content are common; they are dry for extended periods and may be leached of salt by irrigation water. Potential natural vegetation is mostly saltbush-greasewood, featuring Nuttall sagebrush, squirreltail, shadscale, winterfat, and greasewood. Basin sagebrush, Wyoming big sagebrush, bluebunch wheatgrass, needlegrass, bluegrass, and Indian ricegrass are also present. The region covers 438 square miles (1,134 km^{2}) in Idaho and 52 square miles (130 km^{2}) in Utah, in the Raft River drainage. The land is used primarily for rangeland and irrigated agriculture.

=== Sagebrush Steppe Valleys (80i) ===
The Sagebrush Steppe Valleys ecoregion consists of gently sloping, unforested terraces, basin rims, valley bottoms, footslopes, bajadas, and alluvial fans, with an elevation of 4,600 to 6,500 feet (1,403 to 1,981 m). Less rugged than the surrounding hills and mountains, it is dominated by sagebrush grassland and lacks the woodlands, open conifer forests, and saltbush–greasewood vegetation of neighboring regions. The valleys drain mostly to the Snake River and fish assemblages are unlike those of the internally drained basins to the south. Potential vegetation includes bluebunch wheatgrass, Wyoming big sagebrush, cheatgrass, and Sandberg bluegrass. The steppe valleys are less suitable for cropland agriculture and have less available water than many parts of the Snake River Plain, but non-irrigated wheat and barley farming is common. The region covers 1,865 square miles (4,830 km^{2}) in southeastern Idaho and 7 square miles (18 km^{2}) across the Utah border.

=== Semiarid Uplands (80j) ===
The disjunct Semiarid Uplands ecoregion includes scattered hills, low mountains, volcanic cones, buttes, and rocky outcrops that rise out of the drier Dissected High Lava Plateau and High Lava Plains, as well as midelevation zones in the Hart, Steens, Owyhee, Jarbidge, and Santa Rosa mountains. Elevation varies from 4,800 to 9,700 feet (1,463 to 2,957 m). Finely textured soils support big sagebrush, low sagebrush, antelope bitterbrush, serviceberry, snowberry, mountain-mahogany, and associated grasses, such as Idaho fescue, bluebunch wheatgrass, Sandberg bluegrass, Nevada bluegrass, Great Basin wildrye, bottlebrush squirreltail, mountain brome, and Thurber needlegrass. Aspen and chokecherry are found in protected snow pockets, with willow and chokecherry in riparian areas. Rockier soils support juniper steppe woodlands. The density and extent of juniper varies over time and is dependent on long-term climate fluctuations, grazing pressure, and fire suppression. Juniper woodland is currently absent in the Jarbidge and Santa Rosa mountains, where mountain brush and scattered aspen groves occupy the woodland zone. Cold water fisheries occur in the moderate to high gradient perennial streams; threatened bull trout are found in the Jarbidge River watershed, and limited numbers of Lahontan cutthroat trout are found in the Santa Rosa range. Extensive gold mining operations continue, especially in the mountains near Jarbidge and Tuscacora. The region covers 3,151 square miles (8,161 km^{2}) in Nevada, 1,041 square miles (2,696 km^{2}) in Oregon, and 550 square miles (1,424 km^{2}) in Idaho. Public lands include the Humboldt-Toiyabe National Forest and the Hart Mountain National Antelope Refuge.

=== Partly Forested Mountains (80k) ===
The Partly Forested Mountains ecoregion occupies the elevational belt above the Semiarid Uplands on the Jarbidge, Independence, Owyhee, and Steens mountains, from 6,500 to 10,900 feet (1,981 to 3,322 m). These are partially glaciated, high, rugged mountains with glacial features including moraines, cirques, and tarn (lake)s. Perennial or intermittent, high gradient, cold streams are fed by snowmelt and springs, supporting federally threatened bull trout and Lahontan cutthroat trout in Nevada. Riffle segments have cobble or boulder substrates. Annual precipitation is sufficient to support a Great Basin pine forest community of Douglas-fir, subalpine fir, ponderosa pine, and limber pine, with whitebark pine near the tree line, and aspen stands in riparian meadows, moist draws, and wet depressions. The understory features low juniper, mountain big sagebrush, mountain brush, serviceberry, snowberry, mountain-mahogany, Idaho fescue, sheep fescue, rough fescue, bottlebrush squirreltail, prairie lupine, mountain brome, bluebunch wheatgrass, and Sandberg bluegrass. Small areas of tundra and alpine meadows are found at the highest elevations. On Steens Mountain, above the juniper woodland zone of the Semirarid Uplands, the landscape is almost treeless; broad areas of mountain big sagebrush alternate with scattered groves of aspen. Alpine areas on Steens Mountain were seriously eroded following intense grazing by domestic sheep in the late 19th century. The region covers 105 square miles (272 km^{2}) in Nevada, 103 square miles (267 km^{2}) in Oregon, and 38 square miles (98 km^{2}) in Idaho, and contains the Jarbidge Wilderness in the Humboldt-Toiyabe National Forest.

=== Salt Shrub Valleys (80l) ===
The Salt Shrub Valleys ecoregion is composed of arid basins formerly inundated by Pleistocene lakes. Elevation varies from 3,500 to 5,200 feet (1,067 to 1,585 m) The nearly flat to gently sloping basins and playas are poorly drained, have a high water table, and retain water seasonally. They are flanked by bajadas and alluvial fans. The region also contains wetlands, hot springs, terraces, dunes, and a few hills. Soils, climate, and vegetation are transitional to the Central Basin and Range to the south. Characteristically, the basin floors have strongly saline and very alkaline soils that support black greasewood, inland saltgrass, bud sagebrush, shadscale, alkali sacaton, rushes, basin wildrye, bottlebrush squirreltail, and cheatgrass. Alluvial fans and hills support Wyoming big sagebrush, spiny hopsage, rabbitbrush, Thurber needlegrass, Indian ricegrass, Sandberg bluegrass, and bottlebrush squirreltail. The region covers 725 square miles (1,878 km^{2}) in Oregon and 355 square miles (919 km^{2}) in Nevada, including a small part of the Sheldon National Wildlife Refuge.

=== Barren Playas (80m) ===
The Barren Playas ecoregion includes the playas and sand dunes of Summer Lake, Silver Lake, and the Alvord Desert, three of the most arid areas in Oregon. Elevation varies from 4,500 to 5,000 feet (1,372 to 1,524 m), with a local relief of less than 100 feet (30 m). On the playas, lake levels and salinity fluctuate seasonally and yearly. Playas are ponded during wet intervals and eroded by wind when dry. Surface material is clayey, saline, alkaline, and poorly drained. Sand dunes and mud flats occur. This region is mostly barren; vegetation, where present, is sparse and composed of very salt-tolerant plants, such as alkali sacaton and black greasewood. The region covers 179 square miles (464 km^{2}) in Oregon. It is nonarable and is used for recreation and migratory bird habitat.

== Gallery ==
=== Flora ===
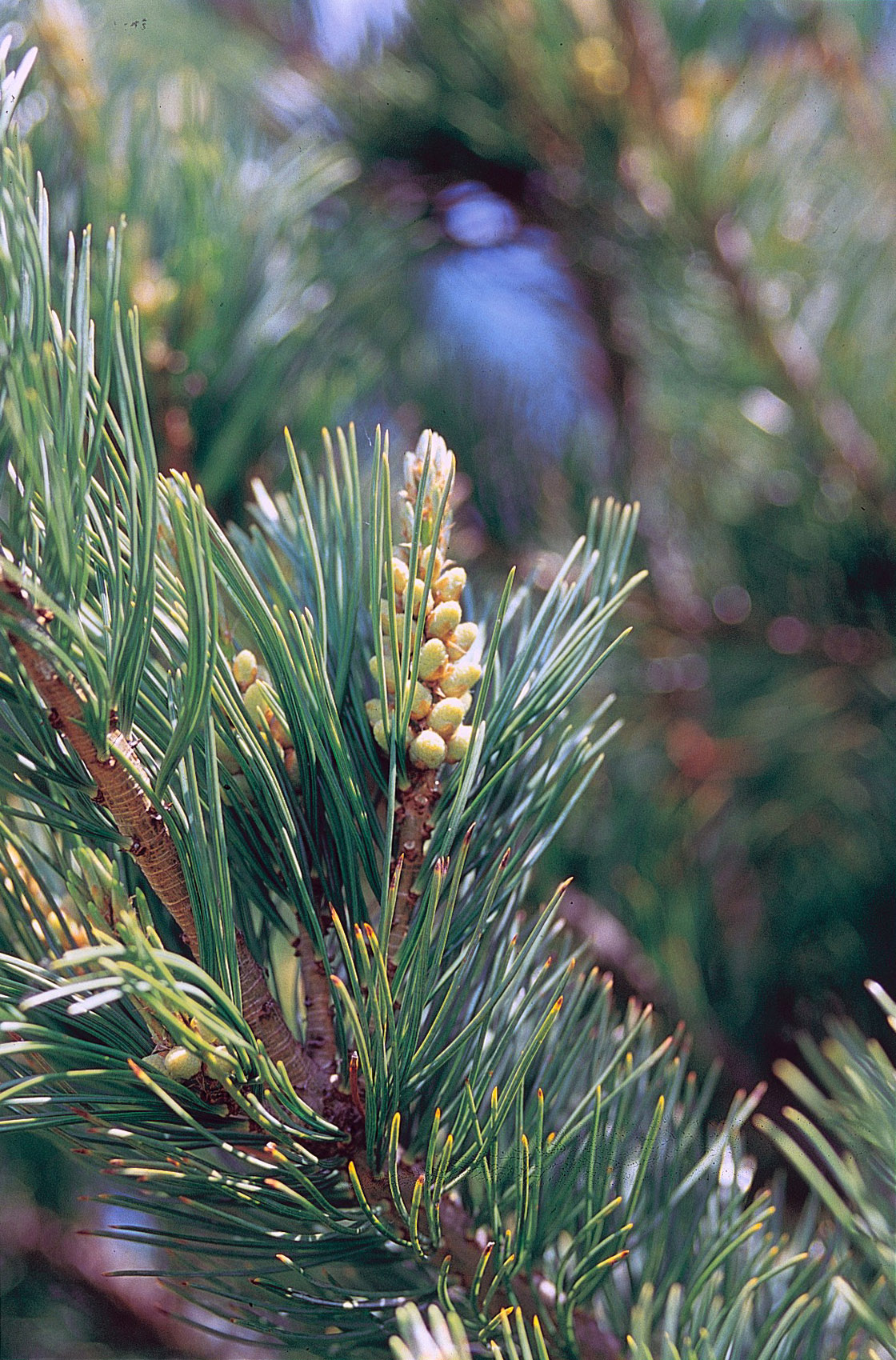
Limber pine

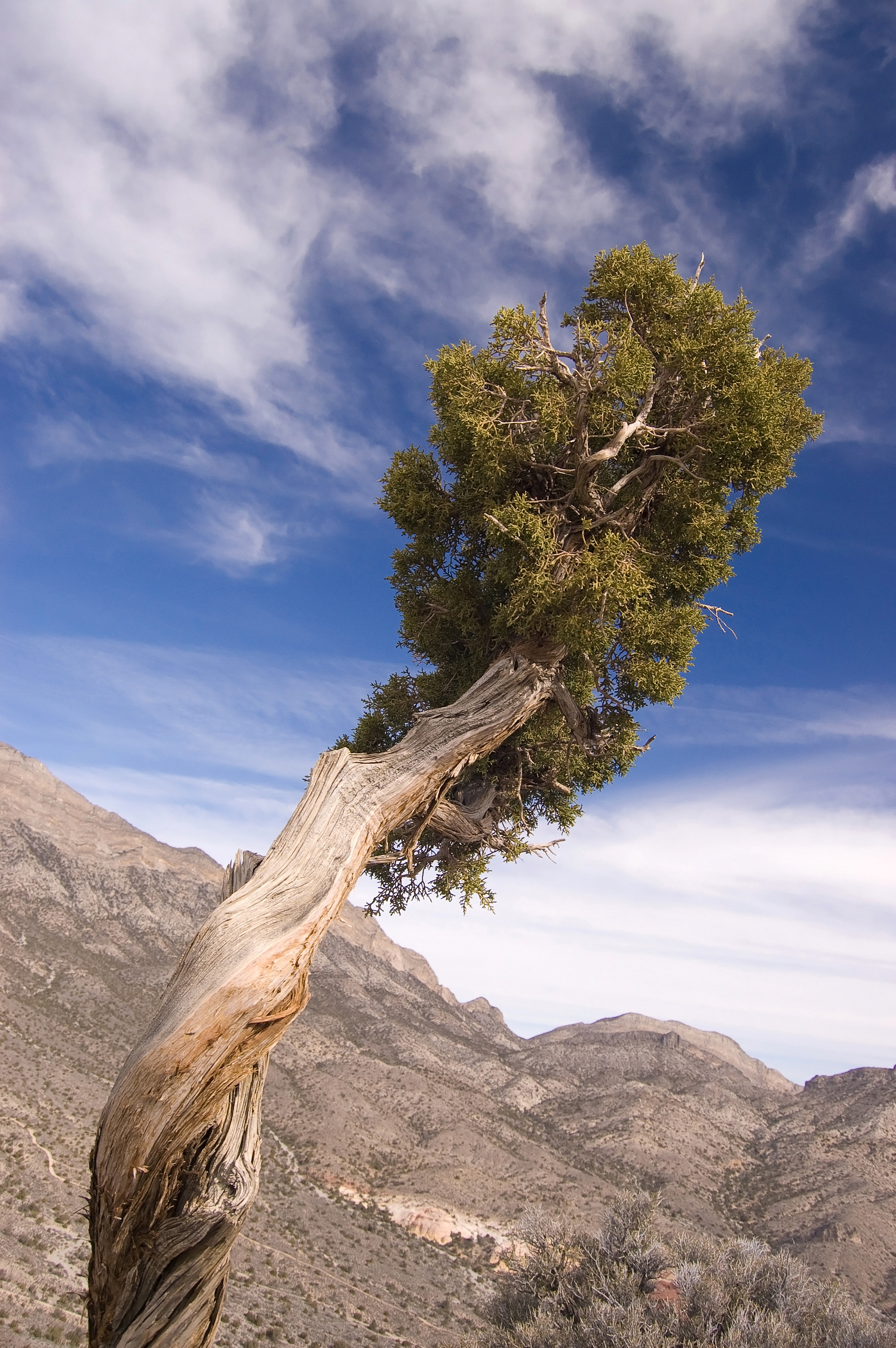
Utah juniper

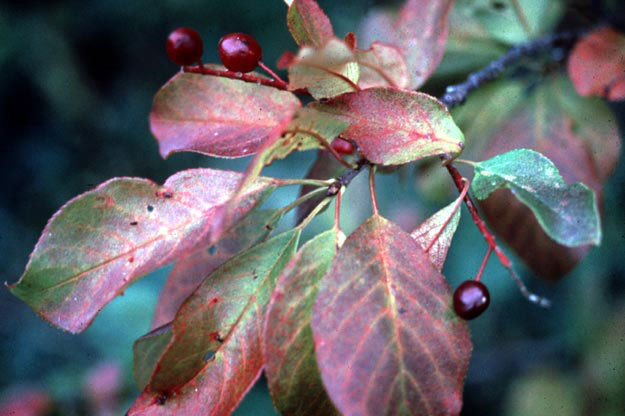
Western chokecherry leaves and berries

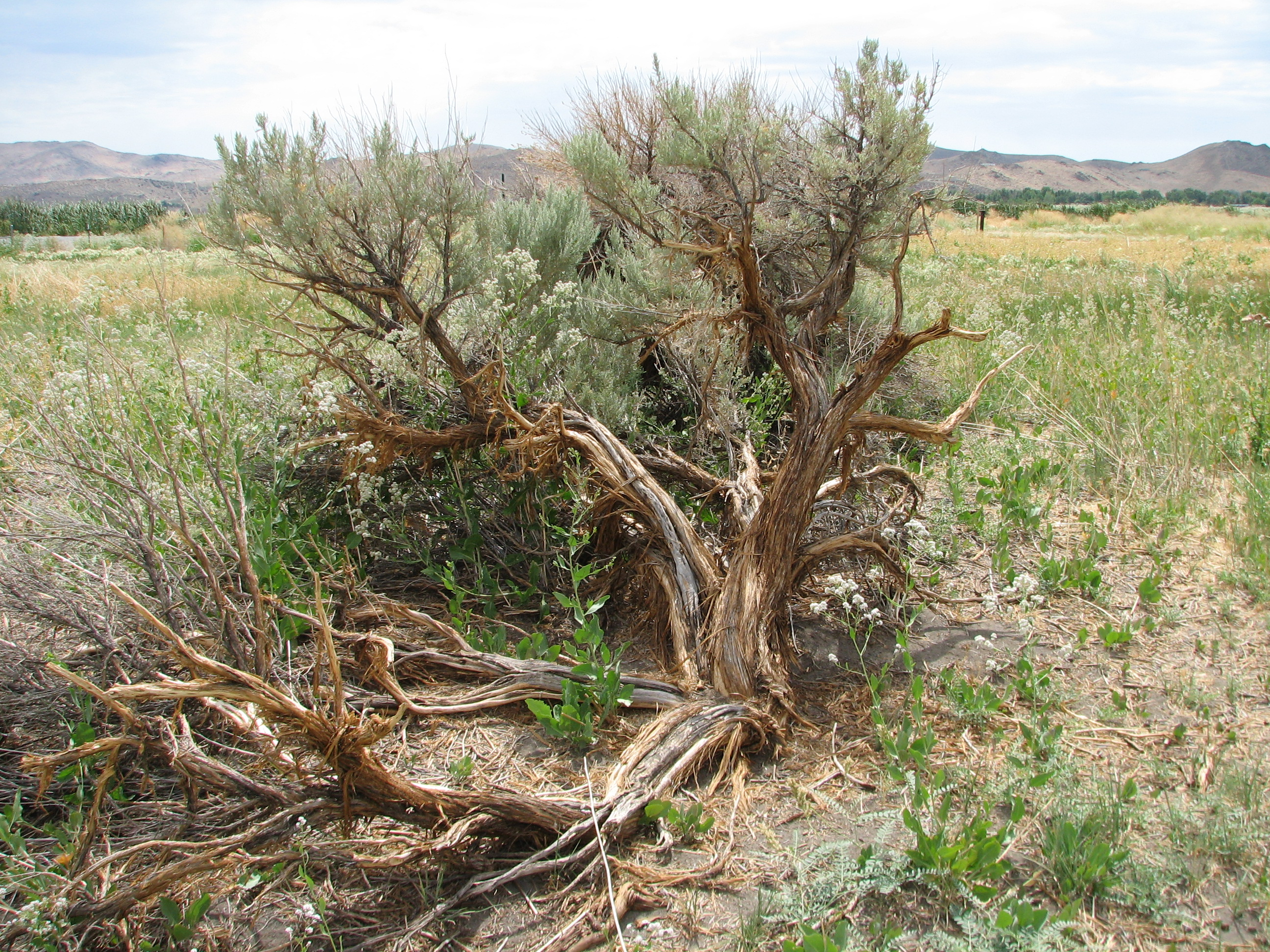
Big sagebrush

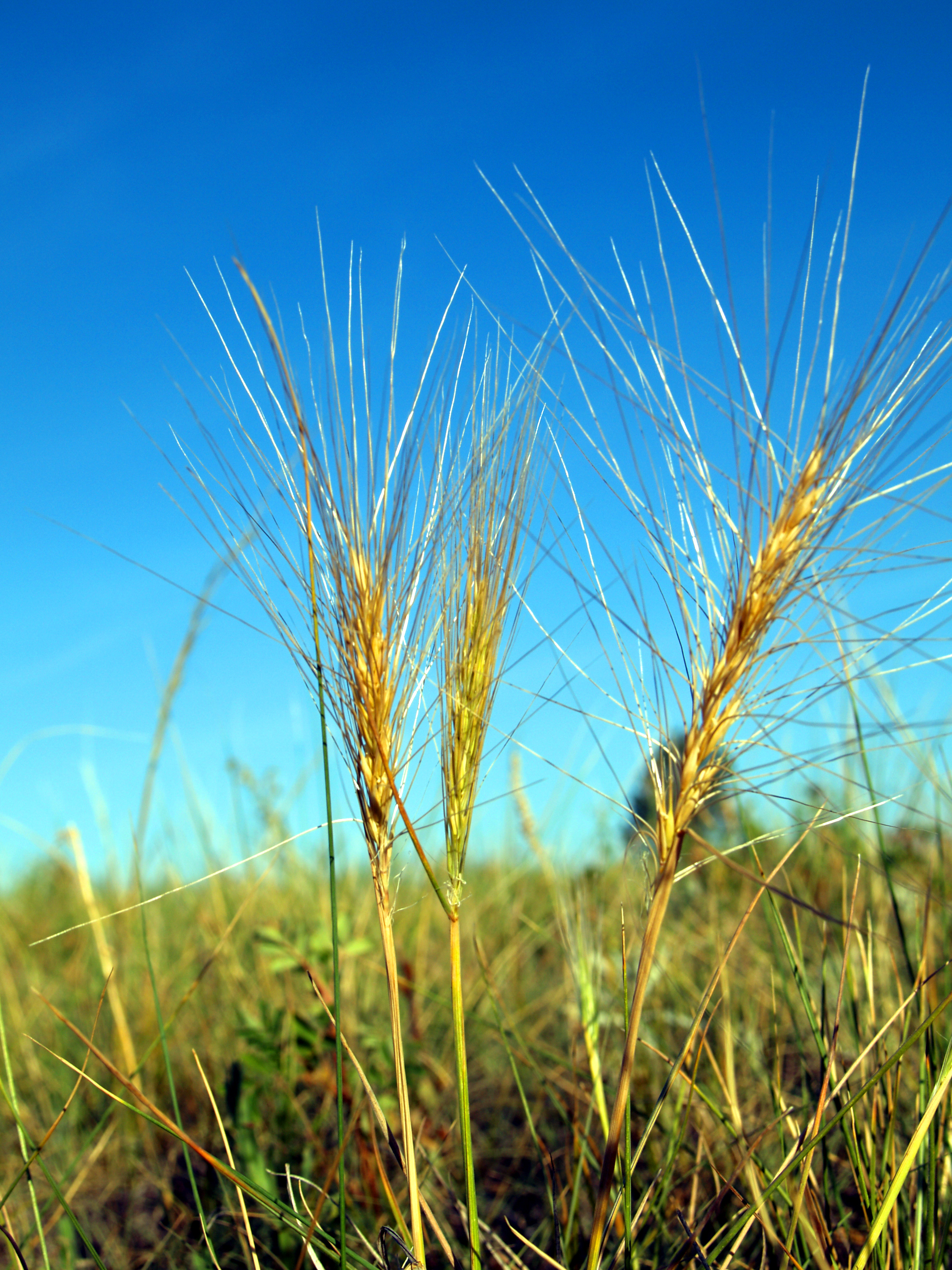
Bottlebrush squirreltail

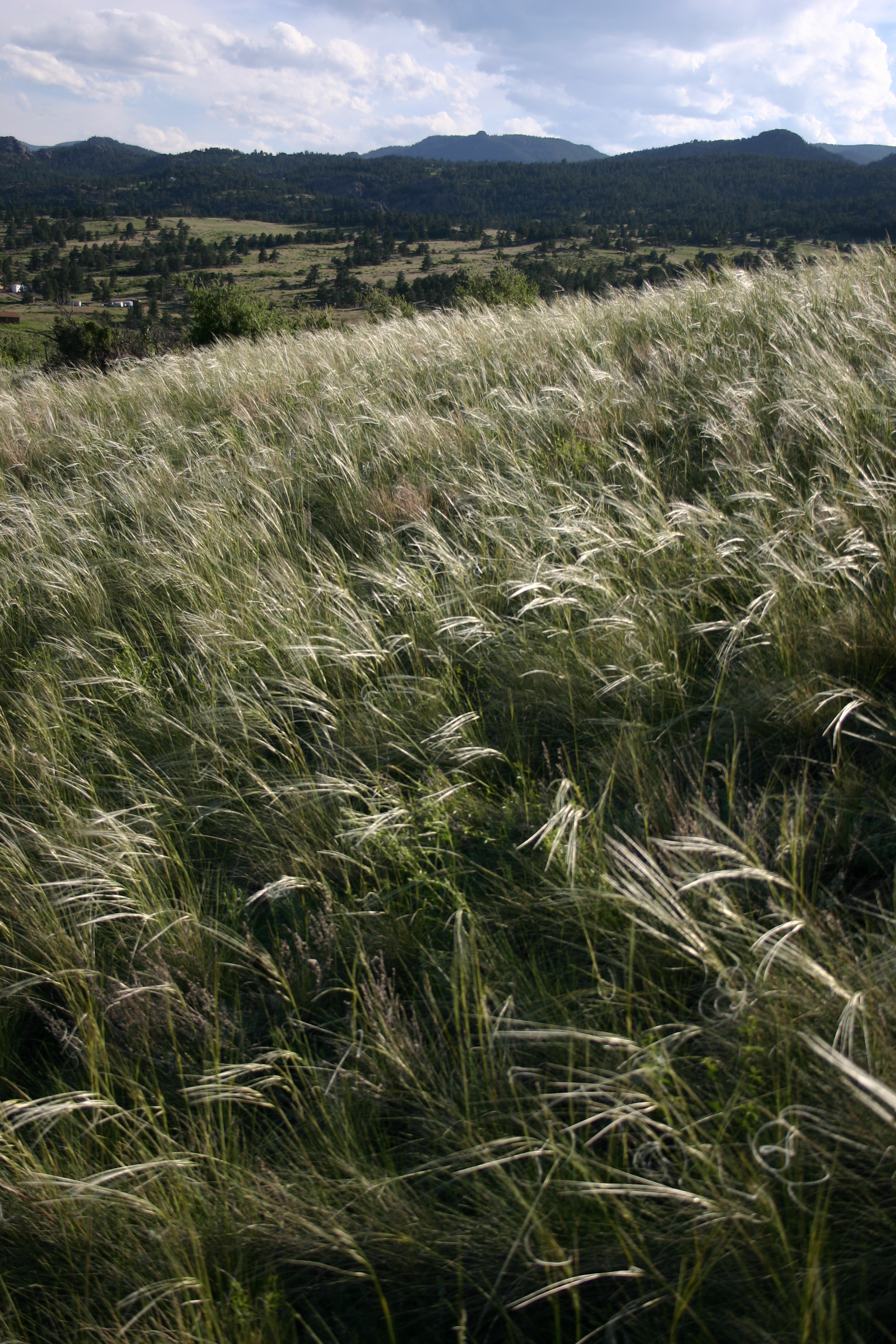
Needle-and-thread grass

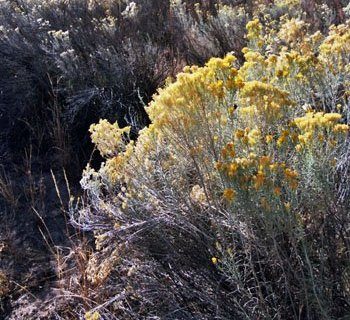
Rubber rabbitbrush

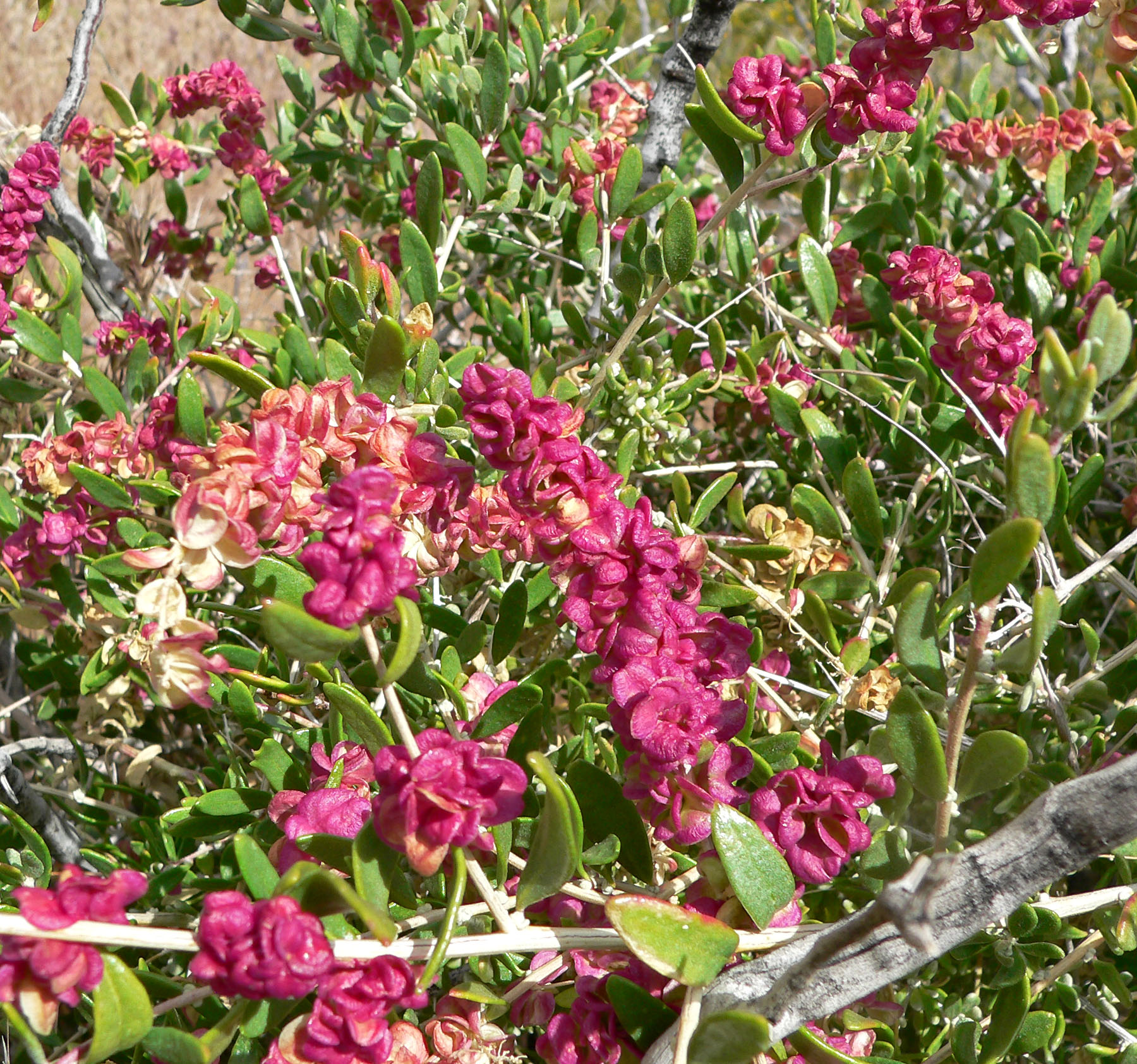
Spiny hopsage

=== Fauna ===
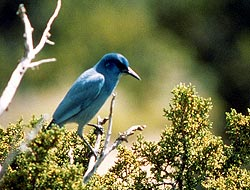
Pinyon jay, found in juniper-pinyon woodlands

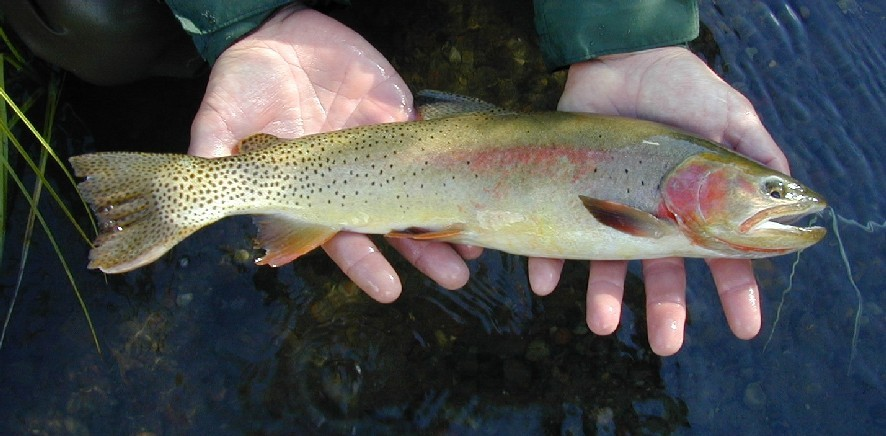
Yellowstone cutthroat trout in the Snake River system

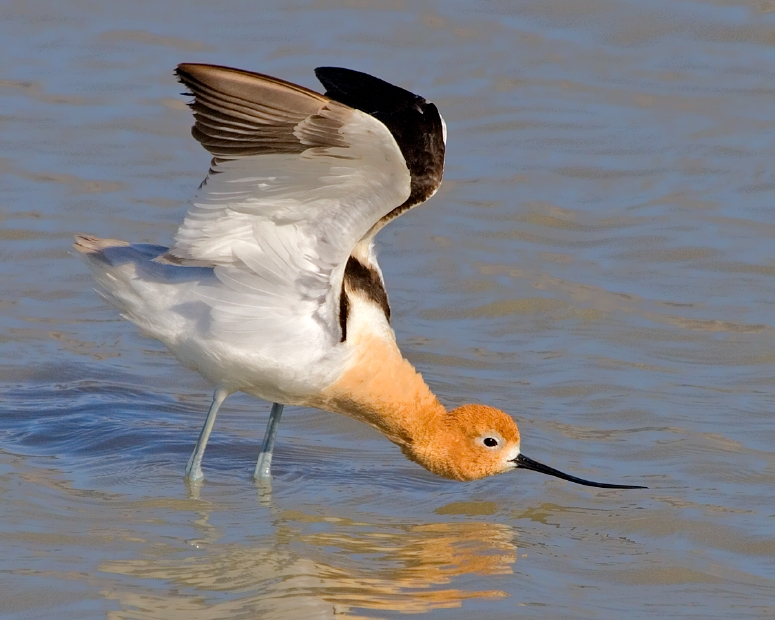
American avocet at Summer Lake

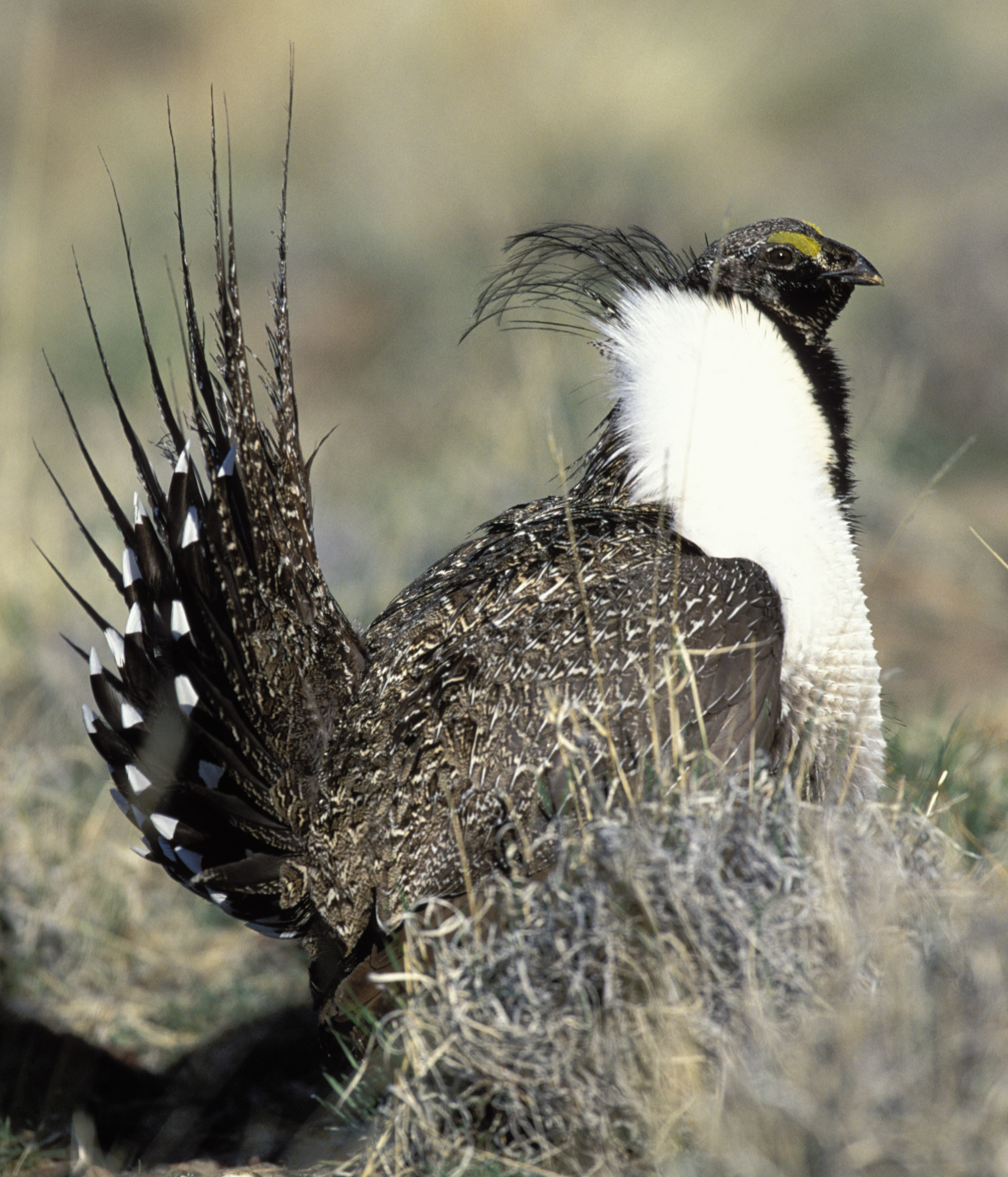
Sage grouse in shrub-steppe habitat

=== Landscapes ===
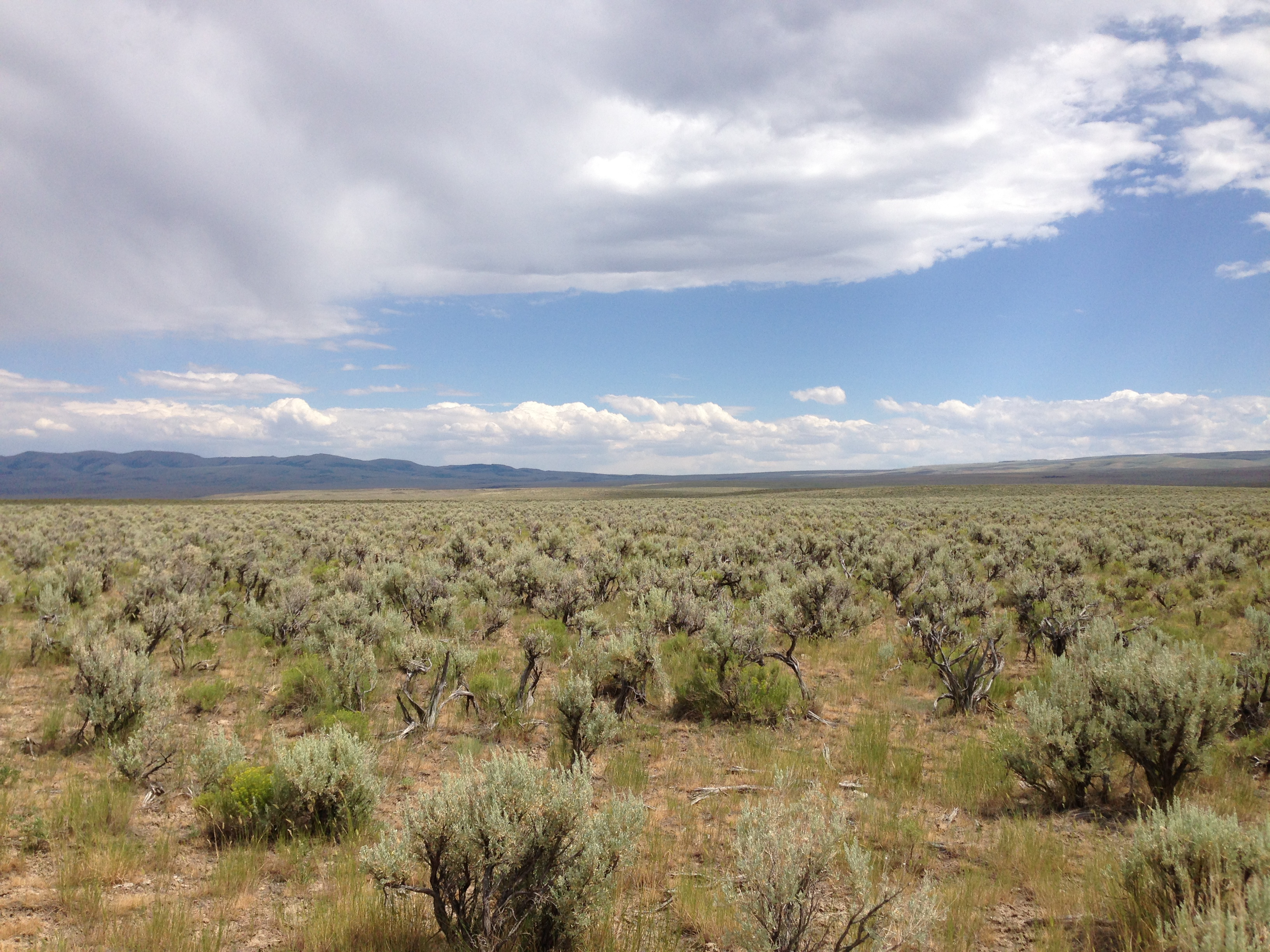
Sagebrush-Steppe in south-central Idaho along Three Creek Road

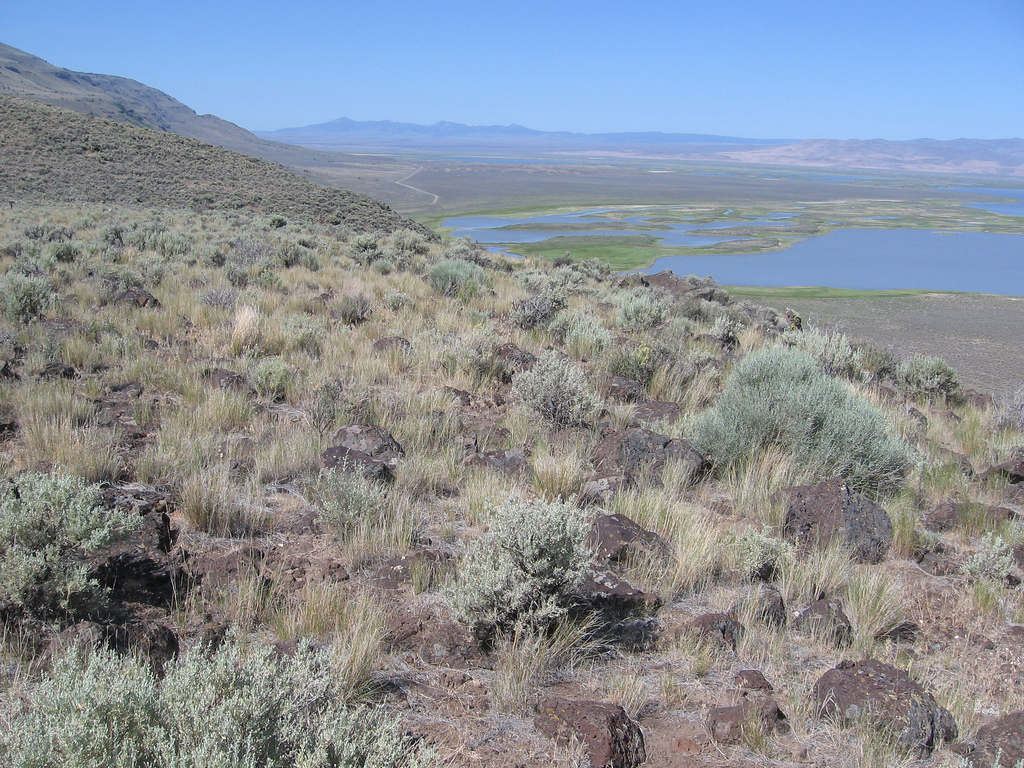
Bunchgrasses on Hart Mountain

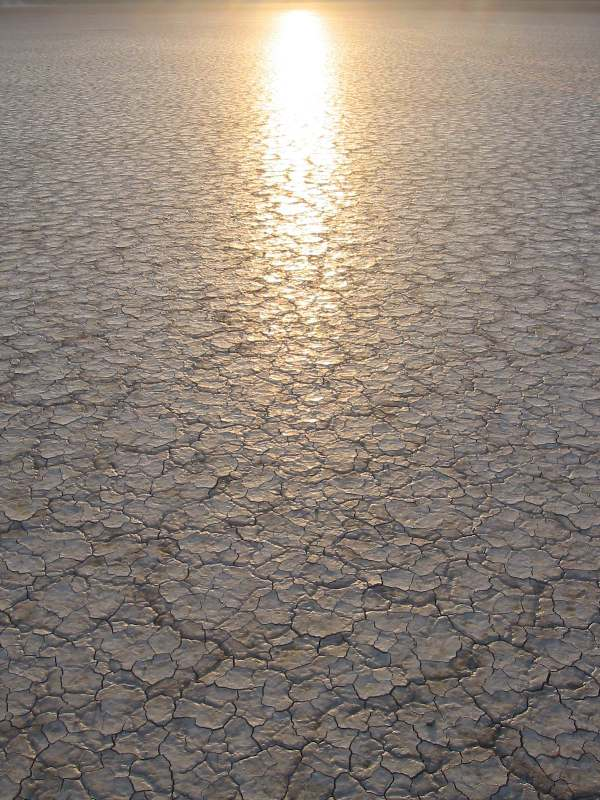
The cracked playa surface of the Alvord Desert

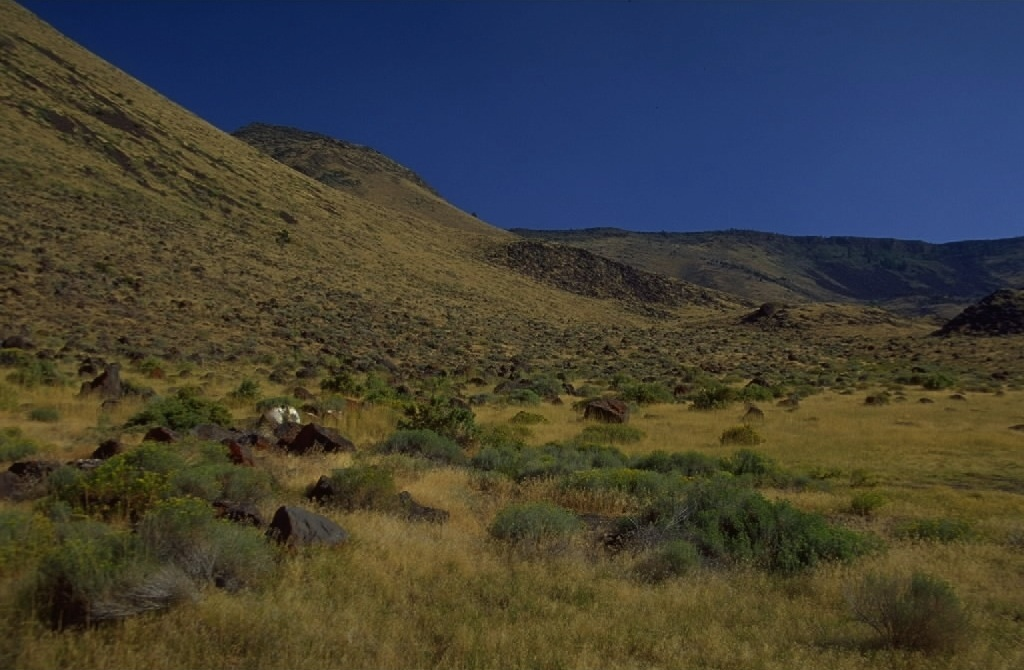
Cheatgrass covers the fault scarp of Abert Rim.

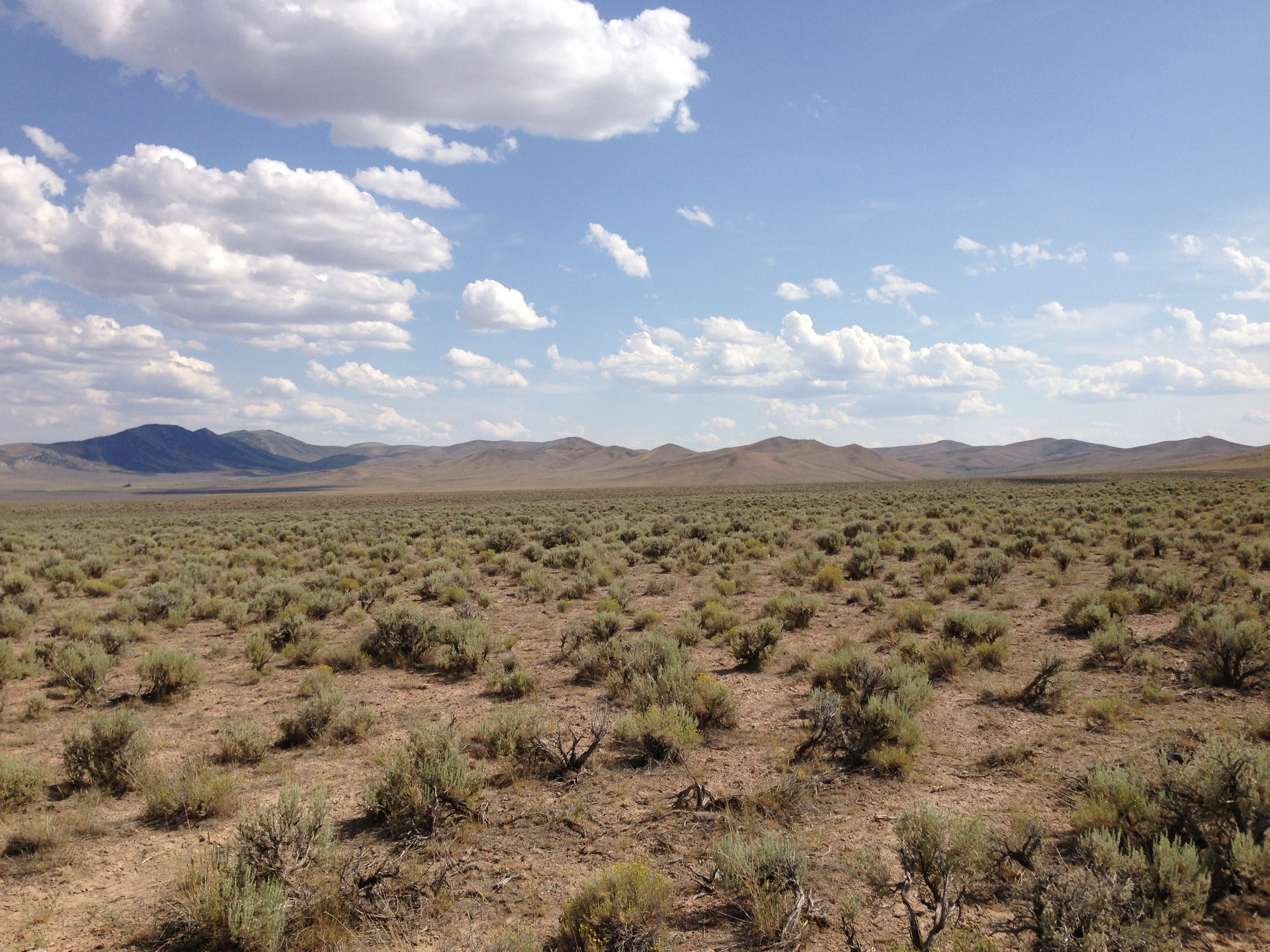
Sagebrush steppe in northeastern Nevada along US 93

== See also ==
- Ecoregions defined by the EPA and the Commission for Environmental Cooperation:
  - List of ecoregions in North America (CEC)
  - List of ecoregions in the United States (EPA)
  - List of ecoregions in Oregon
- The conservation group World Wildlife Fund maintains an alternate classification system:
  - List of ecoregions (WWF)
  - List of ecoregions in the United States (WWF)
- Colloquial terms for the region:
  - Basin and Range (disambiguation)
  - Basin and Range Province
