= Little Jacks Creek =

Little Jacks Creek may refer to:

- Little Jacks Creek, New South Wales, a locality in Australia
- Little Jacks Creek (Idaho), a tributary of Jacks Creek (Bruneau River)
