= Orbicular =

Orbicular is an adjective meaning "circular"

Orbicular may also refer to:

- Orbicular leaf, a plant leaf shape
- Orbicularis oculi muscle, a muscle around the eye
- Orbicularis oris muscle, a muscle around the mouth
- Orbicular batfish, a species of fish
- Caracanthus, the orbicular velvet fishes
- Orbicular granite, a rock type
- Orbicular jasper, a variety of jasper
- Orbicular stigma, a spot on wings of certain moths
