= Jasper =

Chalcedony variety colored by iron oxide

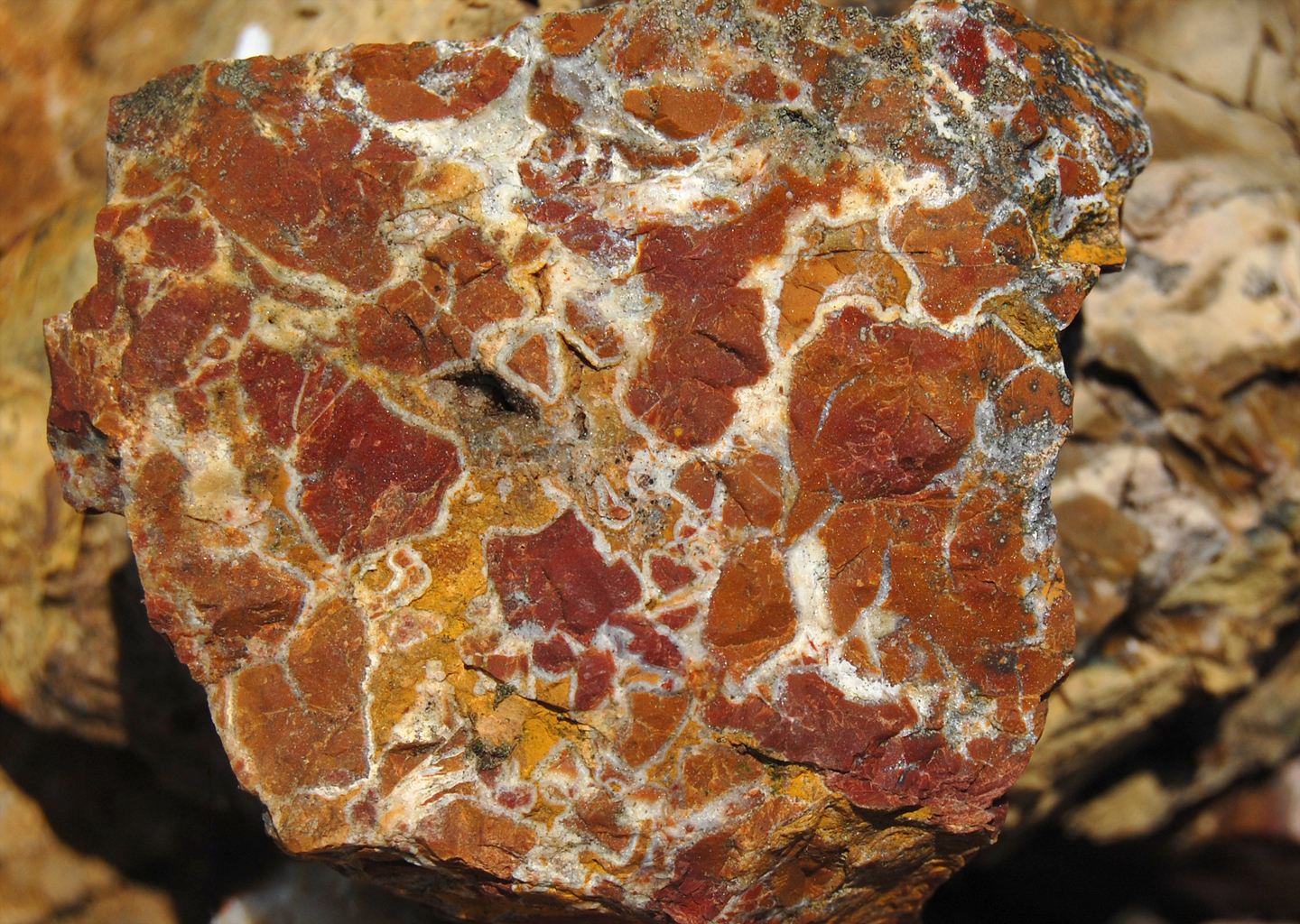
- Jasper outcrop, Bucegi Mountains, Romania

General
- Category: Aggregate rock (impure chalcedony variety)
- Formula: SiO_{2} (with varying impurities)
- Crystal system: Hexagonal

Identification
- Colour: Most commonly red, but may be yellow, brown, green or (rarely) blue
- Crystal habit: Massive
- Cleavage: none
- Fracture: Conchoidal
- Mohs scale hardness: 6.5–7
- Luster: Vitreous
- Diaphaneity: Opaque
- Specific gravity: 2.5–2.9
- Refractive index: 1.54–2.65
- Birefringence: 0.009

Jasper is an opaque type of silica that comes in a variety of colors, most commonly red, yellow, brown, green, and very rarely blue. It is made mostly of very fine-grained quartz or chalcedony, with other minerals contributing to its color and appearance. The common reddish color is due to iron inclusions. Jasper breaks with a smooth surface and is used for ornamentation or as a gemstone. It can be highly polished and is used for items such as vases, jewelry, seals, and snuff boxes. The density of jasper is typically 2.5 to 2.9 g/cm^{3}. Jaspillite is a banded-iron-formation rock that often has distinctive bands of jasper.

== Etymology and history ==
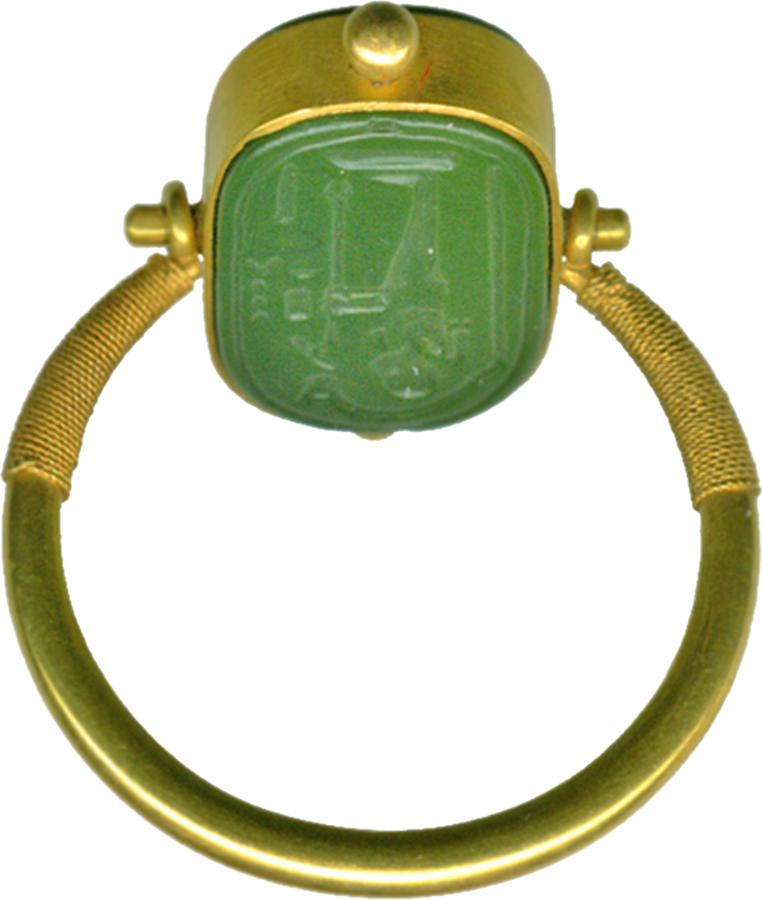
Movable Egyptian ring in green jasper and gold, from 664 to 322 BC or later (Late Period), the Walters Art Museum

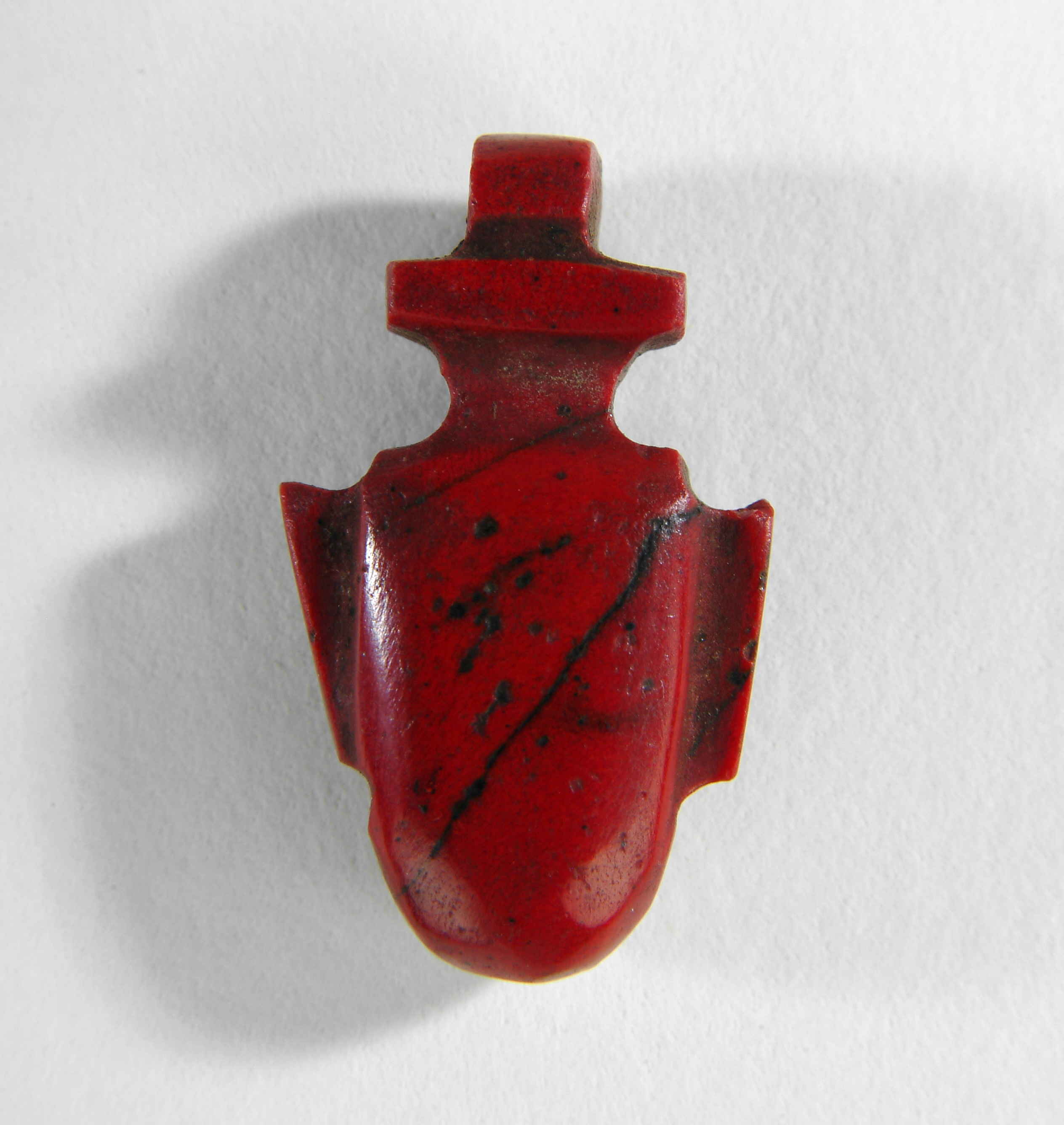
Amulet of scarlet jasper, provenance unknown, Royal Pump Room, Harrogate

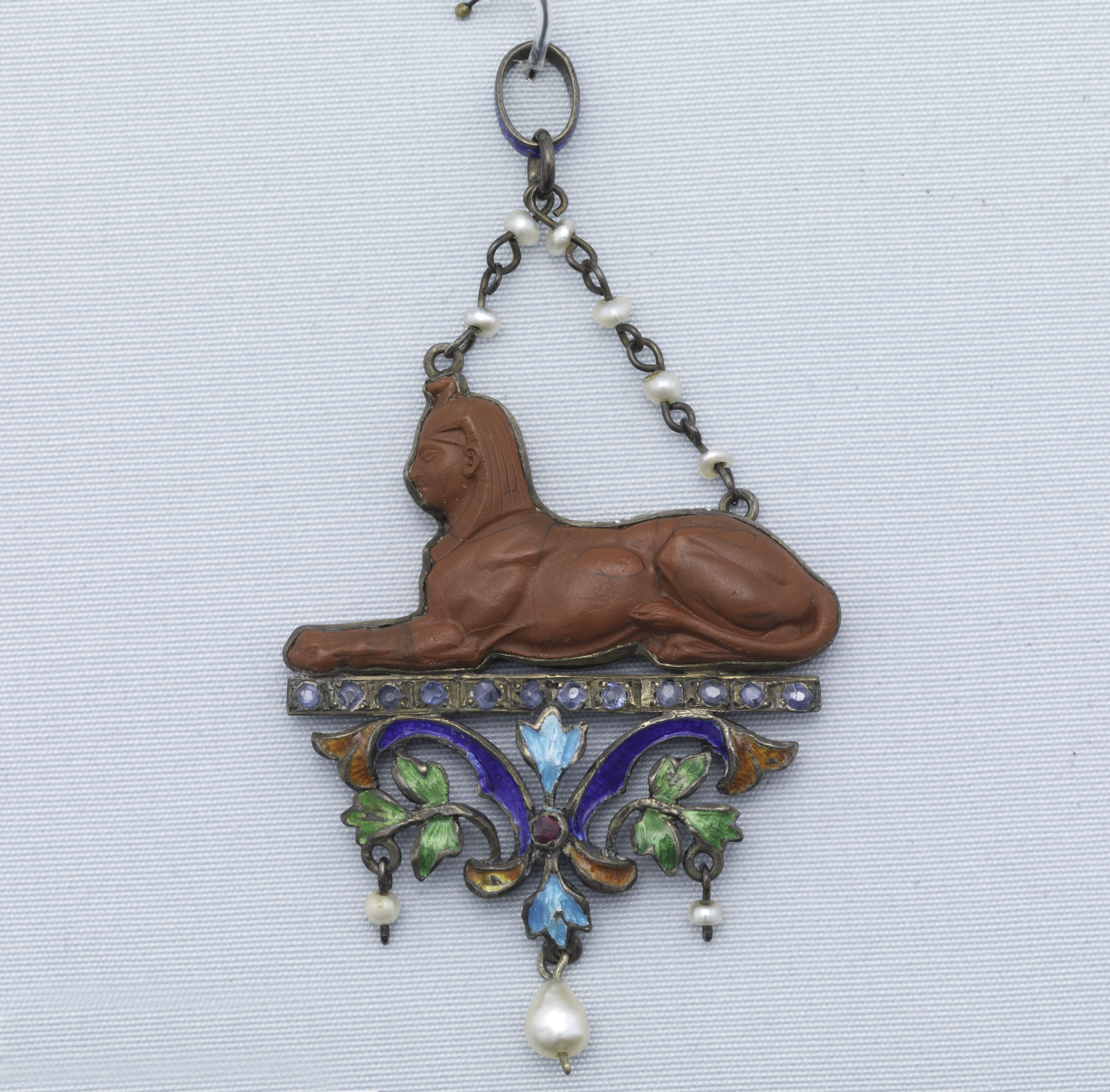
Low-relief sphinx pendant, red jasper, pearl and enamel, French, circa 1870

The name means "spotted or speckled stone," and is derived via Old French jaspre (variant of Anglo-Norman jaspe) and Latin iaspidem (nom. iaspis) from Greek ἴασπις iaspis (feminine noun), from an Afroasiatic language (cf. Hebrew ישפה yashpeh, Akkadian yashupu). This Semitic etymology is believed to be unrelated to that of the English given name Jasper, which is of Persian origin, (Note: "Jasper: The usual English form of the name assigned in Christian folklore to one of the three magi or 'wise men', who brought gifts to the infant Christ at his birth (Matthew 2:1). The name [Jasper] does not appear in the Bible, and is first found in medieval tradition. It seems to be ultimately of Persian origin, from a word meaning 'treasurer'. There is probably no connection with the English vocabulary word jasper denoting a gemstone, which is of Semitic origin." — Hanks, Hardcastle, & Hodges (2006)) though the Persian word for the mineral jasper is also yashum (یَشم).

Green jasper was used to make bow drills in Mehrgarh between 4th and 5th millennium BC. Jasper is known to have been a favorite gem in the ancient world; its name can be traced back in Arabic, Persian, Hebrew, Assyrian, Greek and Latin. On Minoan Crete, jasper was carved to produce seals circa 1800 BC, as evidenced by archaeological recoveries at the palace of Knossos.

Although the term jasper is now restricted to opaque quartz, the ancient iaspis was a stone of considerable translucency including nephrite. The jasper of antiquity was in many cases distinctly green, for in ancient documents it is often compared to emerald and other green objects. Jasper is referred to in the Nibelungenlied as being clear and green. The jasper of the ancients probably included stones which would now be classed as chalcedony, and the emerald-like jasper may have been akin to the modern chrysoprase. The Hebrew word may have designated a green jasper. Flinders Petrie suggested that the odem – the first stone on the High Priest's breastplate – was a red jasper, whilst tarshish, the tenth stone, may have been a yellow jasper. (Note: Hastings's Dict. Bible. 1902, cited in Encyclopædia Britannica (1911)..)

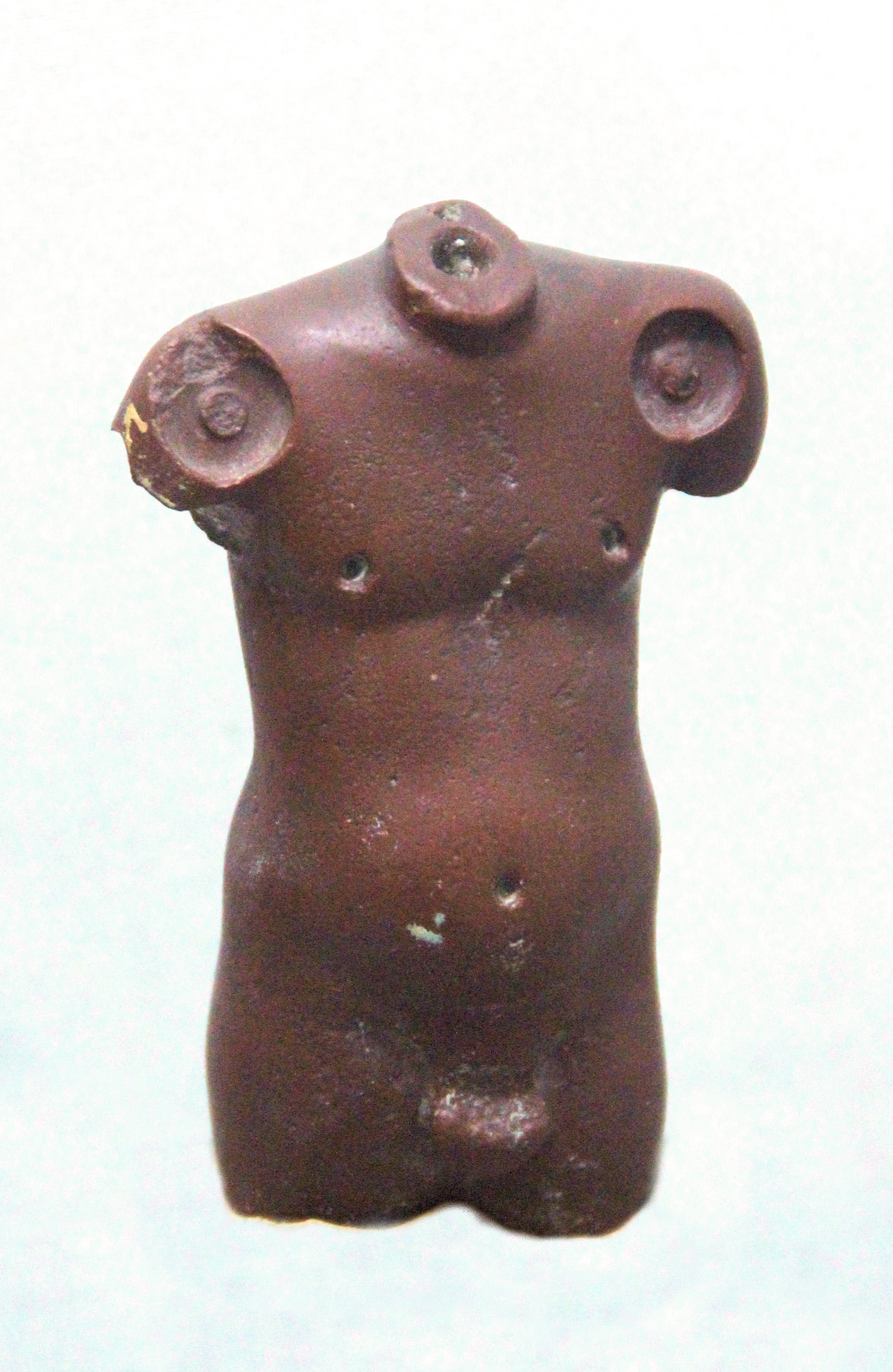
Male torso carved from red jasper, Bronze Age, Harappa, Indus Valley civilisation, Pakistan

== Types ==
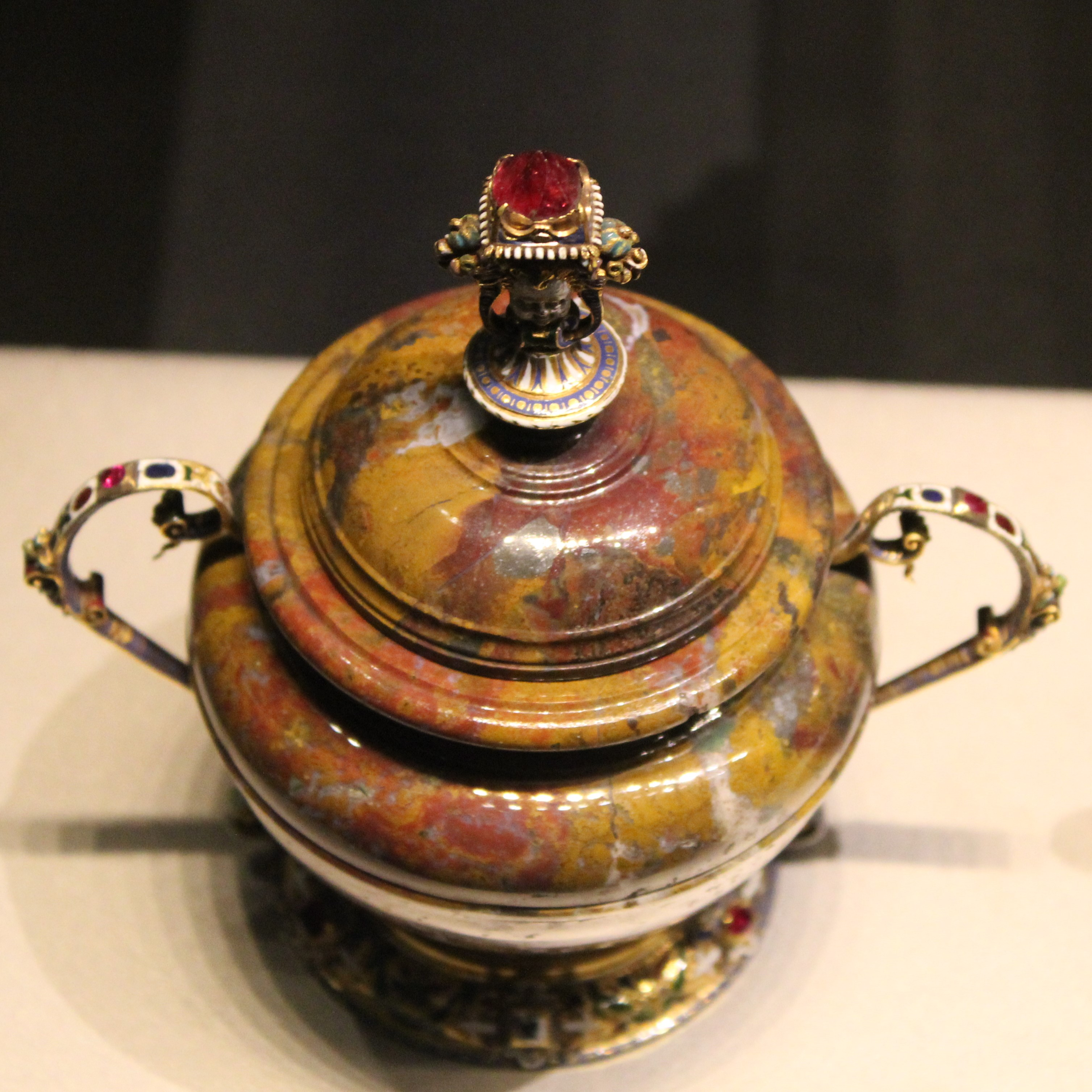
Jewel-set vase carved from red-and-yellow jasper. Probable provenance: German, early 17th century, Waddesdon Bequest, British Museum

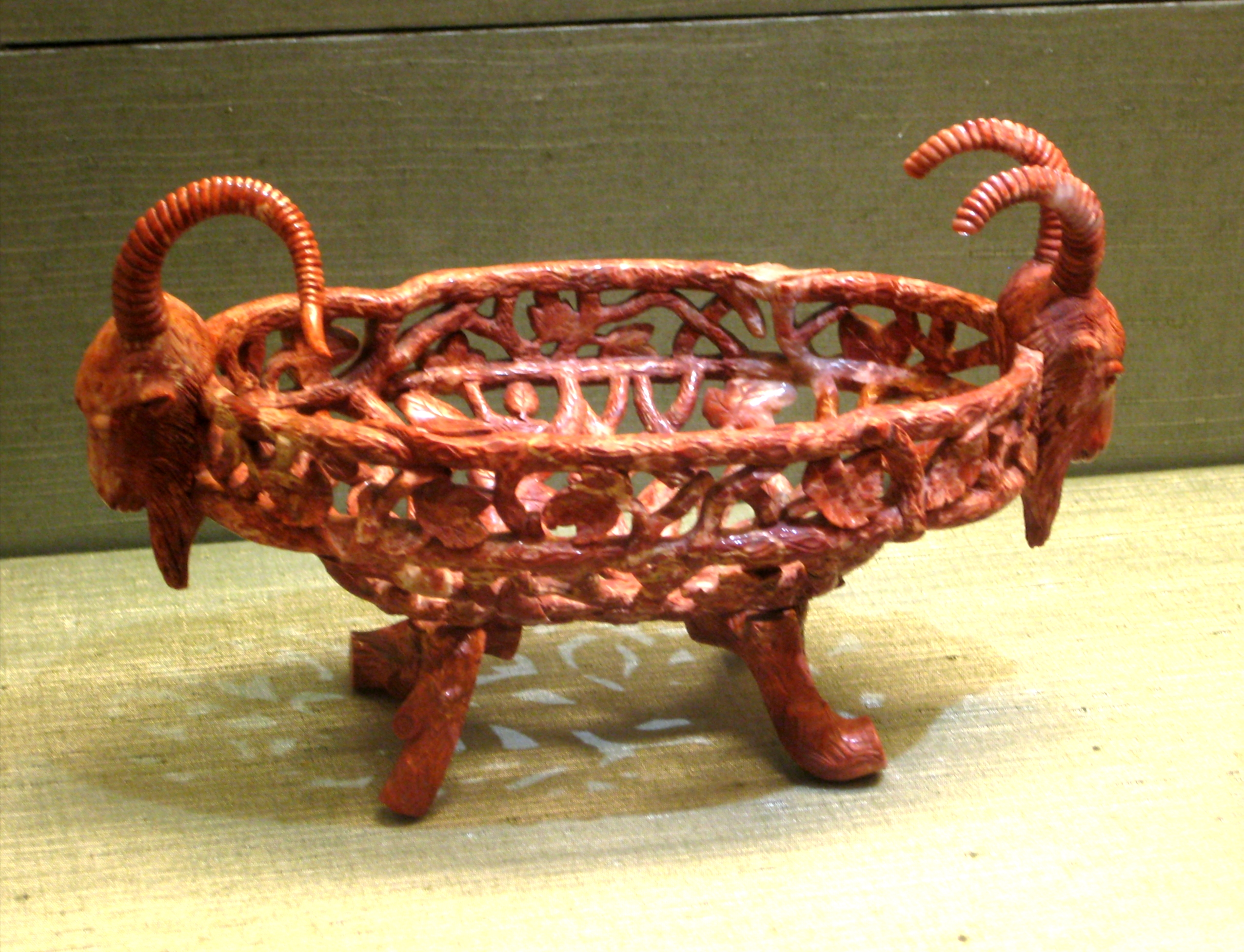
Goat-headed basket carved from red jasper. Russian, late 19th century, Kremlin Armoury

Jasper is an opaque rock of virtually any colour stemming from the mineral content of the original sediments or ash. Patterns arise during the consolidation process forming flow and depositional patterns in the original silica-rich sediment or volcanic ash. Hydrothermal circulation is generally thought to be required in the formation of jasper.

Jasper can be modified by the diffusion of minerals along discontinuities providing the appearance of vegetative growth, i.e., dendritic. The original materials are often fractured and/or distorted, after deposition, into diverse patterns, which are later filled in with other colorful minerals. Weathering, with time, will create intensely colored superficial rinds.

The classification and naming of jasper varieties presents a challenge. Terms attributed to various well-defined materials includes the geographic locality where it is found, sometimes quite restricted such as "Bruneau" (a canyon) and "Lahontan" (a lake), rivers and even individual mountains; many are fanciful, such as "forest fire" or "rainbow", while others are descriptive, such as "autumn" or "porcelain". A few are designated by the place of origin such as a brown Egyptian or red African.

=== Banded iron formations ===
Jasper is the main component in the silica-rich parts of banded iron formations (BIFs) which indicate low, but present, amounts of dissolved oxygen in the water such as during the Great Oxidation Event or Snowball Earth. The red bands are microcrystalline red chert, also called jasper.

=== Picture jaspers ===
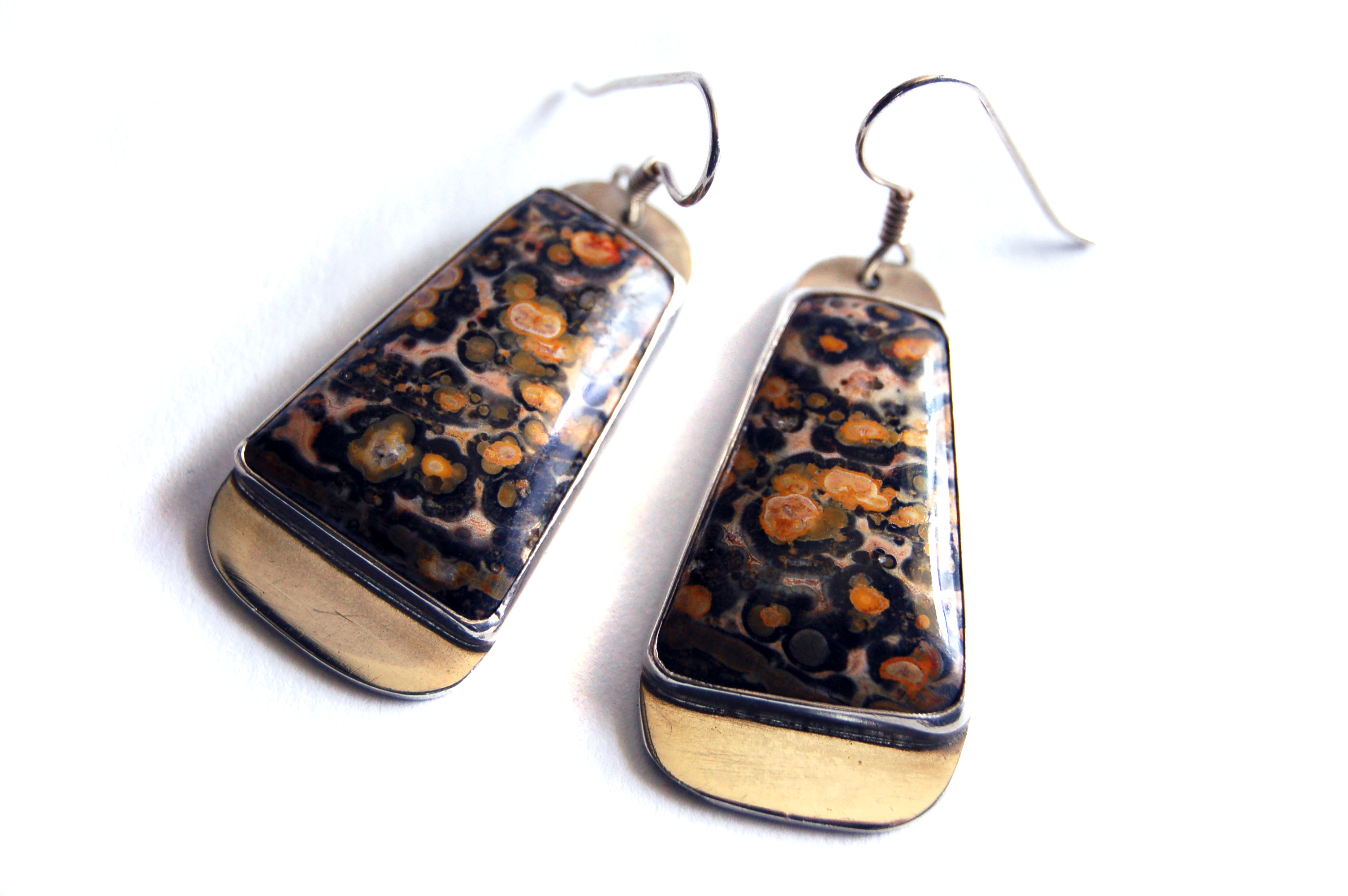
Earrings of polished "leopard-spot jasper" (actually a type of spherulitic rhyolite)

Picture jaspers exhibit combinations of patterns resulting in what appear to be scenes or images, when seen on a cut section. Such patterns include banding from flow or depositional patterns (from water or wind), as well as dendritic or color variations. Diffusion from a center produces a distinctive orbicular appearance, i.e., leopard skin jasper or linear banding from a fracture as seen in liesegang jasper. Healed, fragmented rock produces brecciated (broken) jasper.

While these "picture jaspers" occur all over the world, specific colors or patterns are unique to the geographic region from which they originate. One source of the stone is Indonesia, especially in Purbalingga district. From the US, Oregon's Biggs jasper and Idaho's Bruneau jasper from the Bruneau River canyon are particularly fine examples. Other examples can be seen at Ynys Llanddwyn in Wales. A blue-green jasper occurs in a deposit at Ettutkan Mountain, Staryi Sibay, Bashkortostan, Russia. (The town of Sibay, in the far south of the Ural Mountains, near the border with Kazakhstan, is noted for its colossal, open-cast copper mine.)

=== Basanite and other types of touchstone ===
Basanite is a deep velvety-black variety of amorphous quartz, of a slightly tougher and finer grain than jasper, and less splintery than hornstone. It was the Lydian stone or touchstone of the ancients. It is mentioned and its use described in the writings of Bacchylides about 450 BC, and was also described by Theophrastus in his book On Stones (Ancient Greek title: Περὶ λίθων: Peri Lithon), a century later. It is evident that the touchstone that Pliny had in mind when he wrote about it was merely a dense variety of basalt.

Basanite (not to be confused with bassanite), Lydian stone, and radiolarite (a.k.a. lydite or flinty slate) are terms used to refer to several types of black, jasper-like rock (also including tuffs, cherts and siltstones) which are dense, fine-grained and flinty / cherty in texture and found in a number of localities. The "Lydian Stone" known to the Ancient Greeks is named for the ancient kingdom of Lydia in what is now western Turkey. A similar rock type occurs in New England. Such rock types have long been used for the making of touchstones to test the purity of precious metal alloys, because they are hard enough to scratch such metals, which, if drawn (scraped) across them, show to advantage their metallic streaks of various (diagnostic) colours, against the dark background.

There are two distinct materials known as basanite: one is a black variety of jasper, while the other is a black volcanic rock closely related to basalt. Furthermore, various fine-grained black stones have historically been utilised as touchstones. Given this overlap in nomenclature and physical appearance, there is significant potential for ambiguity within the fields of petrology and mineralogy. There is an alkaline rich mafic igneous rock with the name Basanite.

== Gallery ==
Varieties

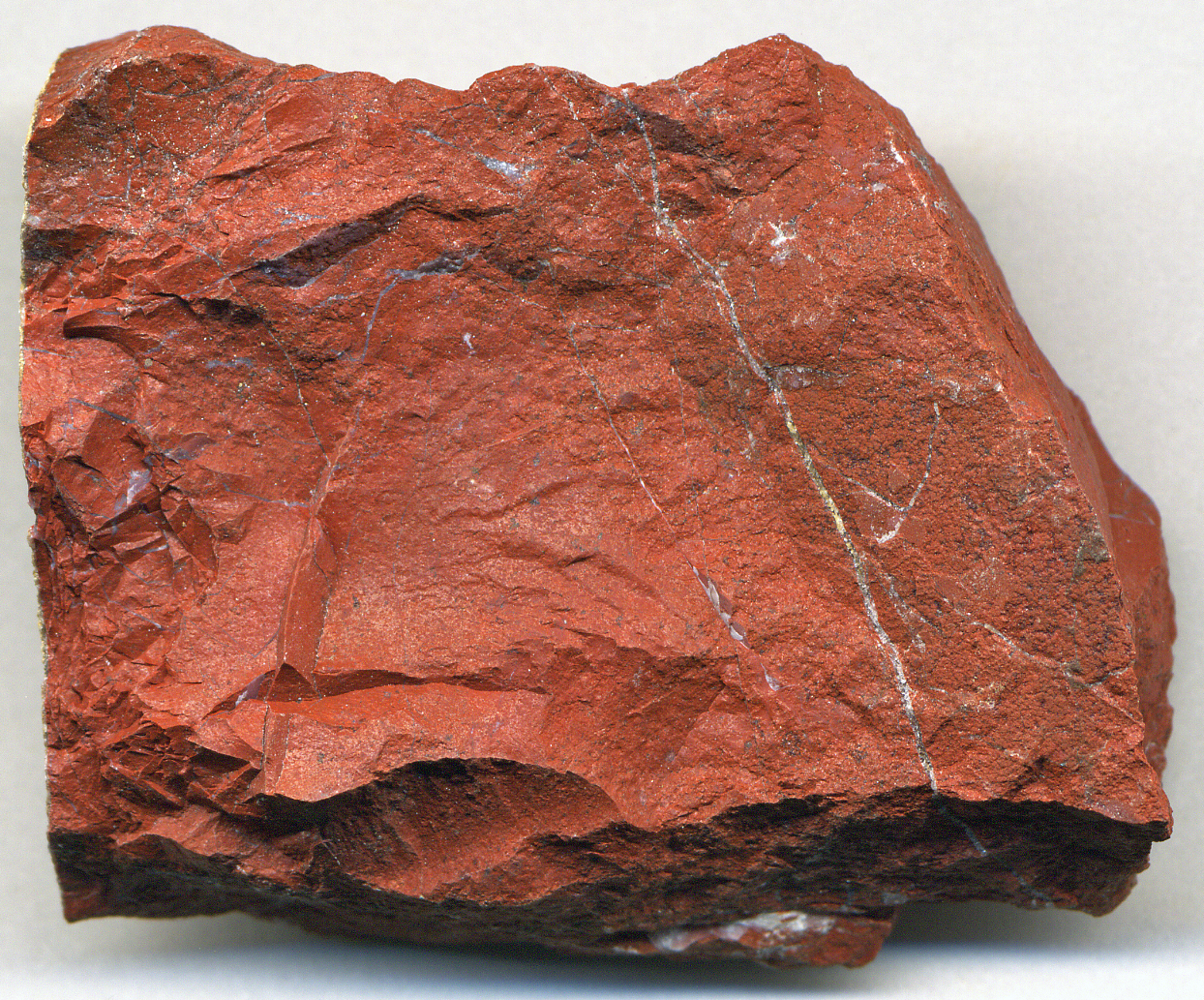
Red jasper rough, Cave Creek, Arizona

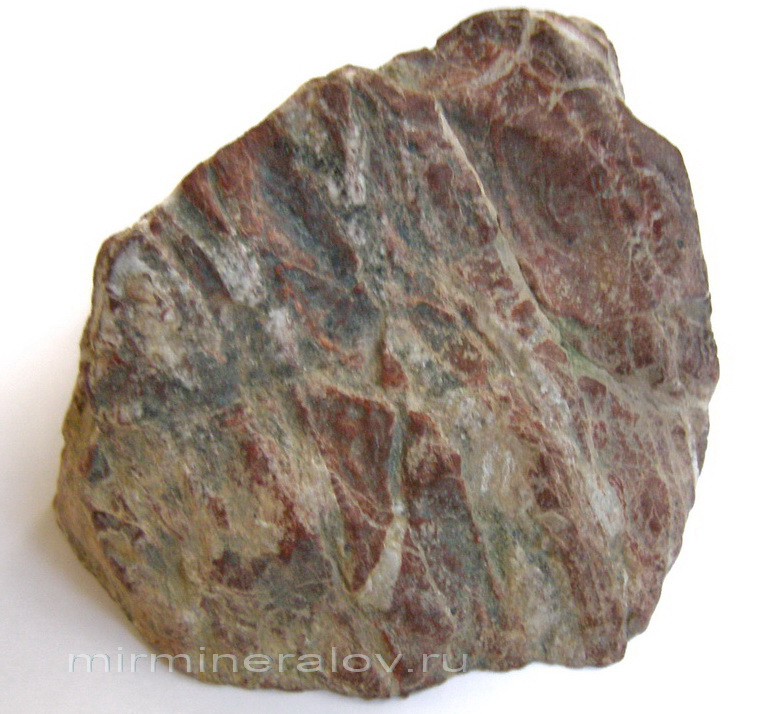
Dull red jasper veined with white quartz, rough, provenance: uncertain – possibly Crimea or Kyrgyzstan

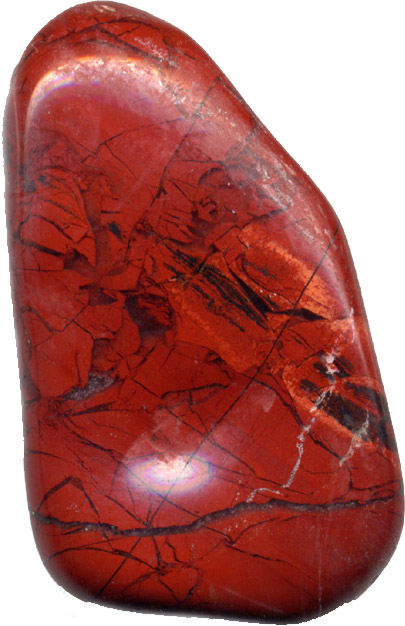
Brecciated red jasper tumbled smooth, 1 in (2.5 cm)

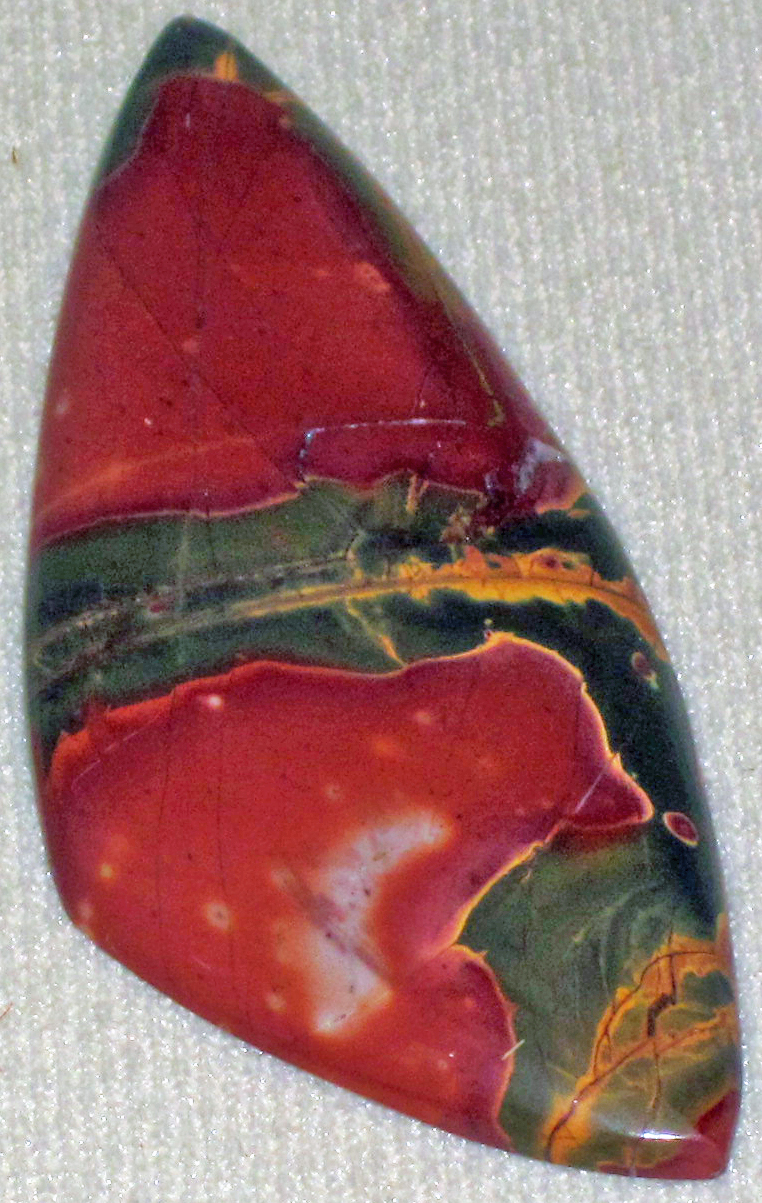
Red-green-and-yellow jasper cabochon, Cherry Creek, China

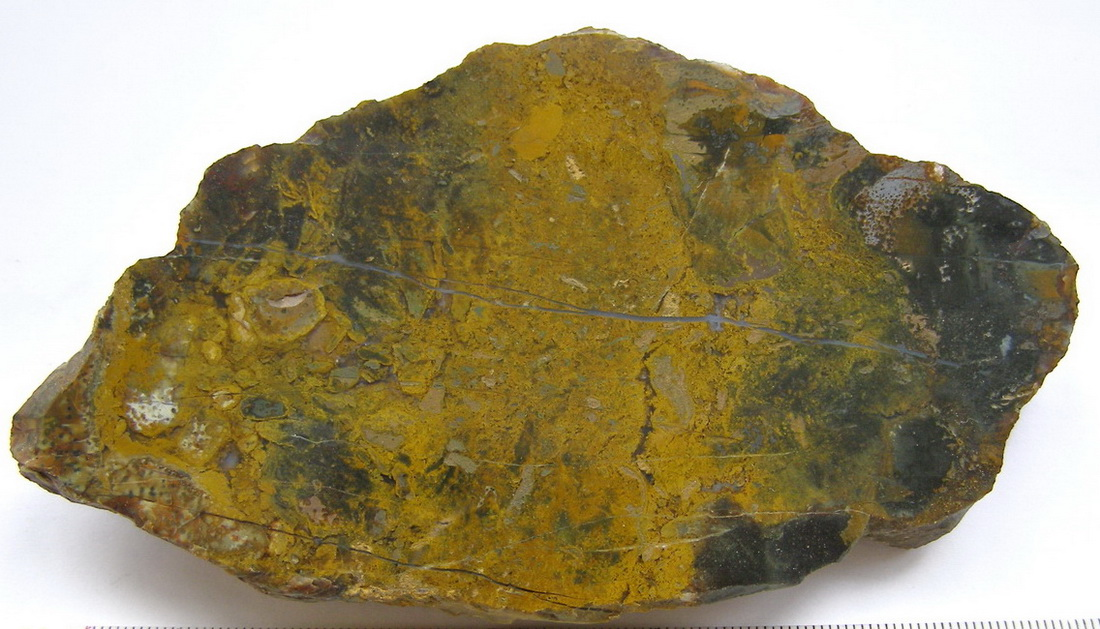
Brecciated yellow-and-green jasper, cut and polished, Kara Dag, Crimea

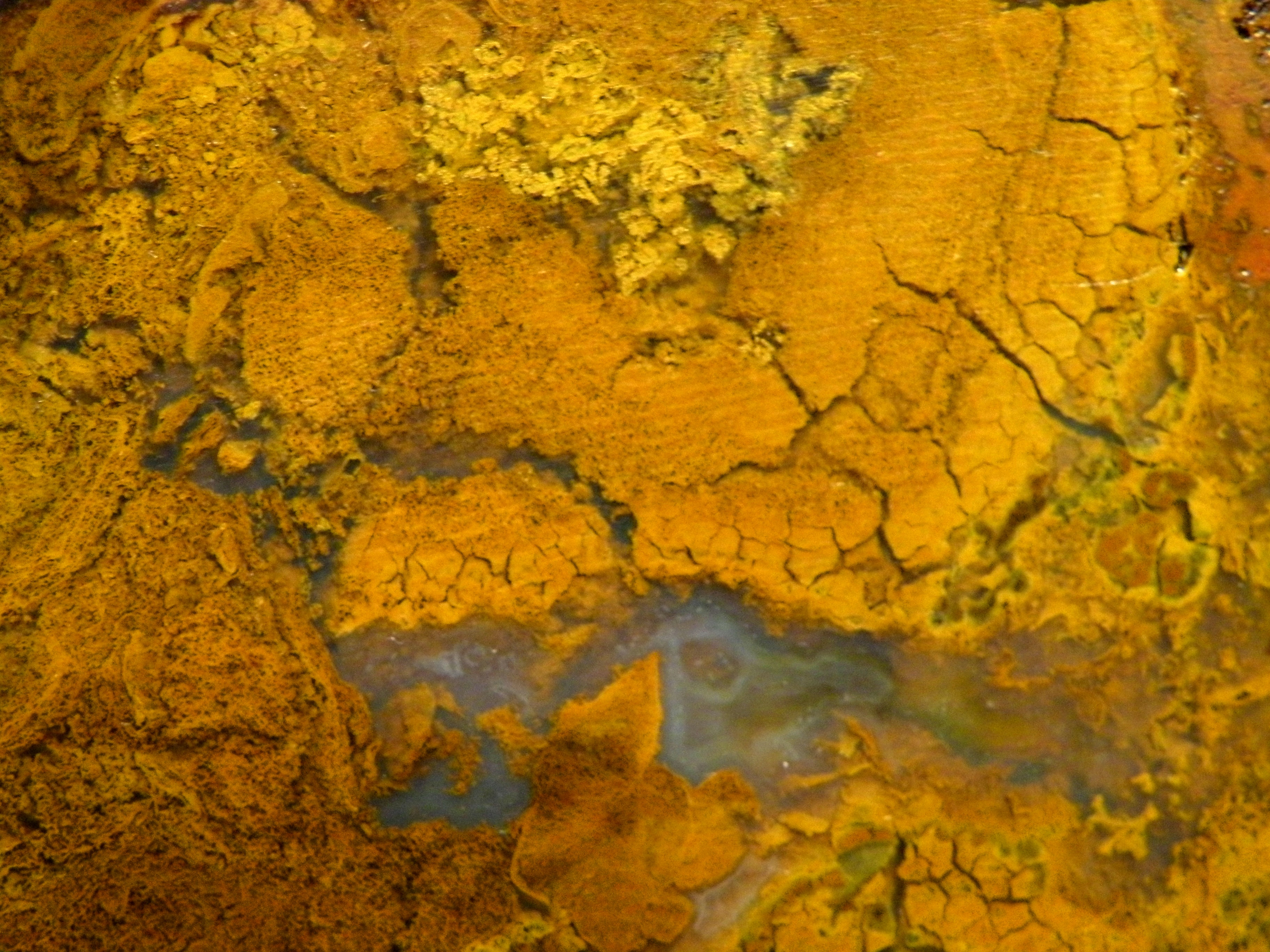
Brecciated yellow jasper, cut and oiled

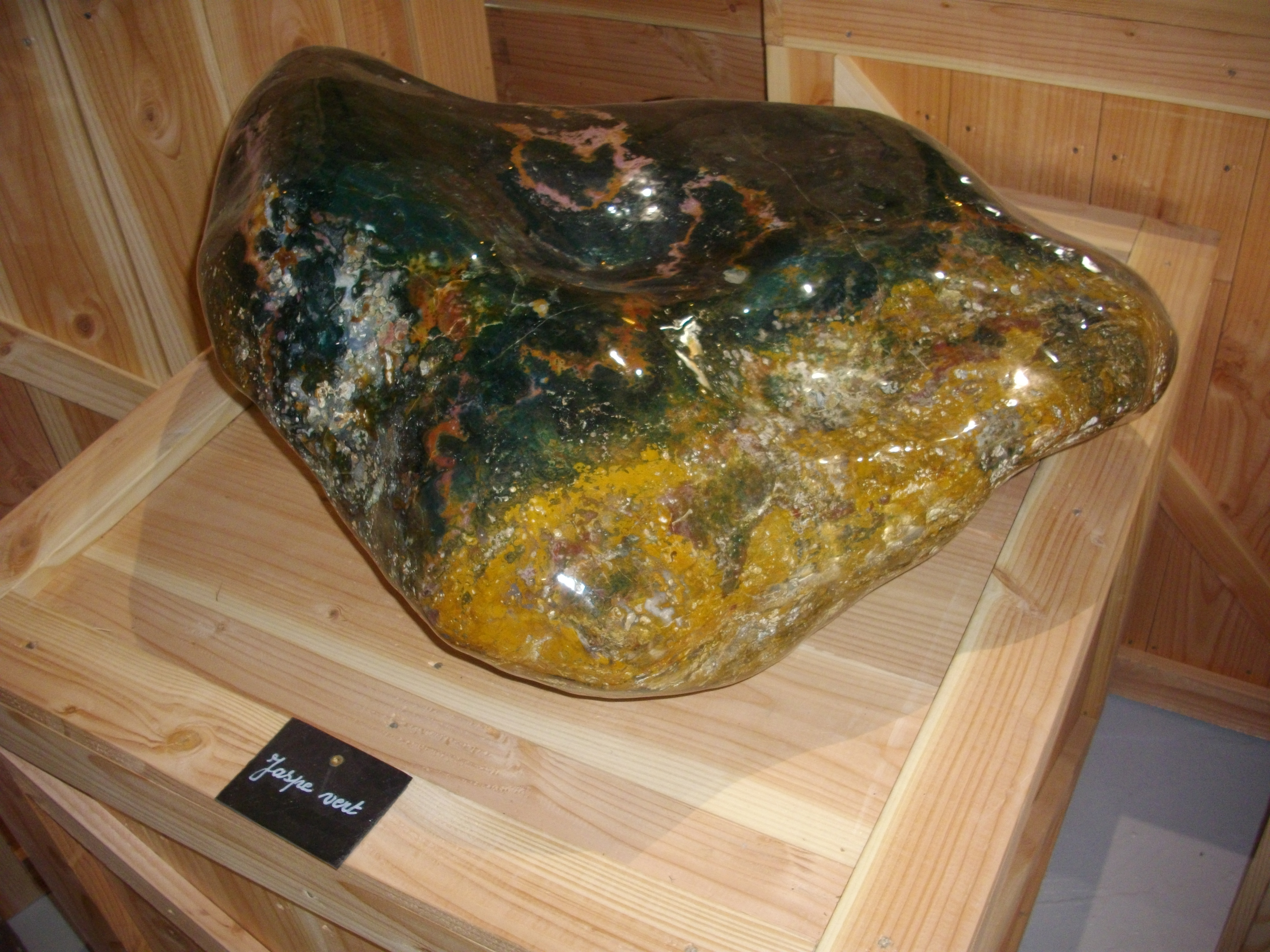
Green-yellow-and-orange polished jasper boulder, Tropical Parc, musée des mineraux, Saint-Jacut-les-Pins, Brittany

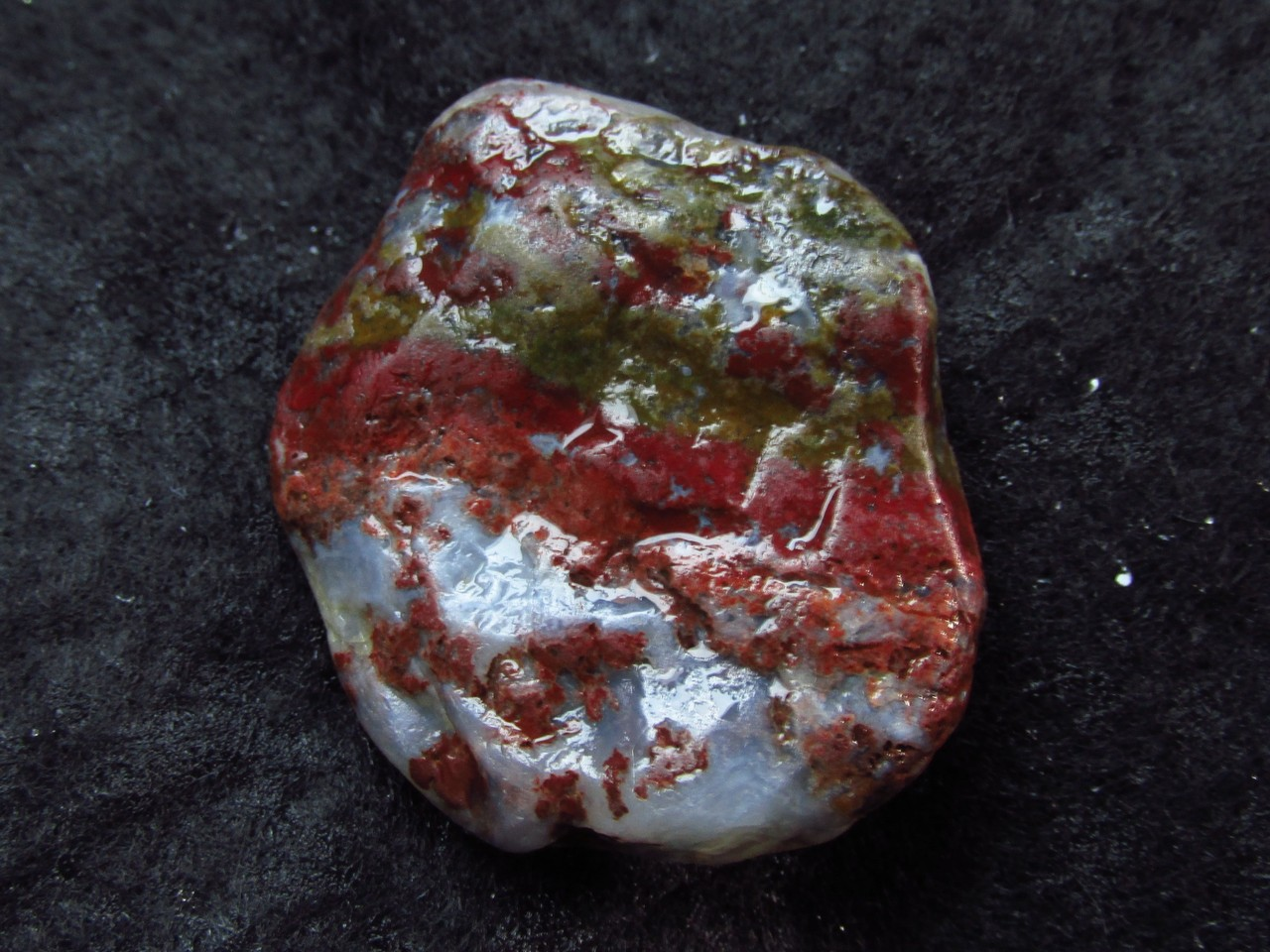
Green-and-red jasper pebble with areas of grey, translucent chalcedony, Aomori Prefecture, Shichiri Nagahama, Japan

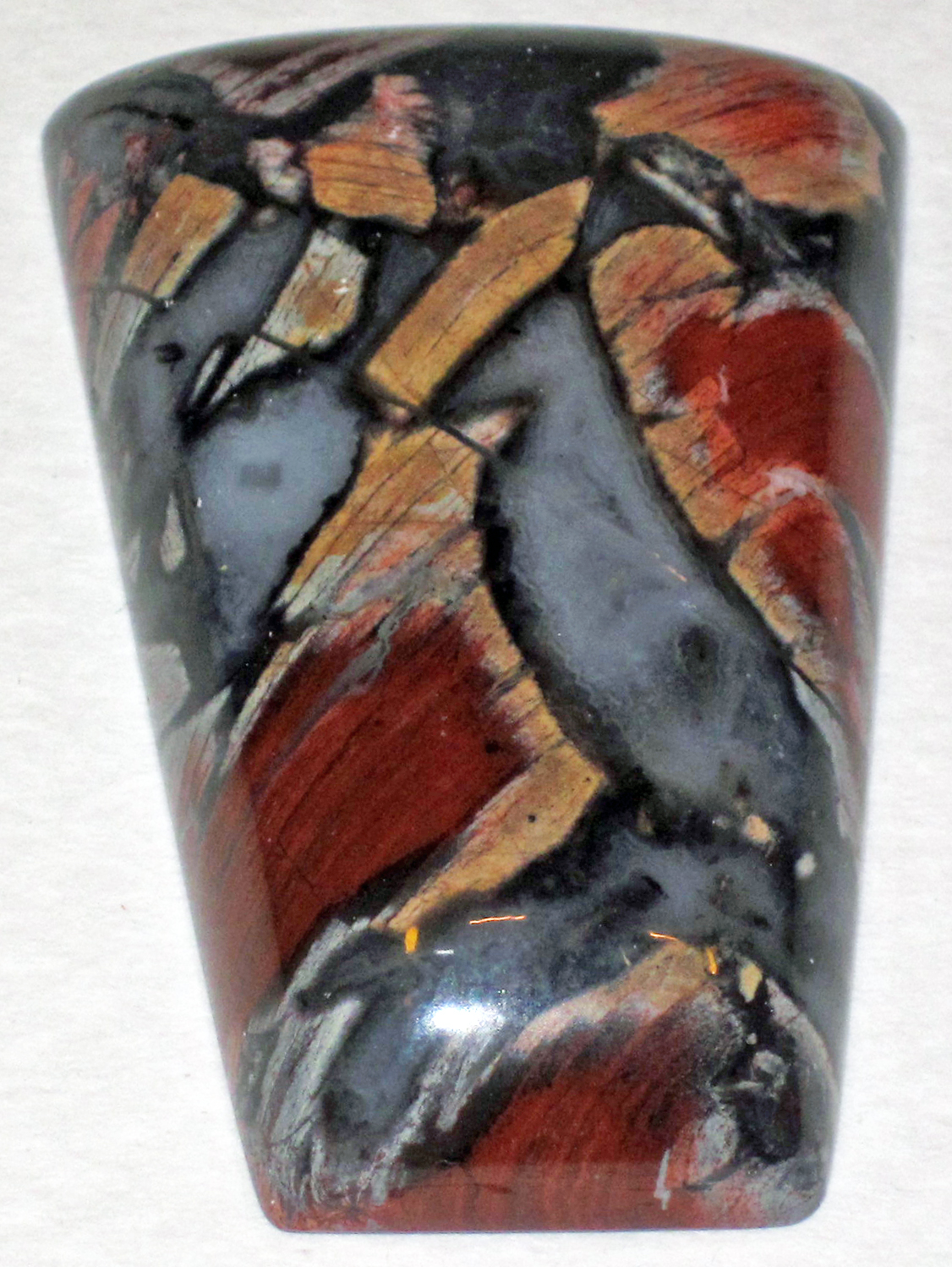
Cabochon of Tabu Tabu jasper (brecciated, with angular clasts cemented by grey chalcedony) South Africa

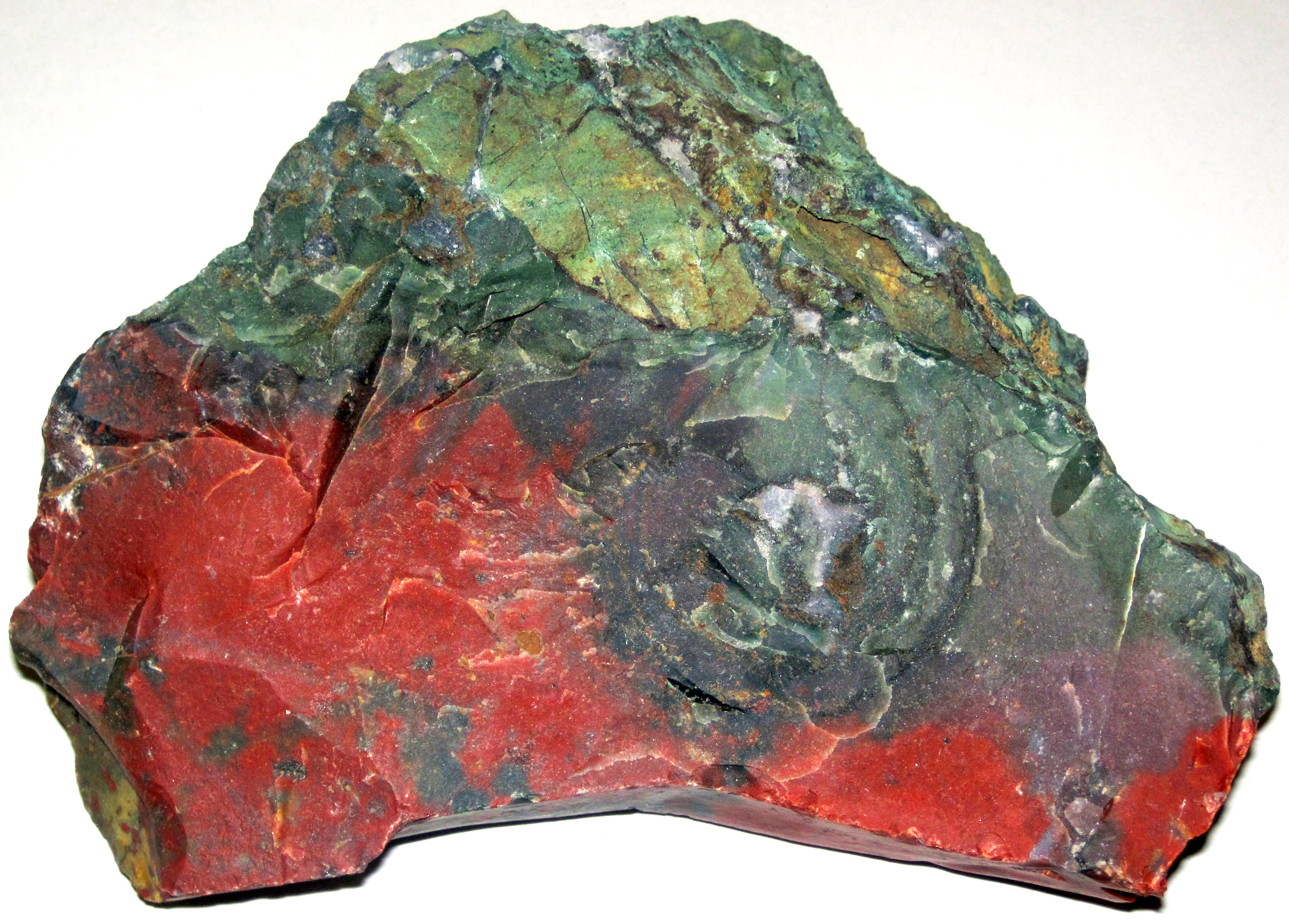
Jasper variety bloodstone, provenance doubtful, possibly Deccan Traps India

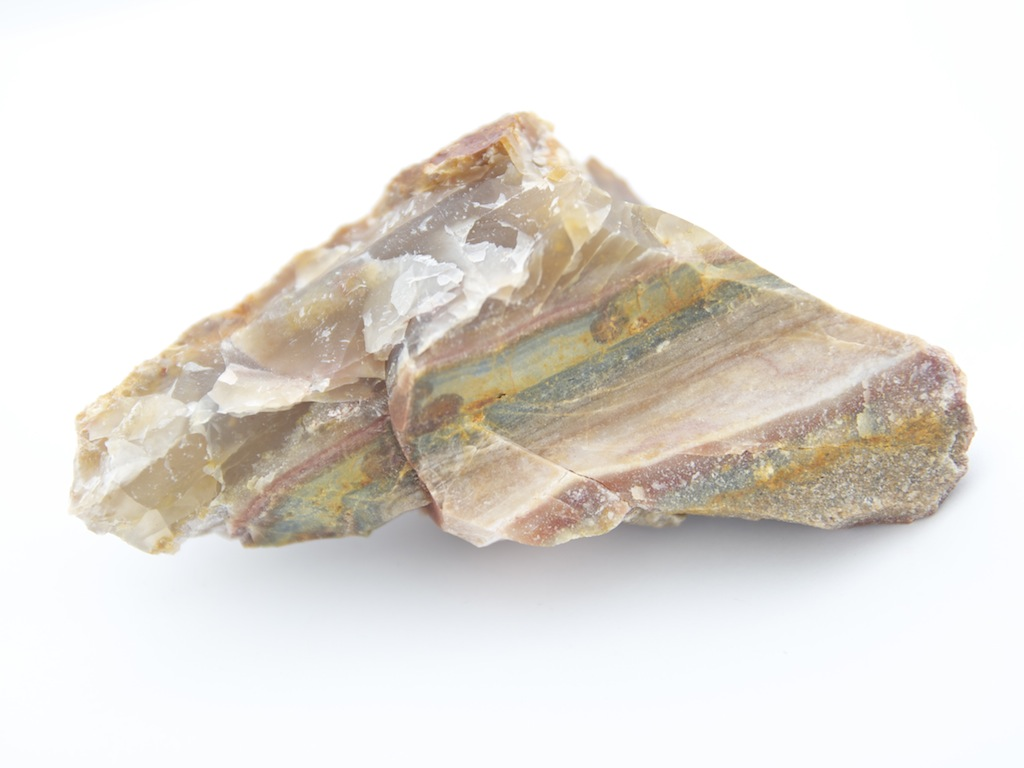
Multi-coloured, banded jasper rough, Montjuïc, Barcelona

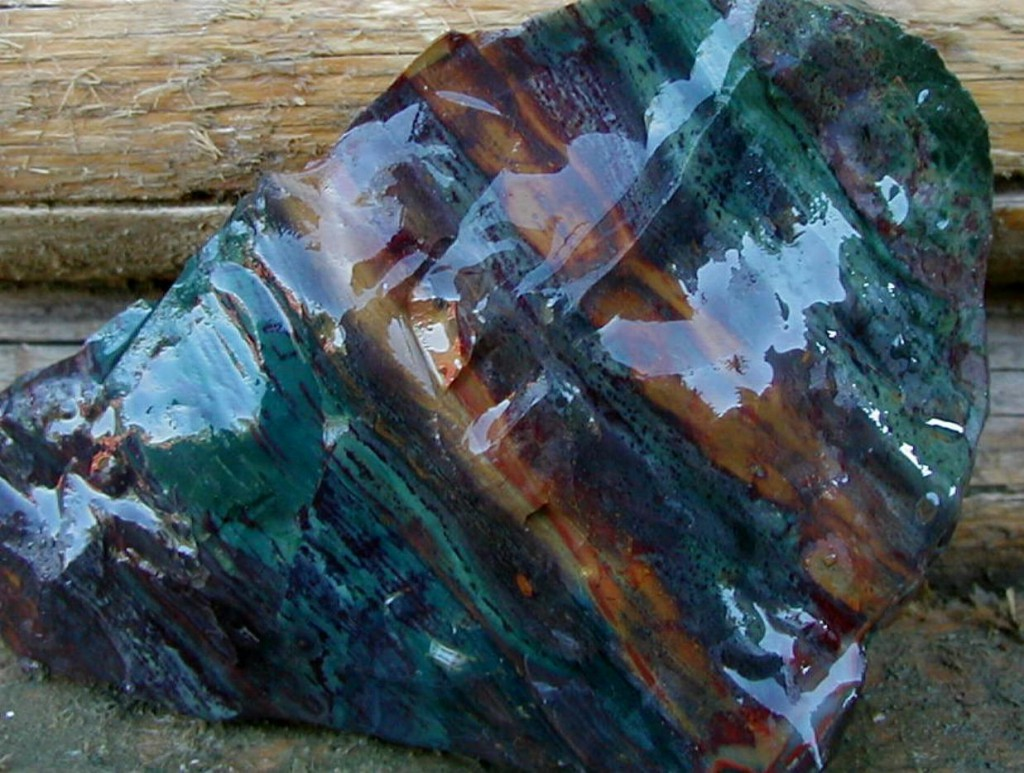
Kaleidoscope jasper rough, Oregon

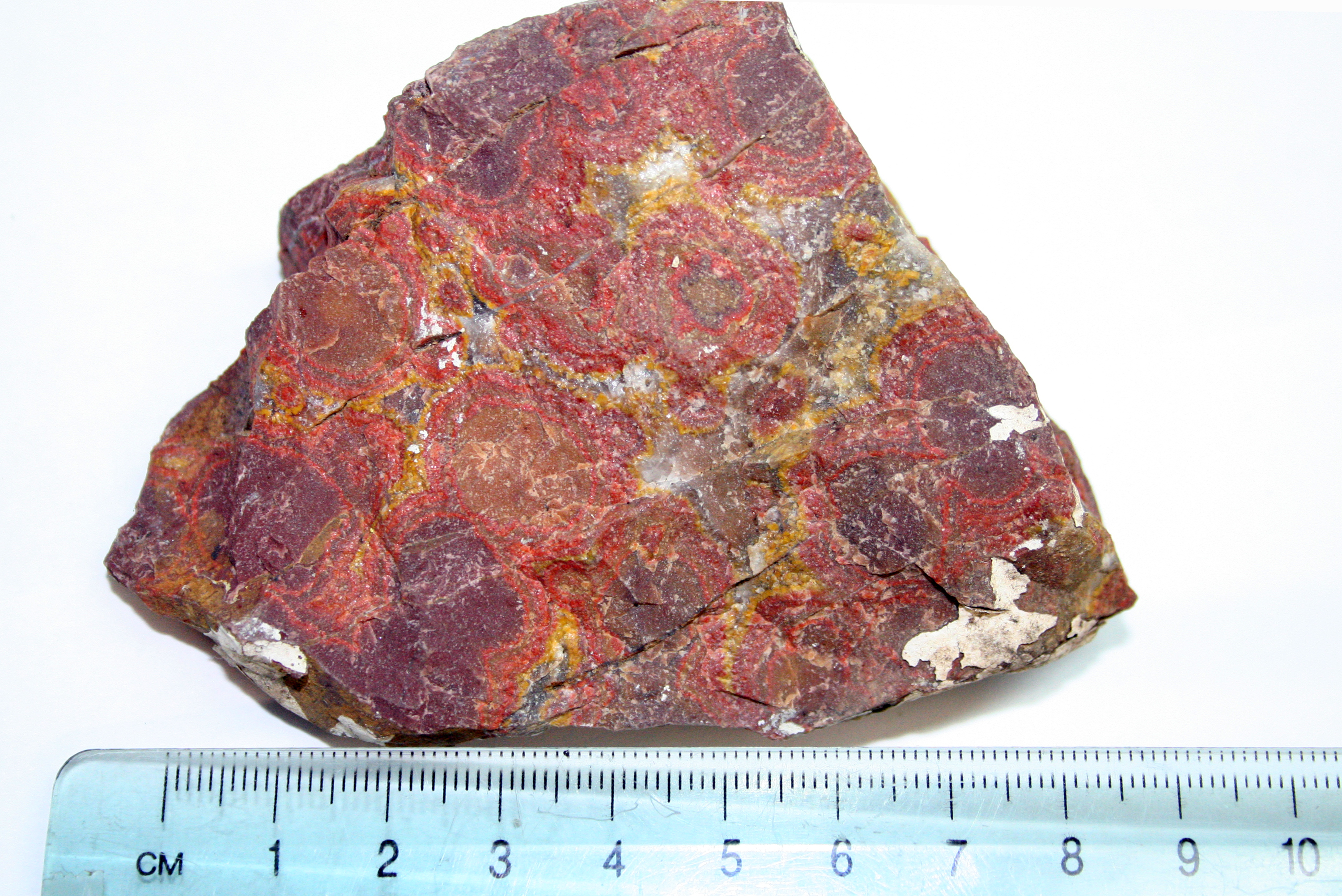
Poppy jasper (an orbicular jasper from Morgan Hill, California), rough

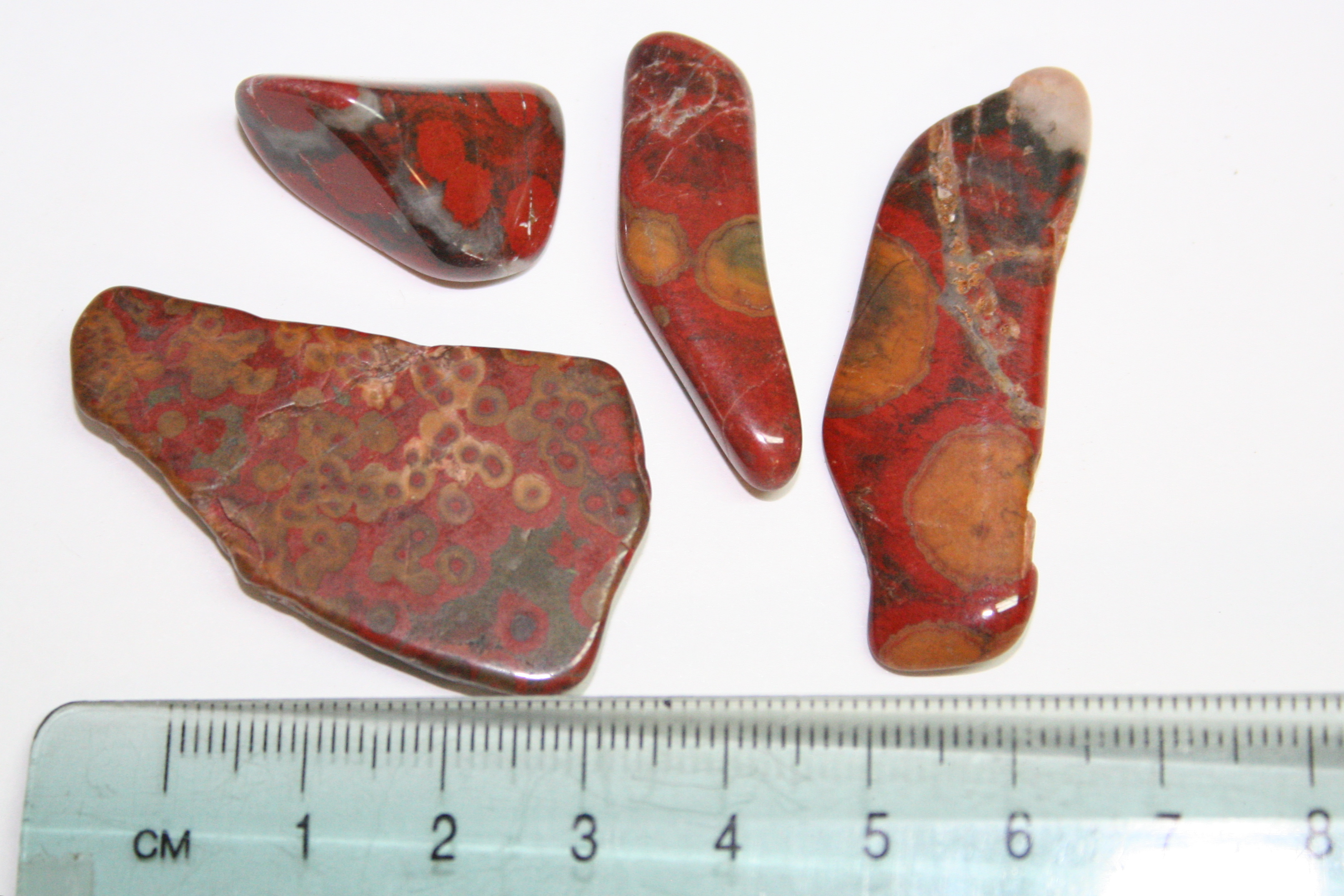
Poppy jasper: small, polished slabs, Morgan Hill, California

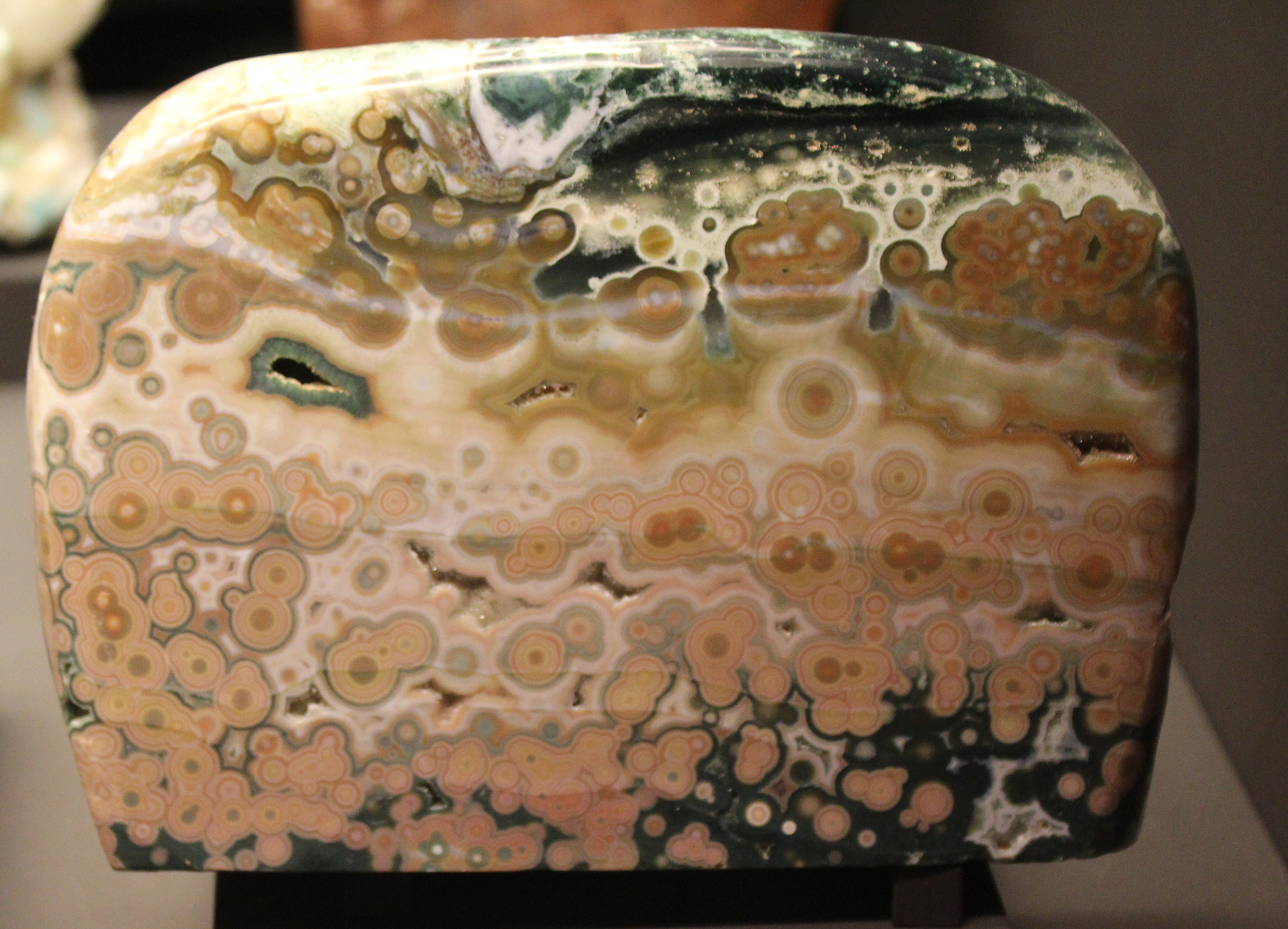
Orbicular "ocean jasper" (not, strictly, a jasper, but a highly silicified rhyolite or tuff) Analalava District Madagascar, polished slab

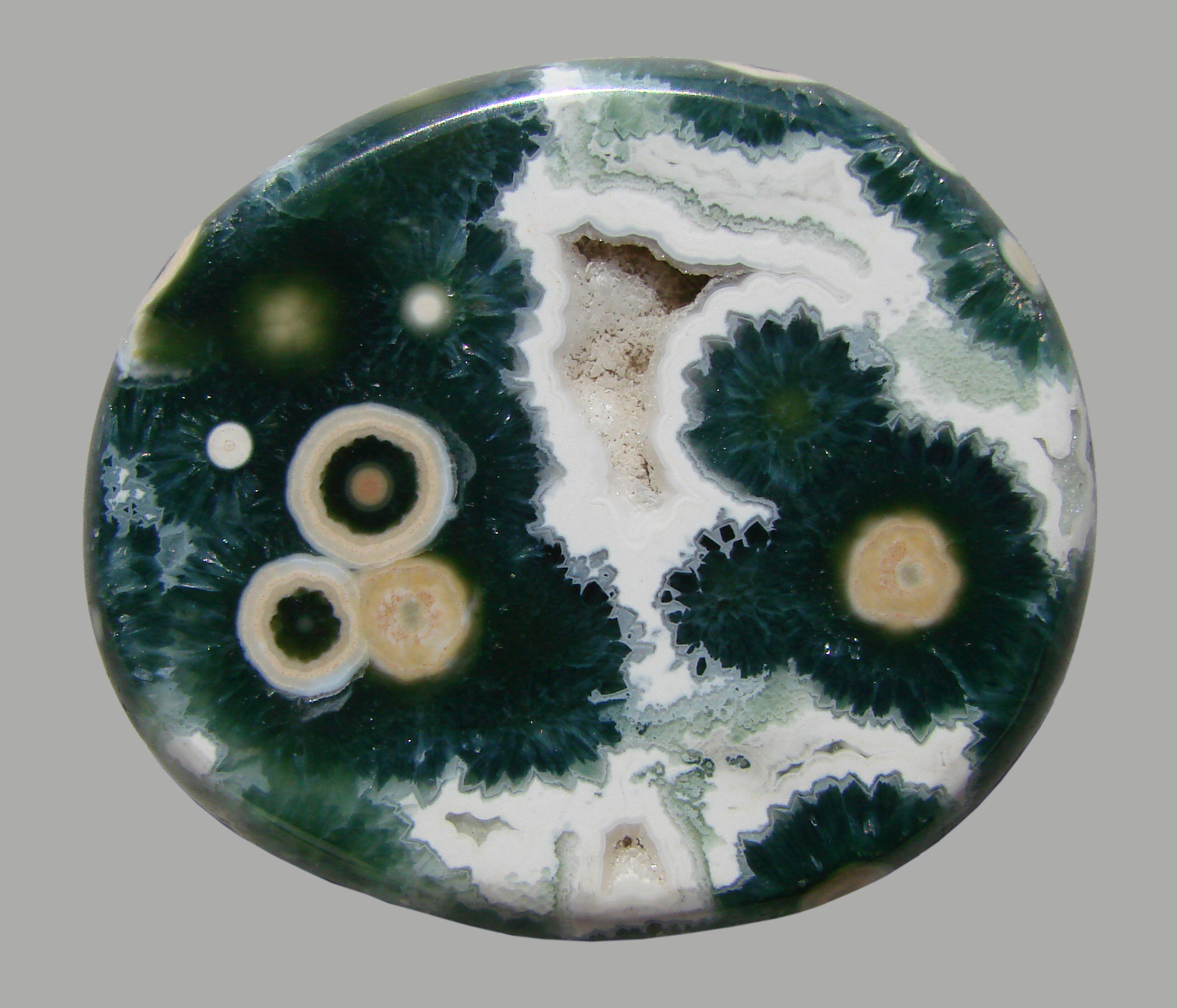
Orbicular "ocean jasper", 5 cm (2.0 in), Analalava District, Madagascar

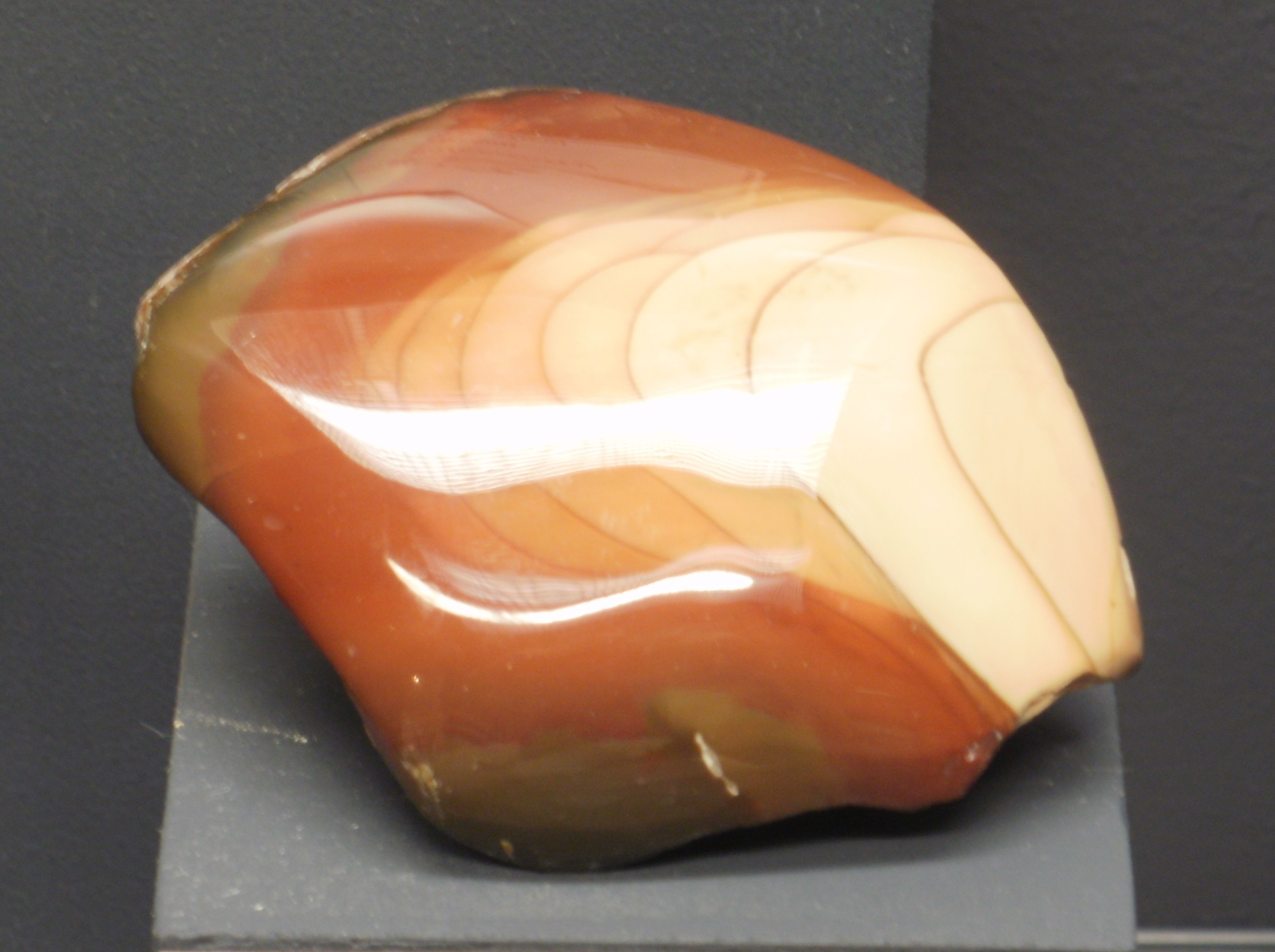
Bruneau jasper, Idaho (this jasper occurs within thundereggs), A. E. Seaman Mineral Museum

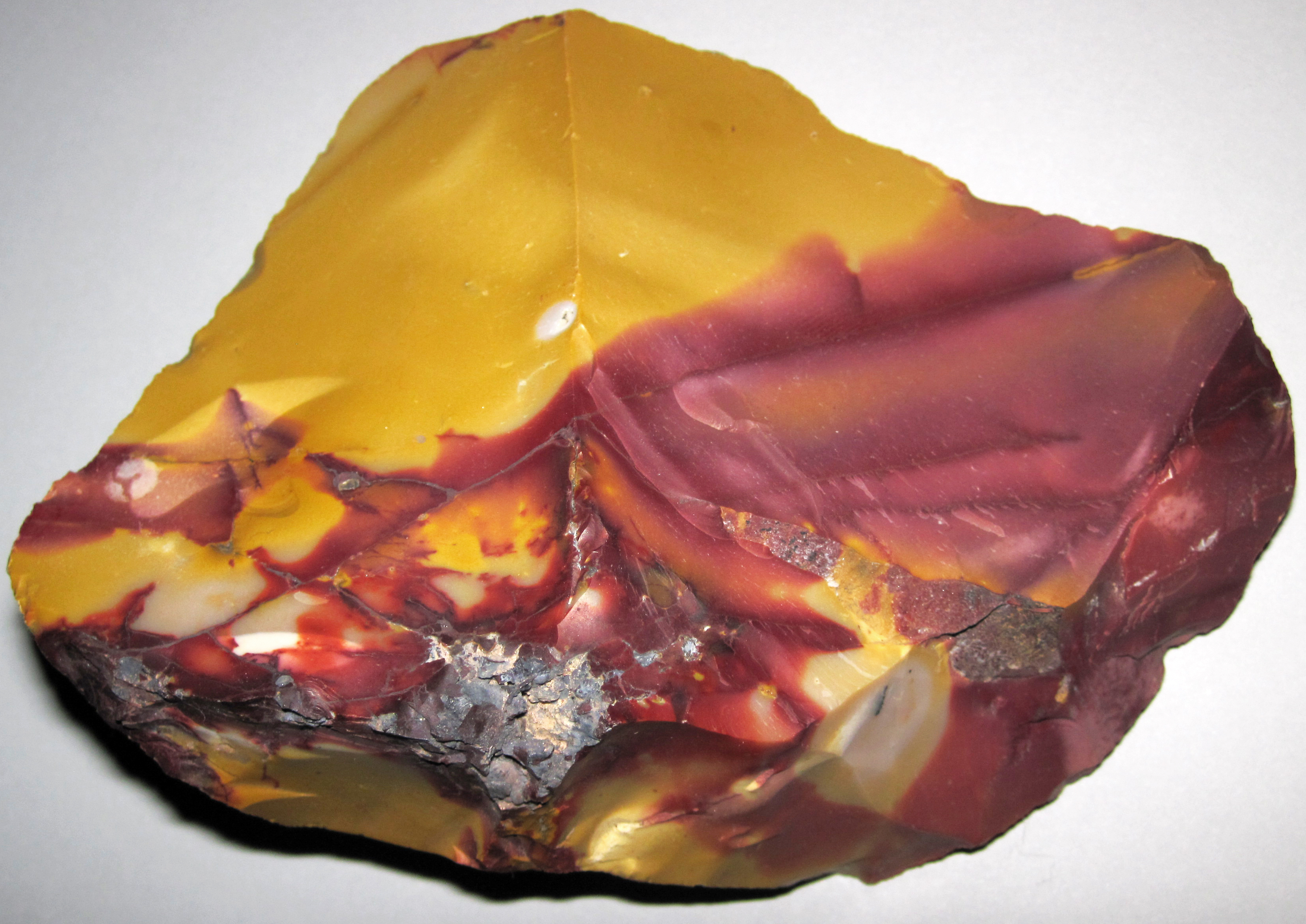
"Mookaite" (a radiolarian chert from the Windalia Radiolarite Formation, Western Australia), rough

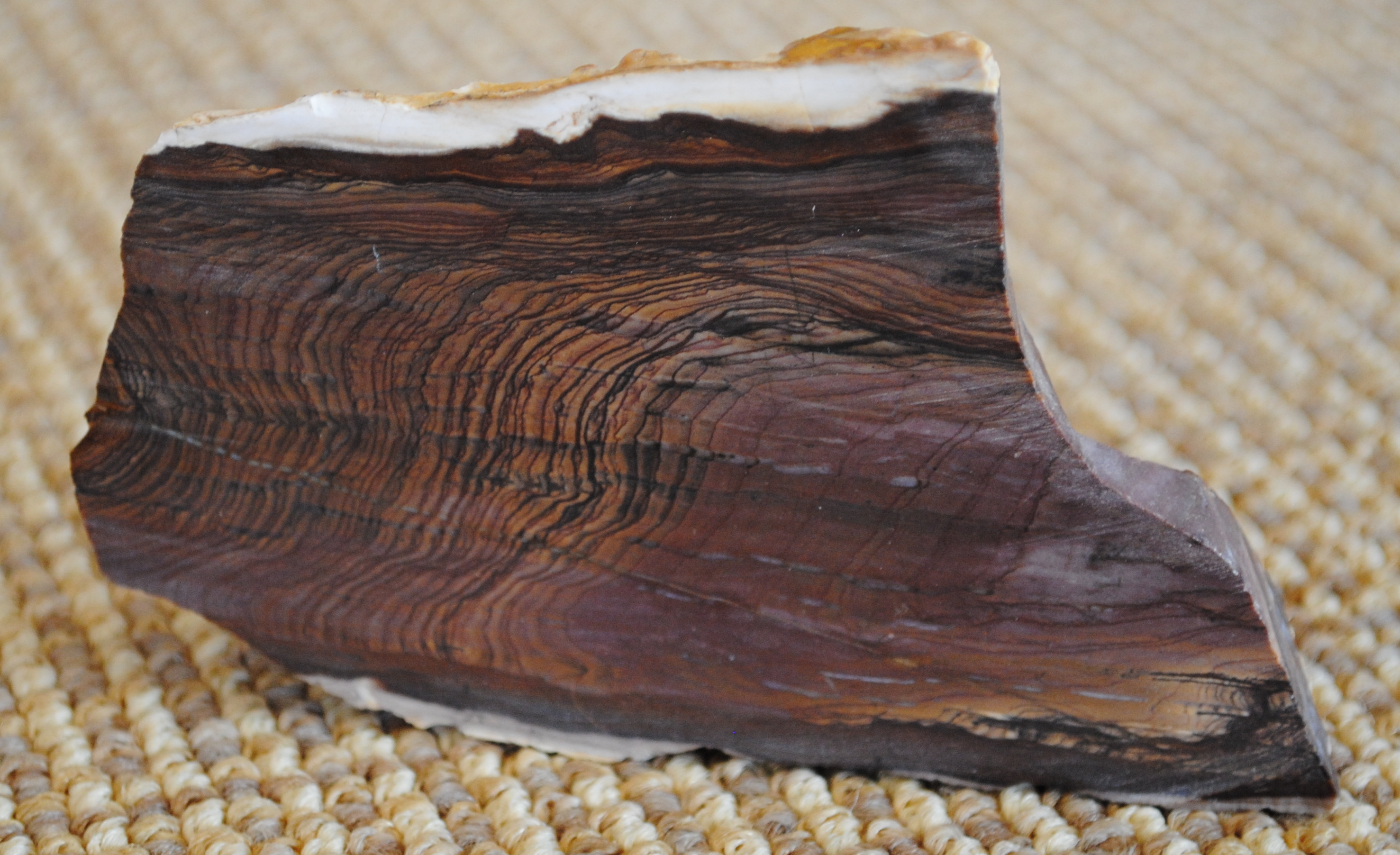
Biggs jasper, Oregon

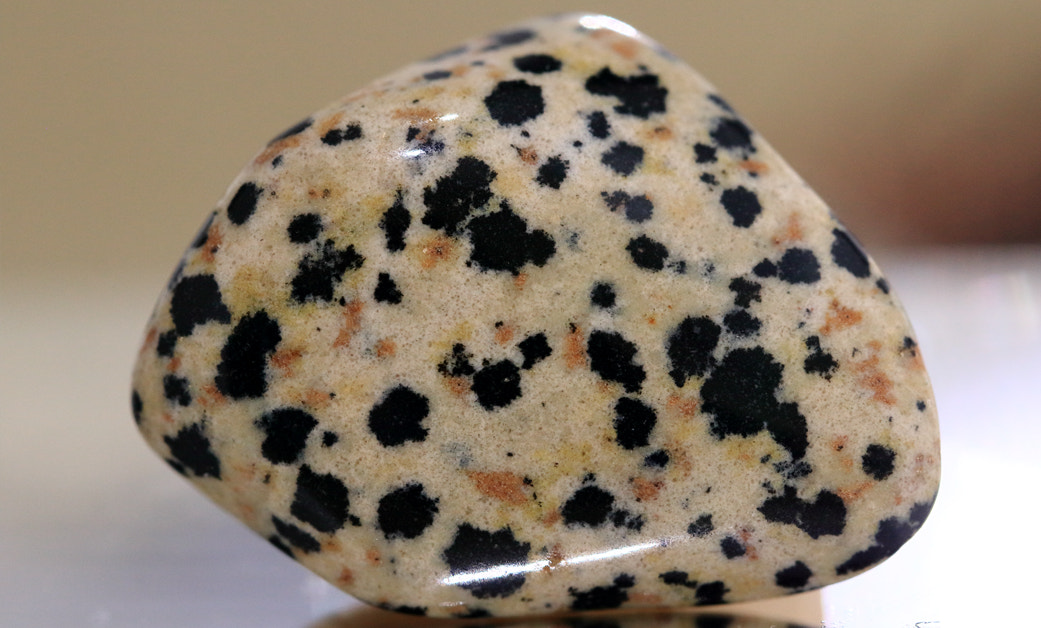
"Dalmatian jasper". According to Mindat, it is a trade name for a peralkaline rock consisting of dark spots embedded on a lighter matrix. Mindat classifies it as a subtype of Peralkaline alkali-feldspar-granite which in turn is a subtype of alkali feldspar granite. Polished pebble.
