= Jacks Creek (Bruneau River tributary) =

- Location of the mouth of Jacks Creek in Idaho Jacks Creek (Bruneau River tributary) (the United States)

Location
- Country: United States
- State: Idaho
- County: Owyhee County, Idaho

Physical characteristics
- Source
  - location: southwest of Bruneau, Owyhee County, Idaho
  - coordinates: 42°47′13″N 115°58′42″W
  - elevation: 2,779 ft (847 m)
- Mouth: Bruneau River
  - location: C. J. Strike Reservoir, Owyhee County, Idaho
  - coordinates: 42°54′02″N 115°52′16″W
  - elevation: 2,457 ft (749 m)
- Length: 15 mi (24 km)

Jacks Creek is a 15-mile (24 km) long tributary of the Bruneau River in Owyhee County, Idaho. Beginning at the confluence of Big Jacks Creek and Little Jacks Creek at an elevation of 2,779 feet (847.0 m) southwest of Bruneau, it flows generally northeast to its mouth at C. J. Strike Reservoir, at an elevation of 2,457 feet (748.9 m). It was named after Jack Turner, a rancher who settled the area in 1869.

== See also ==
- List of rivers of Idaho
