= Bruneau jasper =

Variety of the mineral jasper

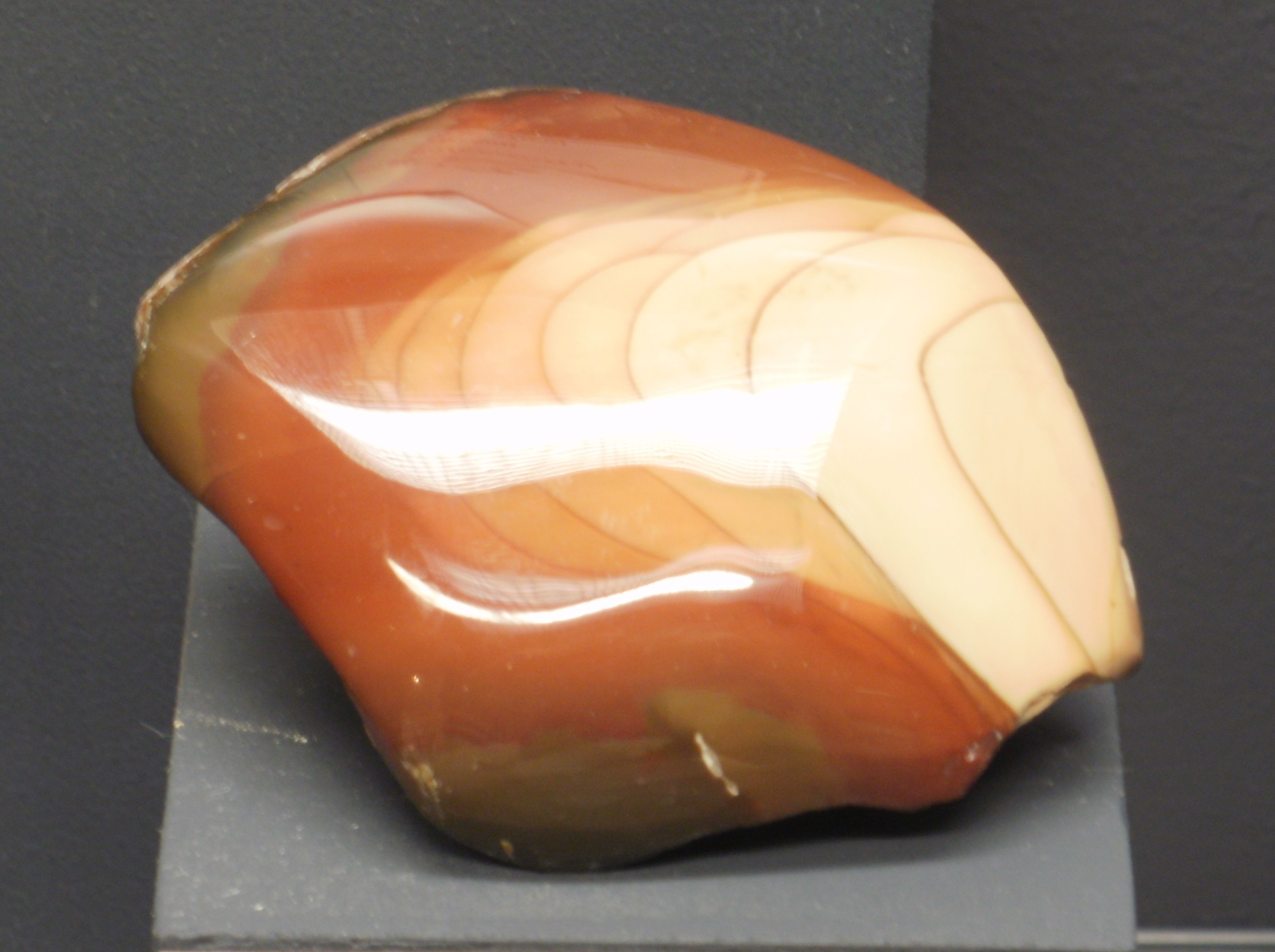
Bruneau jasper

Bruneau jasper is a variety of the mineral jasper. It is a "picture jasper" – a jasper that exhibits particular patterns and colors – and is used as an opaque gemstone.

The stone exhibits layered patterns of brown, reddish brown and cream color, or sometimes of red and green color. It was discovered in the Bruneau River canyon in Idaho, near the bottom of the canyon walls, where the rhyolite in which the jasper occurs is exposed for a length of 8 kilometres (5.0 mi).

As of 2009 Bruneau jasper was no longer in production, and was difficult to locate.
