= Little Jacks Creek, New South Wales =

Little Jacks Creek New South Wales
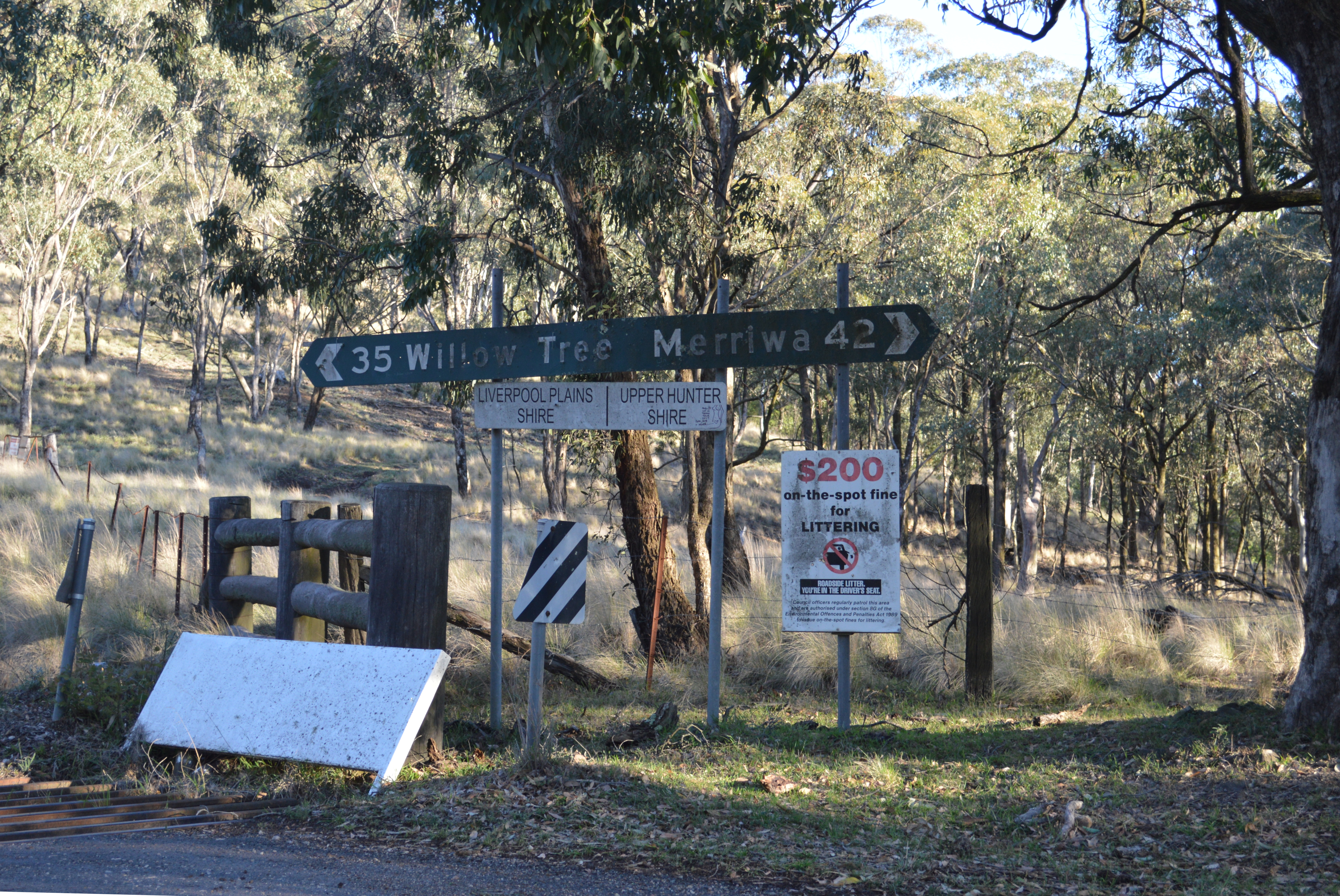
- Crossing the range from Upper Hunter Shire to Liverpool Plains Shire at Little Jacks Creek, 2017

- Coordinates: 31°50′30″S 150°30′52″E
- Population: 24 (SAL 2021)
- Postcode(s): 2339
- Location: 359 km (223 mi) NNW of Sydney; 101 km (63 mi) S of Tamworth; 28 km (17 mi) SW of Willow Tree; 50 km (31 mi) N of Merriwa, New South Wales
- LGA(s): Liverpool Plains Shire
- State electorate(s): Upper Hunter
- Federal division(s): New England

Little Jacks Creek is a locality in the North West Slopes region of New South Wales, Australia. The locality is in the Liverpool Plains Shire local government area, 359 kilometres (223 mi) north west of the state capital, Sydney.

At the 2021 census, Little Jacks Creek had a population of 19.
