= Orbicular jasper =

Variety of the mineral jasper

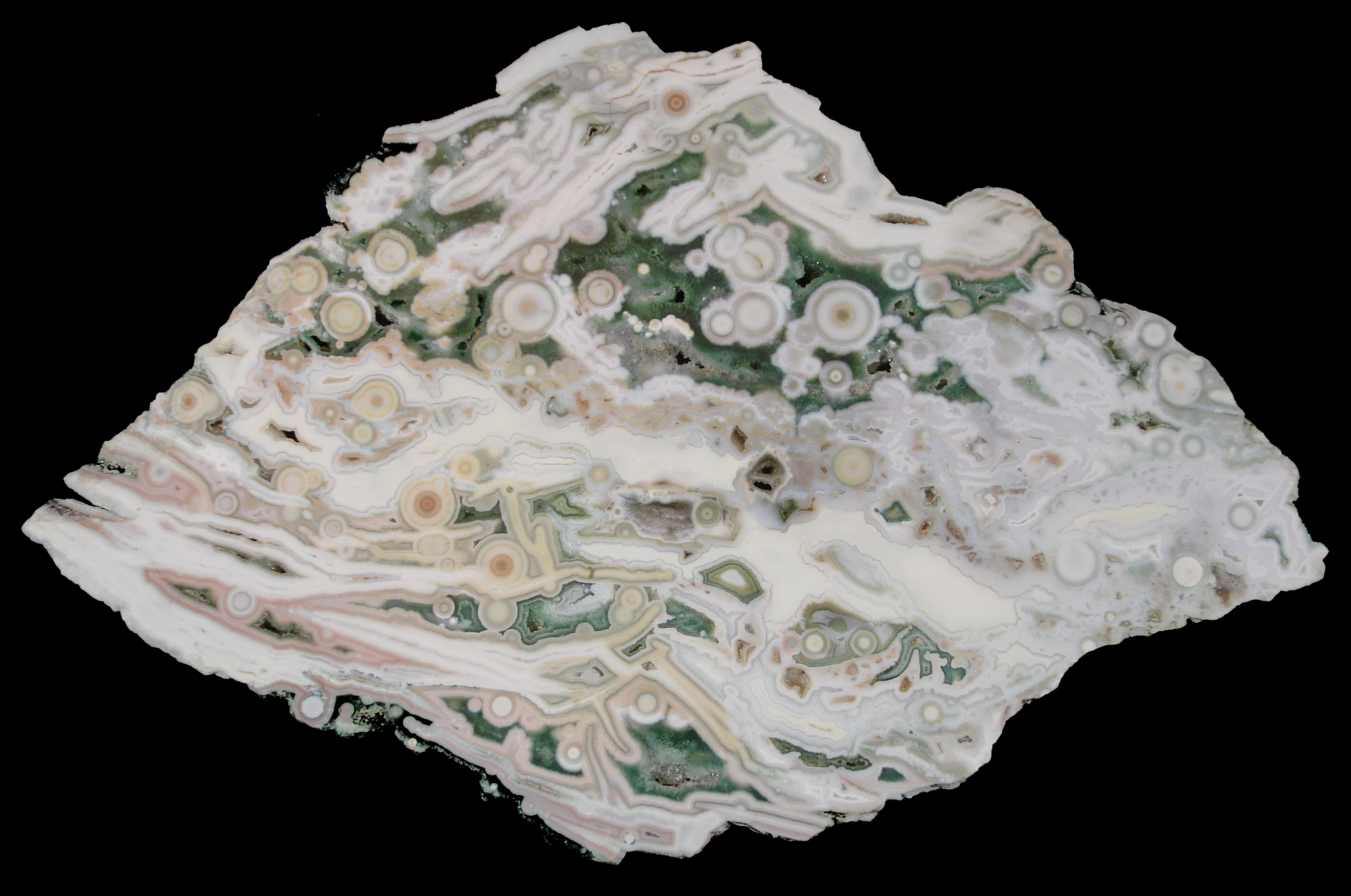
Orbicular jasper from Madagascar

Orbicular jasper is a variety of jasper which contains variably-colored orbs or spherical inclusions or zones. In highly silicified rhyolite or tuff, quartz and feldspar crystallize in radial aggregates of needle-like crystals which provide the basis or seed for the orbicular structure seen in this kind of jasper. The material is quite attractive when polished and is used as an ornamental stone or gemstone.

Various local or commercial names have been used for the material, such as kinradite, oregonite, ocean jasper and poppy-patterned jasper, depending on the source. Poppy-patterned jasper or poppy jasper is the varietal name for material from several locations, but the most well known is from Morgan Hill, Santa Clara County, California. The trade name Ocean Jasper is used for a variety found along the intertidal shores of northeast Madagascar. In Nebraska orbicular jasper is found in altered rhyolite beds noted for a variety of jaspers and related agates.

== Gallery ==
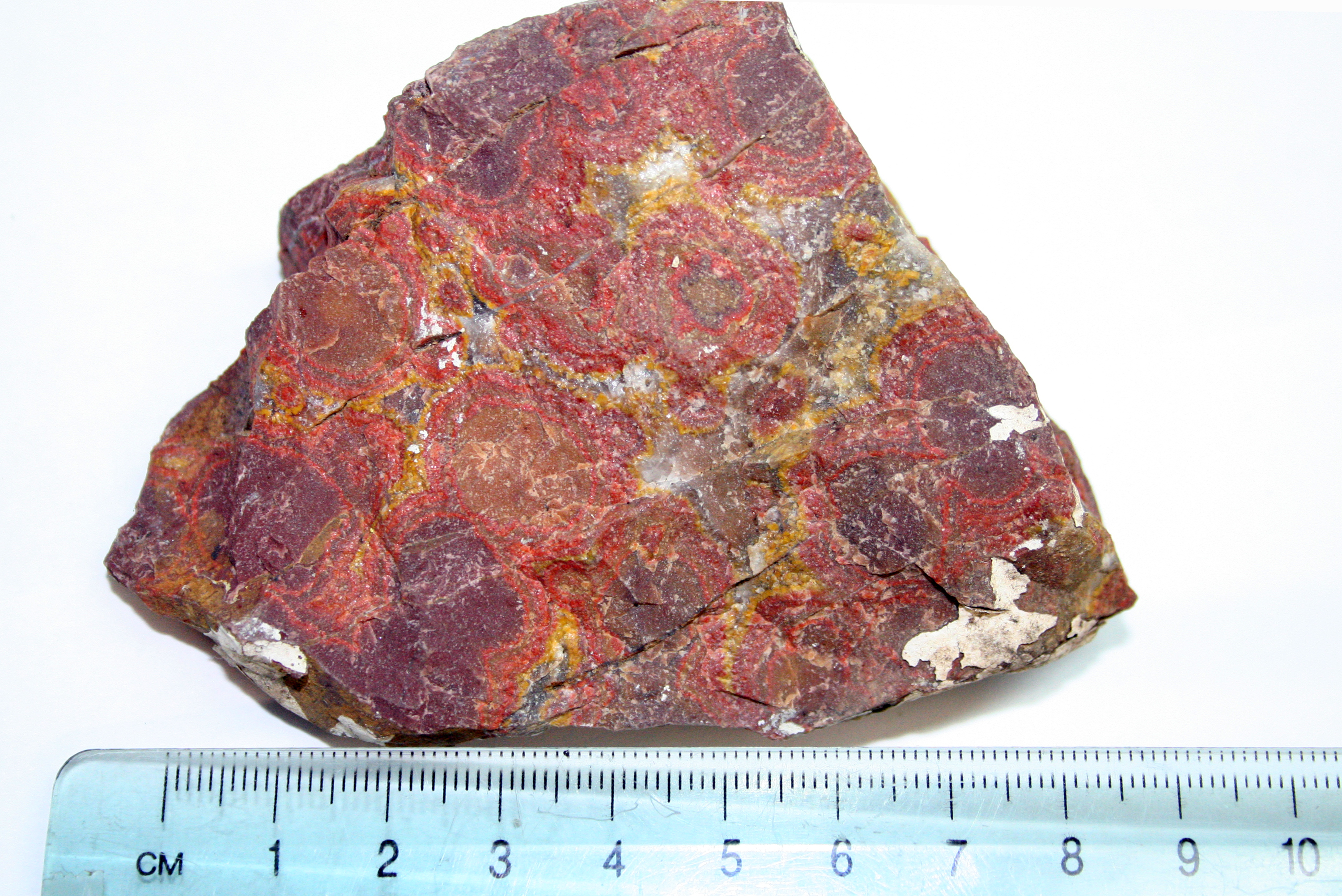
Unpolished poppy jasper, Morgan Hill

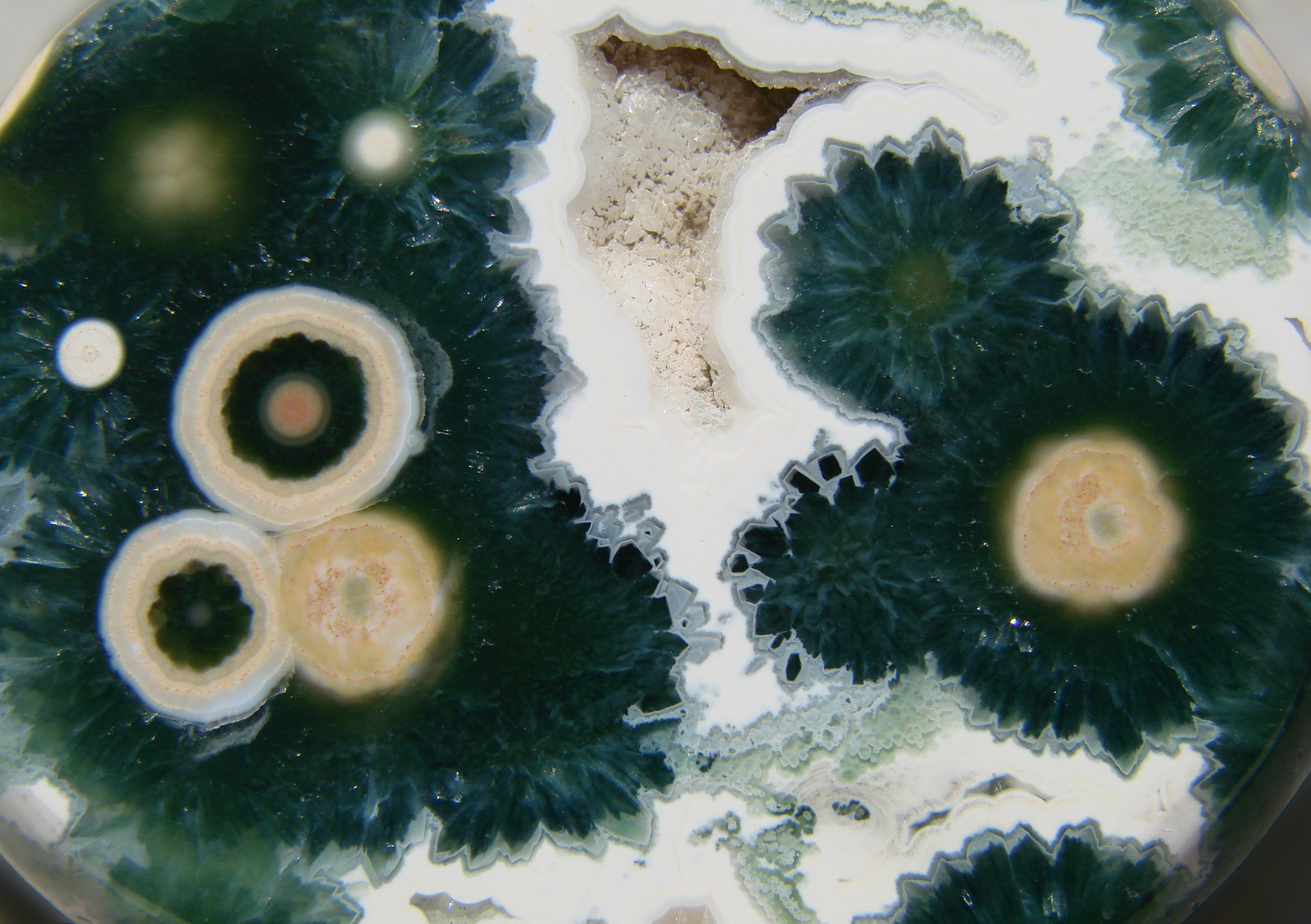
Madagascar orbicular jasper (detail)
