= Bruneau River =

River in Idaho and Nevada, United States

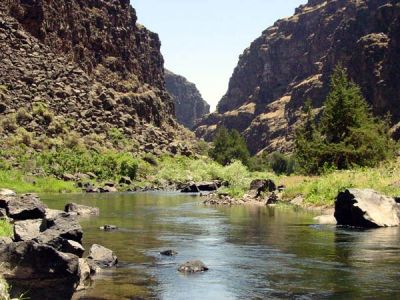
- Bruneau River in southwestern Idaho

- Location in the United States Location of mouth in Idaho

Location
- Country: United States
- State: Idaho, Nevada
- Counties: Owyhee County, Idaho; Elko County, Nevada

Physical characteristics
- Source
  - location: Jarbidge Mountains, Elko County, Nevada
  - coordinates: 41°34′42″N 115°24′50″W
  - elevation: 8,061 feet (2,457 m)
- Mouth: Snake River
  - location: C. J. Strike Reservoir, Owyhee County, Idaho
  - coordinates: 42°56′57″N 115°57′43″W
  - elevation: 2,457 feet (749 m)
- Length: 153 miles (246 km)
- Basin size: 3,305 sq mi (8,560 km^{2})
- Discharge
  - location: Hot Springs gage 131685000
  - average: 388 cu ft/s (11.0 m^{3}/s)

Basin features
- Tributaries
  - left: Clover Creek
  - right: Jarbidge River

National Wild and Scenic River
- Type: Wild, Recreational
- Designated: March 30, 2009

The Bruneau River is a 153-mile-long (246 km) tributary of the Snake River in the western United States, located in Idaho and Nevada. It runs through a narrow canyon cut into ancient lava flows in southwestern Idaho. The Bruneau Canyon, which is up to 1,200 feet (370 m) deep and forty miles (65 km) long, features rapids and hot springs, making it a popular whitewater trip.

The Bruneau River's drainage basin is bounded by the Jarbidge Mountains to the southeast, the Owyhee Mountains and Chalk Hills to the west, and the Bruneau Plateau to the east.

== Course ==
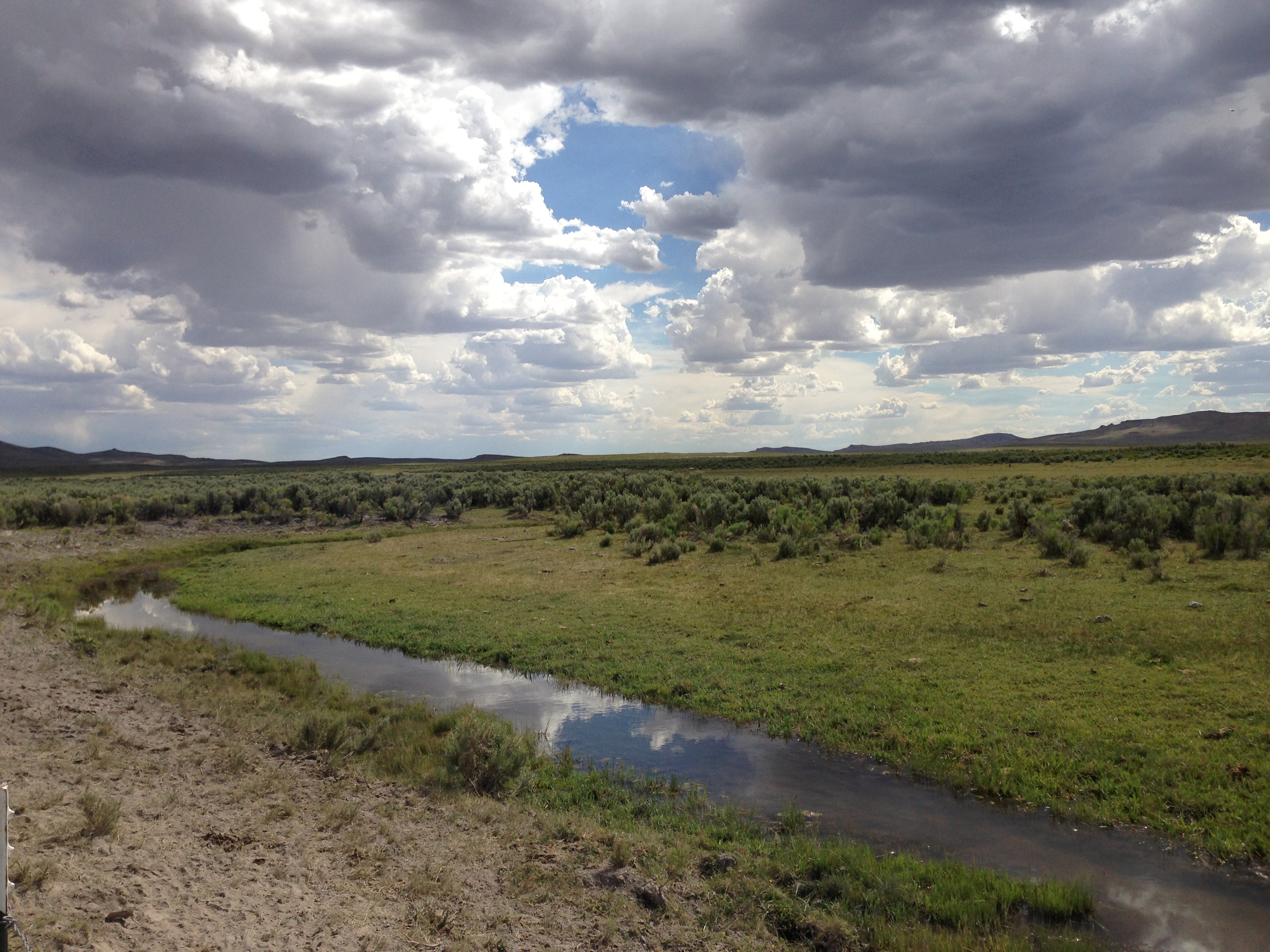
The Bruneau River at Charleston-Deeth Road in Elko County, Nevada, near its source

The Bruneau River system originates within and near the Jarbidge and Mountain City Ranger Districts of the Humboldt–Toiyabe National Forest in northern Elko County. The three main streams are the East Fork Bruneau River, the West Fork Bruneau River, and the Jarbidge River, all of which flow generally north. The Jarbidge River joins the West Fork, then the East and West Forks join to form the mainstem Bruneau River. Sheep Creek and Jacks Creek join from the west, and Clover Creek joins from the east. Most of the watershed is characterized by high plateaus through which the Bruneau and its tributaries cut deep, sheer canyons, especially along the middle Bruneau River and the lower reaches of the Jarbidge River, Sheep Creek, and the East Fork Bruneau.

The Bruneau River emerges from the plateau and canyon region 16 miles (26 km) upstream from its mouth at the Snake River's C. J. Strike Reservoir. At this point, the river enters the broad and fertile Snake River Plain. This lower section of the watershed is occupied by farms and ranches, and the town of Bruneau.

== River modifications ==
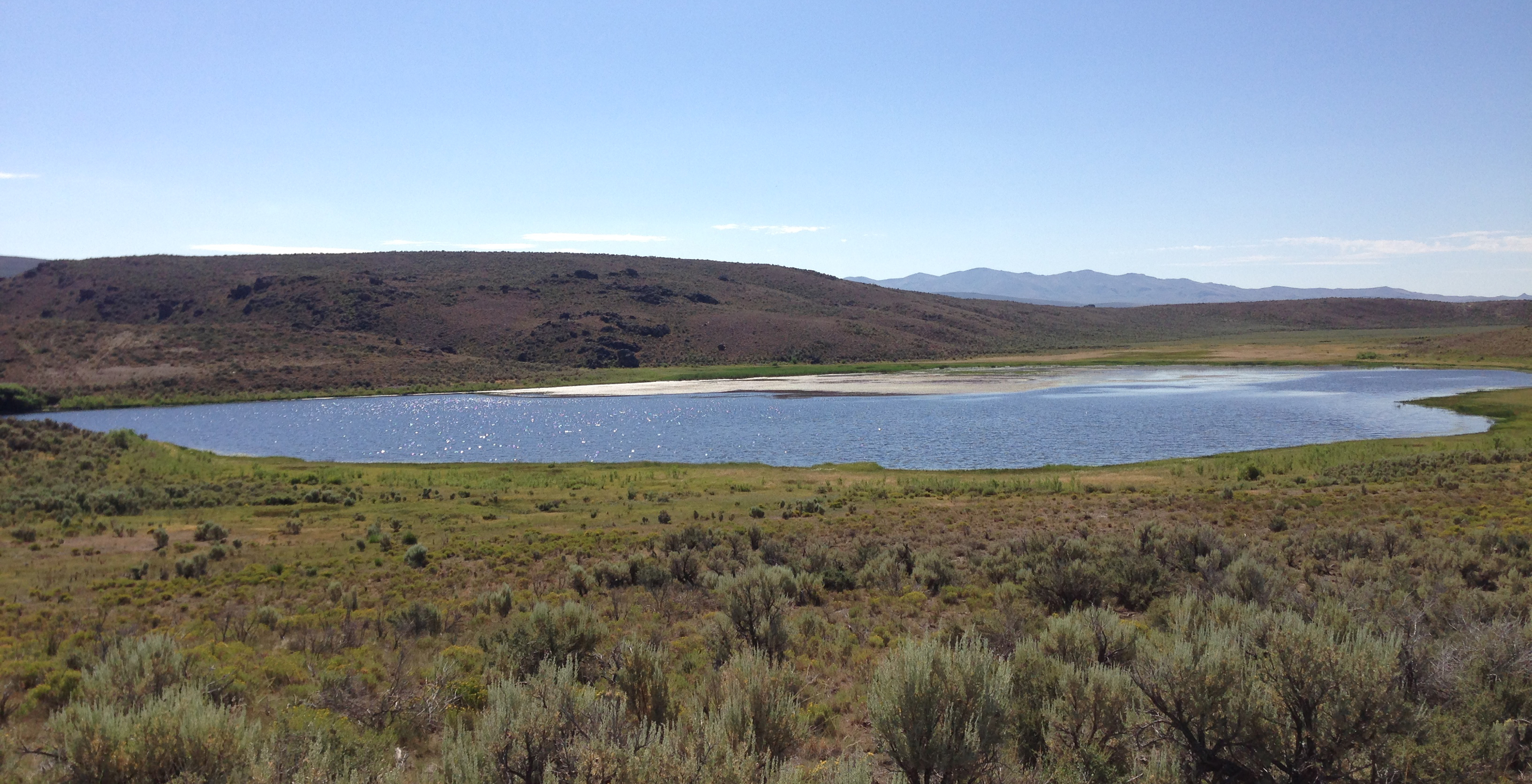
Charleston Reservoir near Charleston, Nevada

The Bruneau River is used for irrigation purposes near the Snake River. Irrigation withdrawals result in a number of its tributary streams being largely dewatered annually.

== History ==
The Bruneau River region was historically occupied by the Northern Shoshone, Northern Paiute, and Bannock tribes

The Bruneau River was given its name sometime before 1821 by French Canadian Pierre Bruneau (1796–1873) voyageurs working for the Montreal-based fur trading North West Company. The name is derived from the French meaning "dark water".

Bruneau jasper, a semi-precious gemstone, was discovered near the bottom of the Bruneau River canyon walls and named after the river.

== Recreation and protected areas ==
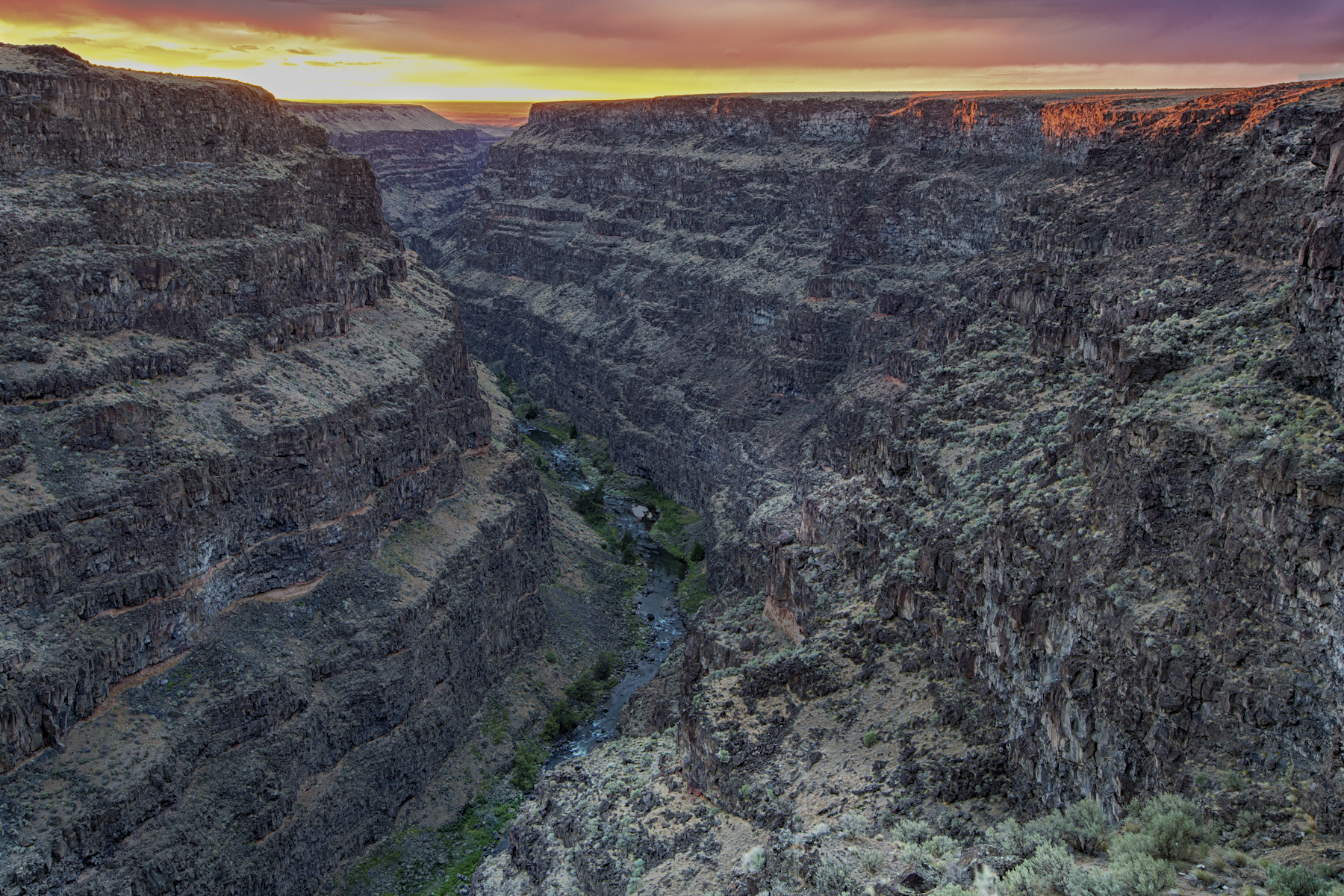
Bruneau Canyon from overlook

Much of the mainstem Bruneau River above Hot Spring is designated as a Wild and Scenic River, as are parts of the West Fork and East Fork and some of Sheep Creek. The Jarbidge Wilderness covers a portion of the southern end of the Bruneau watershed. The Bruneau River is protected in the new Bruneau - Jarbidge Rivers Wilderness, which was created by the Omnibus Public Land Management Act of 2009 and signed into law on March 30, 2009. The new wilderness area includes the Bruneau from about five miles upstream of the Jarbidge River confluence down nearly to the confluence with Hot Creek, as well as portions of Sheep Creek and Clover Creek.

Whitewater rafting and kayaking opportunities exist on the Bruneau and Jarbidge Rivers. The Jarbridge canyon contains stretches of whitewater with class 5 and class 6 rapids from both recent and distant canyon wall collapses. From the bridge below the confluence of West Fork at Indian hot spring to the take out, it is class 3 dominant with just a couple rapids that reach class 4 at flows between 1600 and 3000 cfs.

== See also ==
- Bruneau Dunes State Park
- Salmon Falls Creek
- List of longest streams of Idaho
- List of National Wild and Scenic Rivers

== External links and references ==
- "NASA Earth Observatory page". Archived from the original on July 16, 2001.
