= C. J. Strike Reservoir =

C.J. Strike Reservoir

- Location within Idaho Location within the United States
- Location: Owyhee / Elmore counties, Idaho, United States
- Coordinates: 42°57′N 115°58′W
- Type: reservoir
- Primary inflows: Snake River, Bruneau River
- Primary outflows: Snake River
- Catchment area: 40,800 sq mi (105,672 km^{2})
- Basin countries: United States
- Surface area: 7,500 acres (30 km^{2})
- Surface elevation: 2,457 ft (749 m)

C.J. Strike Reservoir is a reservoir located in southwestern Idaho. Its main recreational features include the C. J. Strike Dam and its 7,500-acre (30 km^{2}) reservoir, an impoundment of the Snake River and Bruneau River. This in turn provides excellent fishing (both cold and warm water) and boating opportunities along with, to a lesser extent camping and hiking.

The area is maintained and managed largely by Idaho Power Company, which provides free public access and operates the campgrounds adjacent to the reservoir. The area is also known for ruts from the Oregon Trail which can still be seen by hiking the area.

== Species of Fish ==
The following are or have been resident fishes of Strike Reservoir: Black Crappie, Bluegill, Bridgelip Sucker, Brown Bullhead, Channel Catfish, Chiselmouth, Common Carp, Largemouth Bass, Largescale Sucker, Mottled Sculpin, Mountain Whitefish, Northern Pikeminnow, Peamouth, Pumpkinseed, Rainbow Trout, Redside Shiner, Smallmouth Bass, Warmouth, White Crappie, White Sturgeon (Snake River Population), Whitefish (Var. Sp. Prosopium), and Yellow Perch.

Idaho Fish and Game Commission recommends the following for sportsman: Bluegill, Pumpkinseed, Sunfish, Bullhead Catfish, Channel Catfish, Crappie, Largemouth Bass, Rainbow Trout, Smallmouth Bass, White Sturgeon, and Yellow Perch.

Due to ignorance of certain individuals other known species have also been found and transplanted. Like all natural resources, continued abuse of the reservoir's ecosystem could have a detrimental effect on future fishing.
