= Willow Creek (Malheur River tributary) =

- Location of the mouth of Willow Creek in Oregon

Location
- Country: United States
- State: Oregon
- County: Malheur

Physical characteristics
- Source
  - location: near Ironside
  - coordinates: 44°20′08″N 117°56′15″W
  - elevation: 3,724 ft (1,135 m)
- Mouth: Malheur River
  - location: near Vale
  - coordinates: 43°59′14″N 117°13′51″W
  - elevation: 2,234 ft (681 m)
- Length: 57 mi (92 km)
- Basin size: 787 sq mi (2,040 km^{2})

Willow Creek is a 57-mile (92 km) tributary of the Malheur River in Malheur County in the U.S. state of Oregon. The creek, which forms at 3,724 feet (1,135 m) above sea level and ends at 2,234 feet (681 m), flows generally southeast between Ironside and Vale. Willow Creek's watershed covers 787 square miles (2,040 km^{2}) of relatively arid land.

Willow Creek begins at the confluence of its Middle and South forks, slightly north of Ironside and U.S. Route 26. It flows northeast away from Route 26 to Malheur Reservoir, then turns southeast by Huntington Junction before reaching Route 26 again at Brogan. The creek continues southeast, roughly parallel to the highway, through Jamieson and Willowcreek before reaching Vale. It enters the Malheur River about 19 miles (31 km) from the larger stream's confluence with the Snake River.

Irrigated farming in the basin produces sugar beets, onions, potatoes, corn, mint, grain, alfalfa seed, vegetable seed, and hay. Between Brogan and Vale, the creek has been turned into a drainage and irrigation canal for farms. Above Brogan, as far as the Malheur Reservoir, 41 miles (66 km) from the mouth, the historic stream was dredged and placer-mined for gold and silver. Water flow for much of the creek is controlled by releases from the reservoir. The upper creek is also used for irrigation.

Fishing on the main stem above Malheur Reservoir and along Middle and South Willow creeks is good for native Great Basin redband trout and "hatchery trout escapees from the reservoir". The creeks also have a population of rainbow trout; catches averaging 9 to 10 inches (23 to 25 cm) are the norm. The Willow and its forks are not heavily fished.

== See also ==
- List of longest streams of Oregon
- List of rivers of Oregon
