= Malheur Reservoir =

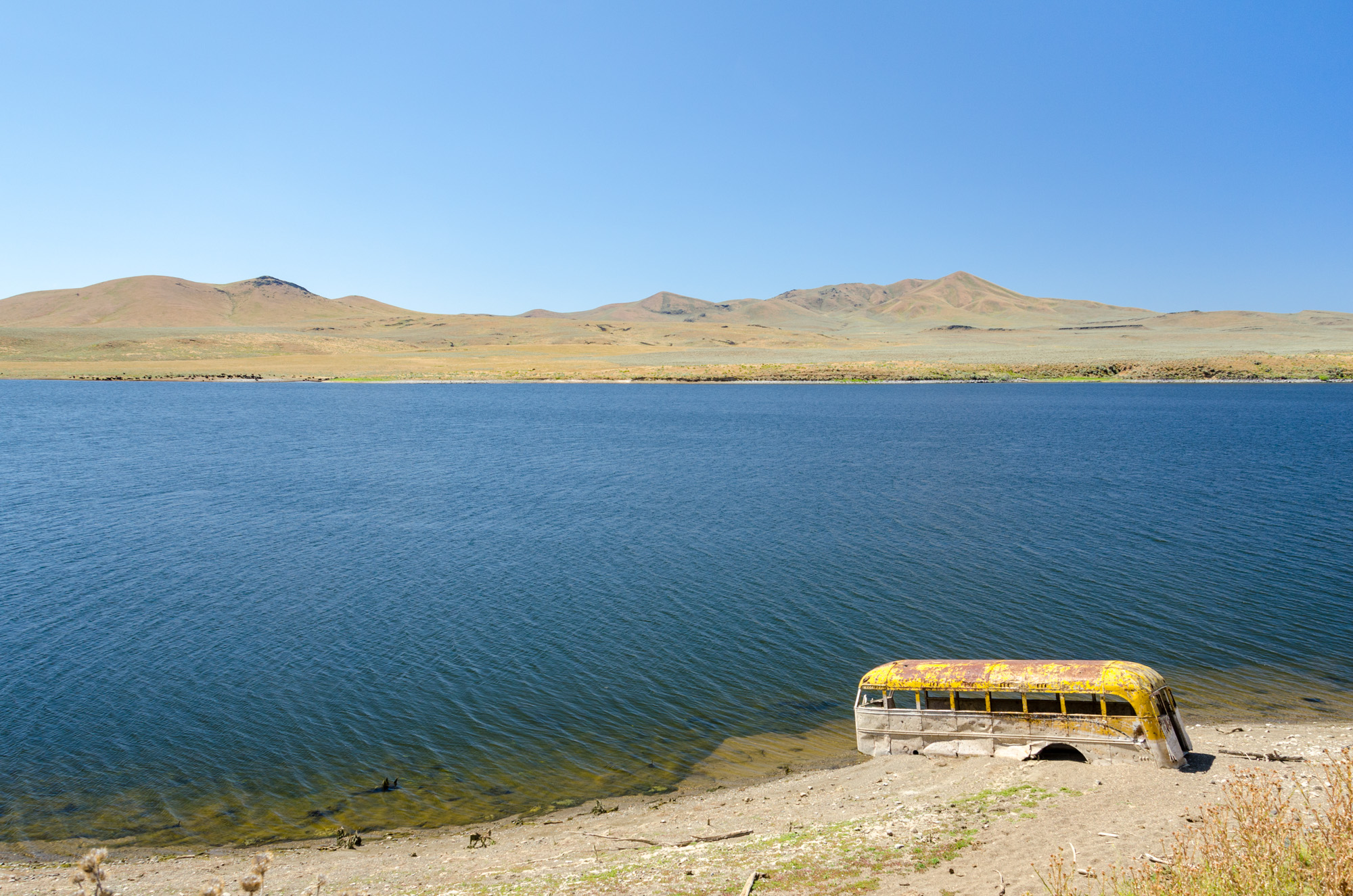

- Location within Oregon Location within the United States
- Location: Malheur, Oregon, United States
- Coordinates: 44.3649749°N 117.6984041°W
- Type: Lake
- River sources: Willow Creek
- Surface area: 1,282 acres (519 ha)
- Average depth: 38 ft (12 m)
- Surface elevation: 3,365 ft (1,026 m)

Malheur Reservoir is an irrigation lake along Willow Creek in Malheur County in the U.S. state of Oregon. Built by the Orchard Irrigation District in the 1930s, the 1,282-acre (5.19 km^{2}) lake can hold about 49,000 acre-feet (60,000,000 m^{3}) of water, which is used to irrigate about 2,300 acres (930 ha) of farmland downstream. Draining a semi-arid rangeland basin of 254 square miles (660 km^{2}), the reservoir receives very high concentrations of nutrients and is naturally eutrophic.

About 80 percent of the 12.3-mile (19.8 km) shoreline is privately owned, but the lake and part of the shore is open to public use. Since the mid-1960s, the reservoir has been stocked with rainbow trout, although fishing conditions have varied with weather cycles, and the reservoir has at times gone dry during drought. During wet cycles, it is capable of producing trout in excess of 20 inches (51 cm) long.

The lake is accessible by dirt road, starting either from an intersection with U.S. Route 26, about 15 miles (24 km) to the southwest, near Ironside, or from a different intersection with Route 26, about 15 miles (24 km) to the southeast near Brogan. The lake has a boat ramp on the north shore, and camping is possible in a few places near the ramp. The Malheur County Parks Department maintains the boat ramp as well as gravel parking and a restroom.

== See also ==
- List of lakes in Oregon
