= Willowcreek, Oregon =

Unincorporated community in the state of Oregon, United States

Willowcreek is an unincorporated community in Malheur County, Oregon, United States. It is approximately 11 miles (18 km) northwest of Vale along U.S. Route 26. Willowcreek is located at 44°06′53″N 117°21′52″W. Today Willowcreek has a Vale mailing address, although the nearest post office is in nearby Jamieson.

== History ==
The community took its name from Willow Creek, a prominent stream of the county that is a tributary of the Malheur River. Willowcreek's Union Pacific (UP) station was named Lancaster (or Lancaster Station) after Lancaster, Pennsylvania. The station was on UP's Brogan Line, which was removed by UP. It was named by Brogan namesake D. M. Brogan, who was born in the Pennsylvania city. Willowcreek post office had been established in 1937 but was discontinued by 1980.

== Education ==
Willowcreek Elementary School is part of the Vale School District. It covers grades 1-8. The same district operates Vale High School, its only high school. Kindergarten is at Vale Elementary School.
