= North Fork Malheur River =

- Location of the mouth of the North Fork Malheur River in Oregon
- Etymology: From the French malheur (bad fortune), applied by French Canadian hunters whose cache of furs near the river were stolen

Location
- Country: United States
- State: Oregon
- County: Baker, Grant, Harney, Malheur

Physical characteristics
- Source: Blue Mountains
  - location: Big Cow Burn, Baker County
  - coordinates: 44°21′58″N 118°24′16″W
  - elevation: 6,884 ft (2,098 m)
- Mouth: Malheur River
  - location: Juntura, Malheur County
  - coordinates: 43°45′25″N 118°03′40″W
  - elevation: 2,923 ft (891 m)
- Length: 59 mi (95 km)
- Basin size: 550 sq mi (1,400 km^{2})
- Discharge
  - location: Beulah, 14.5 miles (23.3 km) from the mouth
  - average: 87.9 cu ft/s (2.49 m^{3}/s)
  - minimum: 0 cu ft/s (0 m^{3}/s)
  - maximum: 7,000 cu ft/s (200 m^{3}/s)

National Wild and Scenic River
- Type: Scenic
- Designated: October 28, 1988

The North Fork Malheur River is a 59-mile (95 km) tributary of the Malheur River in eastern Oregon in the United States. Rising in Big Cow Burn in the Blue Mountains, it flows generally south to join the larger river at Juntura. The upper 25.5 miles (41.0 km) of the river have been designated Wild and Scenic. This part of the river basin offers camping, hiking, and fishing opportunities in a remote forest setting. The lower river passes through Beulah Reservoir, which stores water for irrigation and has facilities for boaters.

== Course ==
The river begins at Big Cow Burn in western Baker County, just west of the western edge of the Wallowa–Whitman National Forest and about 15 miles (24 km) southwest of Prairie City. Flowing generally south through the Malheur National Forest, the North Fork receives Horseshoe and Deadhorse creeks from the right, then Flat and Spring creeks from the left, followed by Swamp Creek from the right. Further downstream, Cow, Little Cow, and Sheep creeks enter from the right before Eopian Creek enters from the left and then Short Creek from the right.

Below Short Creek, the river leaves Baker County and enters Grant County. Elk Creek enters from the right and Telephone Gulch from the left before the river reaches North Fork Campground and Stink Creek, which enters from the left. Dugout Creek enters from the left before the river passes under a footbridge carrying a hiking trail running parallel to the stream. Crane Creek enters from the right at Crane Creek Campground. Further downstream, Sage Hen Gulch enters from the left.

Passing through a canyon downstream of Sage Hen Gulch, the river receives Skagway Creek from the left before turning southeast and receiving Bear Creek from the right before leaving Grant County and entering Harney County. Beyond the county boundary Little Malheur River enters from the left. Continuing southeast, the North Fork leaves Harney County and enters Malheur County. Castle Rock Creek enters from the left, and below this the river enters Beulah Reservoir.

As it leaves the reservoir, the river passes a stream gauge at Beulah, 14.5 miles (23.3 km) from the mouth. South of the reservoir, Mud Springs and McClellan gulches enter from the right, and Whitley Canyon from the left. Cottonwood and Halladay gulches then enter from the right. After entering Juntura Valley, the river receives Kingsbury Gulch from the right and Curry Canyon from the left. Flowing north of and roughly parallel to U.S. Route 20 in the valley, the river turns east as it reaches Juntura and empties into the Malheur River, a tributary of the Snake River.

The first 25.5 miles (41.0 km) of the river, from its headwaters to where it leaves the Malheur National Forest, has been protected since 1988 as part of the National Wild and Scenic Rivers System. Of the river's total length of 59 miles (95 km), about 43 percent is Wild and Scenic.

=== Discharge ===
The United States Geological Survey monitors the flow of the North Fork Malheur River. The average flow of the river at Beulah is 87.9 cubic feet per second (2.5 m^{3}/s). This is from a drainage area of 440 square miles (1,140 km^{2}), 80 percent of the total North Fork watershed. The maximum flow recorded there was 7,000 cubic feet per second (198 m^{3}/s) on May 7, 1942, during a flood caused by failure of the gates at Agency Valley Dam. The minimum flow was 0 cubic feet per second (0 m^{3}/s) on multiple occasions.

== Recreation ==
The North Fork offers opportunities for camping, hiking, and fishing in a remote and scenic setting. North Fork Campground offers tent and trailer camping, and Crane Crossing Campground, which more remote, has tent camping. These campgrounds are primitive; although they have tables, toilets, and firerings, they have no drinkable water. North Fork Malheur Trail provides access to the 12.4 miles (20.0 km) of the river between Crane Crossing and the southern boundary of the Malheur National Forest.

Further downstream, the Malheur County Parks Department maintains boating facilities at Beulah Reservoir on the North Fork of the Malheur River. These include a parking lot, boat ramp, and restroom, all near the dam, 15 miles (24 km) north of Juntura on a gravel road. Used mainly for irrigation storage, the lake fluctuates in size from season to season; it is generally high in the spring and low in the fall. At its maximum, the lake covers 1,900 acres (770 ha).

The river is a productive trout stream. Great Basin redband trout, rainbow trout, and bull trout inhabit the river above Beulah Reservoir. Fishing is limited to artificial flies and lures, and bull trout, which are threatened, must be released unharmed. The river downstream of the reservoir flows mostly through private ranchland, and access is restricted.

== See also ==
- List of longest streams of Oregon
- List of National Wild and Scenic Rivers
- List of rivers of Oregon
