= Riverside, Malheur County, Oregon =

Unincorporated community in the state of Oregon, United States

Riverside, Oregon
- Unincorporated community
- Location within Oregon Location within the United States
- Coordinates: 43°32′30″N 118°09′33″W
- Country: United States
- State: Oregon
- County: Malheur
- Elevation: 3,343 ft (1,019 m)
- Time zone: UTC-7 (Mountain (MST))
  - Summer (DST): UTC-6 (MDT)
- Area code: 541
- GNIS feature ID: 1136689

Riverside is an unincorporated community in Malheur County, Oregon, United States. It is part of the Ontario, Oregon–Idaho Micropolitan Statistical Area. It is northeast of Crane and south of Juntura along Juntura–Riverside Road and the South Fork Malheur River near its confluence with the main stem.

The Riverside Wildlife Area, managed by the Oregon Department of Fish and Wildlife, is along the Malheur River canyon near Riverside. Encompassing 3,798 acres (1,537 ha), it provides public access to fishing, hunting, and wildlife viewing in a remote area that is otherwise privately owned.

Riverside post office was established in 1889, with Teresa E. McRae as postmaster. The office, with a ZIP code of 97917, was discontinued in 2008.

== Climate ==
Riverside has a steppe climate (BSk) according to the Köppen climate classification system.

Climate data for Riverside, Oregon, 1991–2020 normals, extremes 1897–2012
Month	Jan	Feb	Mar	Apr	May	Jun	Jul	Aug	Sep	Oct	Nov	Dec	Year
Record high °F (°C)	65 (18)	71 (22)	78 (26)	92 (33)	102 (39)	106 (41)	111 (44)	108 (42)	100 (38)	93 (34)	82 (28)	68 (20)	111 (44)
Mean maximum °F (°C)	51.8 (11.0)	57.8 (14.3)	70.7 (21.5)	80.7 (27.1)	89.4 (31.9)	96.6 (35.9)	102.4 (39.1)	99.9 (37.7)	93.6 (34.2)	81.6 (27.6)	65.8 (18.8)	52.4 (11.3)	103.1 (39.5)
Mean daily maximum °F (°C)	39.7 (4.3)	46.5 (8.1)	56.7 (13.7)	63.6 (17.6)	72.6 (22.6)	81.8 (27.7)	92.7 (33.7)	90.5 (32.5)	81.7 (27.6)	66.6 (19.2)	49.0 (9.4)	39.1 (3.9)	65.0 (18.4)
Daily mean °F (°C)	30.5 (−0.8)	34.4 (1.3)	41.9 (5.5)	46.9 (8.3)	54.9 (12.7)	62.4 (16.9)	70.7 (21.5)	67.9 (19.9)	59.3 (15.2)	47.8 (8.8)	36.2 (2.3)	29.7 (−1.3)	48.6 (9.2)
Mean daily minimum °F (°C)	21.2 (−6.0)	22.4 (−5.3)	27.1 (−2.7)	30.3 (−0.9)	37.1 (2.8)	43.0 (6.1)	48.7 (9.3)	45.4 (7.4)	36.9 (2.7)	28.9 (−1.7)	23.4 (−4.8)	20.2 (−6.6)	32.0 (0.0)
Mean minimum °F (°C)	0.8 (−17.3)	3.9 (−15.6)	13.4 (−10.3)	16.7 (−8.5)	22.1 (−5.5)	30.7 (−0.7)	36.8 (2.7)	34.8 (1.6)	23.4 (−4.8)	14.1 (−9.9)	7.7 (−13.5)	−1.5 (−18.6)	−9.1 (−22.8)
Record low °F (°C)	−44 (−42)	−36 (−38)	−12 (−24)	8 (−13)	10 (−12)	20 (−7)	23 (−5)	16 (−9)	10 (−12)	−4 (−20)	−9 (−23)	−53 (−47)	−53 (−47)
Average precipitation inches (mm)	1.02 (26)	0.82 (21)	1.04 (26)	0.87 (22)	1.32 (34)	0.77 (20)	0.47 (12)	0.32 (8.1)	0.37 (9.4)	0.61 (15)	1.08 (27)	1.38 (35)	10.07 (255.5)
Average precipitation days (≥ 0.01 in)	6.7	5.7	7.4	7.3	7.1	5.0	2.6	2.2	2.4	4.0	7.7	7.5	65.6
Source 1: NOAA (precip/precip days, mean maxima/minima 1981–2010)
Source 2: National Weather Service

== Education ==
The community is in Juntura School District 12, based in Juntura.
