= Juntura School District 12 =

School district in Oregon, United States

Juntura School District 12 is an elementary school district based in Juntura, Oregon, entirely located in Malheur County. It operates Juntura Grade School, a.k.a. Juntura Elementary School, a K-8 school. As of 2003 the school has two teachers as one teacher is not permitted to take all of the grade levels.

In 1975 the school began paying students to do janitorial work after the teacher, who previously worked at Fields. The janitorial duties each student has were rotated weekly. The students used the money to fund field trips. The money, as of 1979, was augmented by interest as it was placed in a savings account. In 1979 the school had 26 students, with 11 in grades 5-7 and none in the 8th grade.

Circa 2003 the school often had about six students, with three per class. In the 2016-2017 school year, enrollment was initially five and went down to two because the remaining three students moved elsewhere. Kathleen Schram, the principal, stated that she expected that there would be more students later due to demographic patterns. In 2023, all of the board members of the Juntura district left their posts at the same time as they disliked a new ethics rule from the State of Oregon.

== Feeder patterns ==
As of 2009 area high school students attend various schools, including Crane Union High School in Crane, Harper School in Harper, Ontario High School of the Ontario School District 8C, Vale High School of the Vale School District, and Burns High School of the Harney County School District 3. In an article in the East Oregonian published that year, an area resident stated that the fact that students may board at Crane meant that "Lots of the kids go on to Crane for high school". In 1979 students who attended Vale High lived in Vale on weekdays.
