= Vale High School =

Location
- 505 Viking Drive; Vale, (Malheur County), Oregon 97918; United States; 43.978848°N 117.252638°W

Information
- Type: Public
- School district: Vale School District 84
- Principal: Chad Hartley
- Teaching staff: 19.50 (FTE)
- Grades: 9-12
- Enrollment: 293 (2024–2025)
- Student to teacher ratio: 15.03
- Colors: Black and white
- Athletics conference: OSAA Eastern Oregon League 3A-5
- Mascot: Viking
- Website: vhs.valesd.org

Vale High School is a public high school in Vale, Oregon, United States. It is a part of Vale School District 84.

The Vale School District takes students from Vale and Brogan, as well as the unincorporated community of Willowcreek. As of 1979, Vale High School also includes students from Juntura, which is in Juntura School District 12 (a K-8 school district). As of 2009, some students in the Juntura area attended Vale High.

== History ==
Vale High School was formerly part of the Vale Union High School District and known as Vale Union High School. A 1992 referendum approved the consolidation of the Vale Union High School District, Vale Elementary School District, Willowcreek School District, and the Brogan School District, which led to the present Vale School District 84.

The current campus was constructed in 1954. Later additions include a computer lab and library, finished in 1998.

== Academics ==
The graduation rate has risen over recent years, even as graduating classes vary in size. In 2008, the school's graduation rate was 87%, with 80 of the 92 senior students receiving a high school diploma. In 2022, the school's graduation rate was 99%, with 66 of the 67 senior students receiving a high school diploma.

As of 2026, Vale High School is ranked #4,878 in the country, and #48 in the state of Oregon. This placed Vale High School as the highest ranked non-charter high school in the Ontario Micropolitan Statistical Area. Additionally, Vale High School ranked fifth among all Oregon high schools in state assessment performance.

== Athletics ==
Vale High School competes at the Oregon 3A classification level in the Eastern Oregon League and offers the following competitive sports:

- American Football (boys'),
- Baseball (boys'),
- Basketball (boys' and girls'),
- Cross Country (boys' and girls'),
- Golf (boys' and girls'),
- Softball (girls'),
- Tennis (boys' and girls'),
- Track and Field (boys' and girls'),
- Volleyball (girls'),
- Wrestling (boys' and girls').

== Notable alumni ==
- Lynn Findley (1970), Oregon state representative
- Dave Wilcox (1960), NFL linebacker (1964–74), Pro Football Hall of Fame (2000)
- John Wilcox (1956), NFL defensive tackle (1960), Super Bowl champion (1960), coach
- Janice Kapp Perry (1956), composer, songwriter, author
