= Bully Creek (Malheur River tributary) =

River in Oregon, United States of America

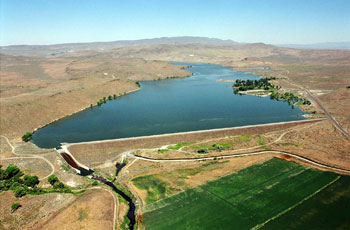
- Bully Creek Dam

- Location of the mouth of Bully Creek in Oregon

Location
- Country: United States
- State: Oregon
- County: Malheur

Physical characteristics
- Source: Sheep Rock
  - location: Blue Mountains, Malheur County, Oregon
  - coordinates: 44°05′25″N 118°05′55″W
  - elevation: 4,278 ft (1,304 m) (Note: Source elevation derived from Google Earth search using GNIS source coordinates.)
- Mouth: Malheur River
  - location: near Vale, Malheur County, Oregon
  - coordinates: 43°58′30″N 117°14′24″W
  - elevation: 2,244 ft (684 m)
- Length: 62 mi (100 km)
- Basin size: 601 sq mi (1,560 km^{2})
- Discharge
  - location: river mile 5 (river kilometer 8)
  - average: 40.4 cu ft/s (1.14 m^{3}/s) (Note: The average discharge rate for this location was calculated by adding the average annual discharge rates for the total number of water years for which data was available and dividing by the total number of water years.)
  - minimum: 0 cu ft/s (0 m^{3}/s)(June/July 1934)
  - maximum: 8,980 cu ft/s (254 m^{3}/s)(February 24, 1957)

Bully Creek is a 62-mile (100 km) long tributary of the Malheur River, located in the U.S. state of Oregon. It drains 601 square miles (1,557 km^{2}) of Malheur County. Arising in the Blue Mountains, it flows generally southeast to its confluence with the Malheur River near Vale.

== Course ==
Bully Creek's headwaters are located near Sheep Rock in the southern edge of the Blue Mountains, southwest of Ironside. It flows east, receiving Indian and Cottonwood creeks on the right, and Clover Creek on the left. Traveling through the community of Westfall, the creek turns northeast. It is impounded by the 161-foot (49 m) tall Bully Creek Dam at river mile (RM) 8 or river kilometer (RK) 13, forming Bully Creek Reservoir. From the reservoir, the creek flows southeast until it reaches Highway 20. It parallels the highway and the Malheur River for several miles, passing through the outskirts of Vale. Bully Creek flows into the Malheur approximately 20 miles (32 km) above its confluence with the Snake River, which in turn flows into the Columbia River, and ultimately the Pacific Ocean.

== Watershed ==
Bully Creek drains 601 square miles (1,557 km^{2}) of eastern Oregon. Wedged between the Northern Basin and Range and the Blue Mountains ecoregions, the watershed experiences an arid climate. Precipitation ranges from 9 to 23 inches (229 to 584 mm), with an average of 12 inches (305 mm). The highest elevation in the watershed is 6,447 feet (1,965 m) at Juniper Mountain, while the lowest is 2,244 feet (684 m) at the creek's mouth.

== Flora and fauna ==
Two hundred and five species of vertebrates have been identified within the Bully Creek watershed. Large mammals such as Rocky Mountain elk and mule deer, bobcats, beavers, otters, and raccoons inhabit the region. Twenty one species of fish have been spotted, but there are no anadromous species. The threatened bald eagle lives in the watershed during the winter.

The Bully Creek watershed is vegetated primarily by Sagebrush, although Quaking Aspen, Water Birch, and Cottonwood grow in riparian zones. Several noxious weeds have been identified, including Russian Knapweed and White Top.

== History ==
The first humans arrived in the Bully Creek watershed about 13,000 years ago. The Northern Paiute tribe of Native Americans migrated to the region approximately 1,000 years ago. Whites first arrived in 1811 when fur traders from the Pacific Fur Company passed through. The Oregon Trail passed through the area in the 1840s, 50s, and 60s.

Melting snow and heavy rain caused the Jordan dam to fail on Bully Creek 19 miles (31 km) west of Vale on February 5, 1925. The Jordan dam was cheaply built only 2 years prior for irrigation purposes by investors who wanted to plant wineries in the Willowcreek Valley. The builders used the naturally found shale rock in the concrete mix leading to the failure of the dam. Flood waters surged down the creek, submerging Vale in 3 feet (1 m) of water, producing widespread damage. A railroad bridge and parts of Highway 20 were washed out, and many cattle and properties were destroyed. Overall, the flood caused over $500,000 in damage. Bully Creek Dam was constructed in 1963, used primarily for irrigation and flood control.

== See also ==
- List of longest streams of Oregon
- List of rivers of Oregon
