= Agency Valley Dam =

Dam in Malheur County, Oregon, U.S.

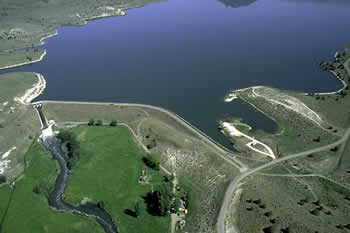
- Agency Valley Dam
- Interactive map of Agency Valley Dam
- Country: United States
- Location: Malheur County, Oregon
- Coordinates: 43°54′43″N 118°09′14″W
- Purpose: Irrigation

Dam and spillways
- Type of dam: Earth fill dam
- Impounds: North Fork Malheur River
- Height (foundation): 110 ft (34 m)

Reservoir
- Creates: Beulah Reservoir
- Total capacity: 59,200 acre⋅ft (73,000,000 m^{3})
- Surface area: 2,000 acres (810 ha)
- Normal elevation: 3,343 ft (1,019 m)

Agency Valley Dam (National ID # OR00589) is a dam in Oregon, United States, built on the North Fork Malheur River in the eastern part of the state, immediately north of the small town of Beulah in Malheur County. The dam impounds the river to create Beulah Reservoir.

The dam is an earthen facility, 110 foot high, with a reservoir capacity of 59,200 acre-feet (73,000,000 m^{3}). This was an irrigation and water-control project of the United States Bureau of Reclamation completed in 1935; no hydroelectric power is generated here.

When full the Beulah Reservoir surface covers about 2,000 acres (810 ha). Compared to the other two reservoirs in the area's Vale Project, Warm Springs Reservoir and Bully Creek Reservoir, Beulah provides the best opportunities for recreation: camping, fishing, powerboating and water-skiing.
