= Jonesboro, Oregon =

Former unincorporated community in Oregon, United States

Coordinates: 43°47′45″N 117°54′53″W

Jonesboro (/ˈdʒoʊnzbʌrə/) was an unincorporated community in Malheur County, Oregon, United States. It is located on U.S Route 20, between Juntura and Harper, near the Malheur River.

Jonesboro was a station on the Union Pacific Railroad. It was named for William Jones, a local cattle rancher. The now torn-up railroad line was decommissioned in the early 1990s.
