= Dave Wilcox =

American football player (1942–2023)

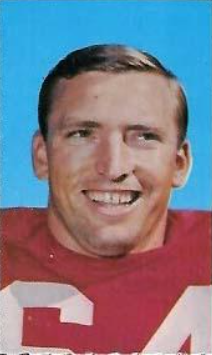
- Wilcox in 1969 stamp

No. 64
- Position: Linebacker

Personal information
- Born: September 29, 1942; Ontario, Oregon, U.S.
- Died: April 19, 2023 (aged 80)
- Listed height: 6 ft 3 in (1.91 m)
- Listed weight: 241 lb (109 kg)

Career information
- High school: Vale (Vale, Oregon)
- College: Boise (1960–1961); Oregon (1962–1963)
- NFL draft: 1964: 3rd round, 29th overall pick
- AFL draft: 1964: 6th round, 46th overall pick

Career history
- San Francisco 49ers (1964–1974)

Awards and highlights
- 2× First-team All-Pro (1971, 1972); 2× Second-team All-Pro (1967, 1973); 7× Pro Bowl (1966, 1968–1973); San Francisco 49ers Hall of Fame

Career NFL statistics
- Sacks: 36.5
- Interceptions: 14
- Interception yards: 149
- Fumble recoveries: 12
- Defensive touchdowns: 2
- Stats at Pro Football Reference
- Pro Football Hall of Fame

David Wilcox (September 29, 1942 – April 19, 2023), nicknamed "the Intimidator", was an American professional football linebacker who played with the San Francisco 49ers of the National Football League (NFL) from 1964 through 1974. Named to play in seven Pro Bowls and an All-Pro five times, Wilcox played college football at Boise Junior College and the University of Oregon. Selected by the 49ers in the third round of the 1964 NFL draft, he was also taken by the Houston Oilers in the sixth round of the 1964 AFL draft, but opted for the NFL. Wilcox was elected to the Pro Football Hall of Fame in 2000.

== College career ==
After graduating from Vale High School in eastern Oregon in 1960, Wilcox began his college football career at Boise Junior College (now Boise State University) and earned junior college All-America honors. After two years in Boise under head coach Lyle Smith, he transferred to the University of Oregon in Eugene in 1962 for his final two campaigns under head coach Len Casanova. His older brother John Wilcox was on the 1957 Ducks team which played in the Rose Bowl, and was selected in the 1960 NFL draft by the Philadelphia Eagles (15th round).

Wilcox was a guard on offense and an end on defense, and teammates at Oregon included Mel Renfro and quarterback Bob Berry. After his senior season in 1963, Wilcox played in the Hula Bowl, Coaches’ All-America Bowl, and the College All-Star Game the following August. He became the first defensive lineman in Hula Bowl history to earn outstanding lineman honors. Both the Houston Oilers of the young American Football League and the San Francisco 49ers of the NFL sought to sign the Oregon star. The Oilers selected him in the sixth round (46th player overall) of the 1964 AFL draft; the 49ers tapped him in the third round (29th overall) of the NFL draft, held two days later.

== Professional career ==
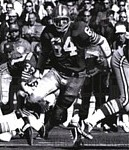
Wilcox playing for the 49ers

The 6 ft 3 in (1.91 m), 241-pound (109 kg) Wilcox opted to sign with the 49ers where he went on to star for 11 seasons. Converted to outside linebacker, he was known as "the Intimidator”.

During the 1964–1974 span, the 49ers made the playoffs in three consecutive seasons (1970, 1971, 1972) under head coach Dick Nolan. In 1970, San Francisco won the NFC West division title with a win-lost-tie record of 10–3–1. In a divisional game of the 1970 NFL Playoffs, San Francisco defeated the Minnesota Vikings 17–14, holding them to 124 net passing yards and 117 yards rushing. However, they lost the NFC championship game to the Dallas Cowboys.

In 1971, the 49ers allowed only 216 points (15.4 points/game), 6th-least in the NFL, and won the NFC West with a record of 9–5. They won their divisional game of the 1971 NFL Playoffs over the Washington Redskins, allowing only 99 yards rushing and 93 net passing yards, but again lost the NFC championship game to Dallas. In 1972, San Francisco won the NFC West for the third straight year with a record of 8–5–1, allowing on defense 249 points (17.8 points/game), 9th in the league. But they lost their divisional game of the 1972 NFL Playoffs to Dallas, thus eliminated by the Cowboys three consecutive years.

After each season, San Francisco would rate their players based on their performance. The typical score for a linebacker was 750. Wilcox's score in 1973 was 1,306. That season the veteran linebacker recorded 104 solo tackles, four forced fumbles, and tackled opposing ball carriers for a loss 13 times.

Four times Wilcox was named All-NFL (1967, 1971, 1972, 1973) by the AP and two times All-NFC (1971, 1972). He was also selected to play in seven Pro Bowls.

== Personal life and death ==
Born in the eastern Oregon city of Ontario, Wilcox had six sisters and a brother, John. Dave Wilcox played high school football at nearby Vale Union High School. He lived in Junction City, near Eugene; his sons Justin and Josh also played football for the Oregon Ducks in Eugene. Justin was the head coach at Cal from 2017 to 2025.

Wilcox died on April 19, 2023, at the age of 80, shortly after having undergone heart surgery.
