= John Wilcox (American football) =

American football player (born 1938)

No. 71
- Position: Defensive tackle

Personal information
- Born: March 15, 1938 (age 88); Vale, Oregon, U.S.
- Listed height: 6 ft 5 in (1.96 m)
- Listed weight: 230 lb (104 kg)

Career information
- High school: Vale (OR)
- College: Boise State (1956-1957); Oregon (1958-1959)
- NFL draft: 1960: 15th round, 175th overall pick
- AFL draft: 1960

Career history
- Philadelphia Eagles (1960)

Awards and highlights
- NFL champion (1960)
- Stats at Pro Football Reference

John Dale Wilcox (born March 15, 1938) is an American former professional football defensive tackle for the Philadelphia Eagles.

== Early life ==
Wilcox won two state titles with Vale High School. He first went to Boise Junior College (now Boise State University) before transferring to the University of Oregon in Eugene to play for the Webfoots. Wilcox led the Webfoots (now Ducks) to the 1958 Rose Bowl, which they lost 10–7. He graduated from Oregon in 1959.

== Playing career ==
Wilcox was small for a defensive end, drafted late by the Philadelphia Eagles in 1960. He played 12 games while the Eagles won the NFL title that year. Rather than return to the team, Wilcox decided to retire, citing the small salary ($7,500) and the toil it might have taken on his body.

== Later life ==
With the money Wilcox earned from playing football, he bought a house. He originally wanted to enter the military draft, but he decided to instead be a teacher and coach, in part due to deferments offered by the President for math and science teachers. After a few stints at high schools in Portland and Boise, he arrived at Whitman College in 1967. He served as an assistant coach at Whitman College from 1967 to 1975, as they won a share of the conference title. He also served as the men's basketball coach during the 1970s and the women's basketball coach during the 1980s, leading the girls to five playoff appearances, a conference title and 178 wins. He was inducted into the Whitman Hall of Fame.

== Personal life ==
He has been married to Remy Barnes for over 50 years and has three children and seven grandkids. He is the brother of Pro Football Hall of Fame inductee Dave Wilcox and uncle of NFL player Josh Wilcox and former California head coach Justin Wilcox.
