= Oregon statistical areas =

Coordinates: 43.9336°N 120.5583°W

The U.S. State of Oregon currently has 24 statistical areas that have been delineated by the Office of Management and Budget (OMB). On July 21, 2023, the OMB delineated four combined statistical areas, eight metropolitan statistical areas, and 12 micropolitan statistical areas in Oregon. As of 2025, the largest of these is the Portland–Vancouver–Salem, OR-WA CSA, anchored by Oregon's largest city, Portland and including its capital, Salem.

== Statistical areas ==
The Office of Management and Budget (OMB) has designated more than 1,000 statistical areas for the United States and Puerto Rico. These statistical areas are important geographic delineations of population clusters used by the OMB, the United States Census Bureau, planning organizations, and federal, state, and local government entities.

The OMB defines a core-based statistical area (commonly referred to as a CBSA) as the county or counties (or county-equivalents) surrounding at least one densely-settled core of at least 10,000 population, "plus adjacent counties having a high degree of social and economic integration with the core as measured through commuting ties with the counties containing the core". The OMB further divides core-based statistical areas based on population into metropolitan statistical areas (MSAs) for those with at least 50,000 and micropolitan statistical areas (μSAs) for those with 10,000 to 49,999 people.

The OMB defines a combined statistical area (CSA) as two or more adjacent core-based statistical areas where the employment interchange rate (% commuting from A to B plus % commuting from B to A) is at least 15%. The primary statistical areas (PSAs) include all combined statistical areas and any core-based statistical area that is not a constituent of a combined statistical area.

The 24 United States statistical areas and 36 counties of the State of Oregon (Note: An out-of-state area and its population are displayed in green. An area that extends into more than one state is displayed in purple. A purple population number over a black population number show the total population versus the in-state population. The state's abbreviation is also shown next to the in-state total.)
Combined statistical area	2025 population (est.)	Core-based statistical area	2025 population (est.)	County	2025 population (est.)
Portland–Vancouver–Salem, OR-WA CSA	3,333,552; 2,673,879 (OR)	Portland–Vancouver–Hillsboro, OR-WA MSA	2,542,282; 1,997,494 (OR)	Multnomah County, Oregon	795,391
Portland–Vancouver–Salem, OR-WA CSA	3,333,552; 2,673,879 (OR)	Portland–Vancouver–Hillsboro, OR-WA MSA	2,542,282; 1,997,494 (OR)	Washington County, Oregon	611,708
Portland–Vancouver–Salem, OR-WA CSA	3,333,552; 2,673,879 (OR)	Portland–Vancouver–Hillsboro, OR-WA MSA	2,542,282; 1,997,494 (OR)	Clark County, Washington	532,119
Portland–Vancouver–Salem, OR-WA CSA	3,333,552; 2,673,879 (OR)	Portland–Vancouver–Hillsboro, OR-WA MSA	2,542,282; 1,997,494 (OR)	Clackamas County, Oregon	426,280
Portland–Vancouver–Salem, OR-WA CSA	3,333,552; 2,673,879 (OR)	Portland–Vancouver–Hillsboro, OR-WA MSA	2,542,282; 1,997,494 (OR)	Yamhill County, Oregon	110,024
Portland–Vancouver–Salem, OR-WA CSA	3,333,552; 2,673,879 (OR)	Portland–Vancouver–Hillsboro, OR-WA MSA	2,542,282; 1,997,494 (OR)	Columbia County, Oregon	54,091
Portland–Vancouver–Salem, OR-WA CSA	3,333,552; 2,673,879 (OR)	Portland–Vancouver–Hillsboro, OR-WA MSA	2,542,282; 1,997,494 (OR)	Skamania County, Washington	12,669
Portland–Vancouver–Salem, OR-WA CSA	3,333,552; 2,673,879 (OR)	Salem, OR MSA	445,814	Marion County, Oregon	355,777
Portland–Vancouver–Salem, OR-WA CSA	3,333,552; 2,673,879 (OR)	Salem, OR MSA	445,814	Polk County, Oregon	90,037
Portland–Vancouver–Salem, OR-WA CSA	3,333,552; 2,673,879 (OR)	Albany, OR MSA	132,843	Linn County, Oregon	132,843
Portland–Vancouver–Salem, OR-WA CSA	3,333,552; 2,673,879 (OR)	Longview–Kelso, WA MSA	114,885	Cowlitz County, Washington	114,885
Portland–Vancouver–Salem, OR-WA CSA	3,333,552; 2,673,879 (OR)	Corvallis, OR MSA	97,728	Benton County, Oregon	97,728
none		Eugene–Springfield, OR MSA	381,584	Lane County, Oregon	381,584
Medford–Grants Pass, OR CSA	309,662	Medford, OR MSA	221,795	Jackson County, Oregon	221,795
Medford–Grants Pass, OR CSA	309,662	Grants Pass, OR MSA	87,867	Josephine County, Oregon	87,867
none		Bend, OR MSA	266,376	Deschutes County, Oregon	213,072
none		Bend, OR MSA	266,376	Crook County, Oregon	27,564
none		Bend, OR MSA	266,376	Jefferson County, Oregon	25,740
none		Roseburg, OR μSA	111,951	Douglas County, Oregon	111,951
none		Hermiston–Pendleton, OR μSA	93,721	Umatilla County, Oregon	81,119
none		Hermiston–Pendleton, OR μSA	93,721	Morrow County, Oregon	12,602
none		Klamath Falls, OR μSA	70,274	Klamath County, Oregon	70,274
none		Coos Bay–North Bend, OR μSA	63,992	Coos County, Oregon	63,992
none		Newport, OR μSA	50,636	Lincoln County, Oregon	50,636
none		Astoria, OR μSA	40,926	Clatsop County, Oregon	40,926
Boise City–Mountain Home–Ontario, ID-OR CSA	953,793; 32,261 (OR)	Boise City–Nampa, ID MSA	864,243	Ada County, Idaho	546,141
Boise City–Mountain Home–Ontario, ID-OR CSA	953,793; 32,261 (OR)	Boise City–Nampa, ID MSA	864,243	Canyon County, Idaho	275,123
Boise City–Mountain Home–Ontario, ID-OR CSA	953,793; 32,261 (OR)	Boise City–Nampa, ID MSA	864,243	Gem County, Idaho	21,773
Boise City–Mountain Home–Ontario, ID-OR CSA	953,793; 32,261 (OR)	Boise City–Nampa, ID MSA	864,243	Owyhee County, Idaho	12,661
Boise City–Mountain Home–Ontario, ID-OR CSA	953,793; 32,261 (OR)	Boise City–Nampa, ID MSA	864,243	Boise County, Idaho	8,545
Boise City–Mountain Home–Ontario, ID-OR CSA	953,793; 32,261 (OR)	Ontario, OR-ID μSA	60,085; 32,261 (OR)	Malheur County, Oregon	32,261
Boise City–Mountain Home–Ontario, ID-OR CSA	953,793; 32,261 (OR)	Ontario, OR-ID μSA	60,085; 32,261 (OR)	Payette County, Idaho	27,824
Boise City–Mountain Home–Ontario, ID-OR CSA	953,793; 32,261 (OR)	Mountain Home, ID μSA	29,465	Elmore County, Idaho	29,465
none		The Dalles, OR μSA	26,310	Wasco County, Oregon	26,310
none		La Grande, OR μSA	25,900	Union County, Oregon	25,900
none		Hood River, OR μSA	23,720	Hood River County, Oregon	23,720
Brookings–Crescent City, OR-CA CSA	49,031; 22,621 (OR)	Crescent City, CA μSA	26,410	Del Norte County, California	26,410
Brookings–Crescent City, OR-CA CSA	49,031; 22,621 (OR)	Brookings, OR μSA	22,621	Curry County, Oregon	22,621
none		Baker City, OR μSA	16,658	Baker County, Oregon	16,658
none		none		Tillamook County, Oregon	27,384
none		none		Lake County, Oregon	8,187
none		none		Wallowa County, Oregon	7,595
none		none		Harney County, Oregon	7,380
none		none		Grant County, Oregon	7,075
none		none		Sherman County, Oregon	2,051
none		none		Gilliam County, Oregon	1,971
none		none		Wheeler County, Oregon	1,472
State of Oregon					4,273,586

The 20 core-based statistical areas of the State of Oregon (Note: For CBSAs comprising populations from multiple states, they are listed twice to show both their intrastate population within that CBSA as well as the CBSA's total population. Only the intrastate population is ranked.)
2025 rank	Core-based statistical area	Population				
2025 rank	Core-based statistical area	2025 estimate	Change	2020 Census	Change	2010 Census
1	Portland–Vancouver–Hillsboro, OR-WA MSA (OR)	1,997,494	0.00%	1,997,512	+11.62%	1,789,580
2	Salem, OR MSA	445,814	+2.88%	433,353	+10.91%	390,738
3	Eugene–Springfield, OR MSA	381,584	−0.36%	382,971	+8.89%	351,715
4	Bend, OR MSA	266,376	+7.63%	247,493	+23.48%	200,431
5	Medford, OR MSA	221,795	−0.66%	223,259	+9.87%	203,206
6	Albany, OR MSA	132,843	+3.29%	128,610	+10.23%	116,672
7	Roseburg, OR μSA	111,951	+0.67%	111,201	+3.28%	107,667
8	Corvallis, OR MSA	97,728	+2.67%	95,184	+11.22%	85,579
9	Hermiston–Pendleton, OR μSA	93,721	+1.58%	92,261	+5.97%	87,062
10	Grants Pass, OR MSA	87,867	−0.25%	88,090	+6.50%	82,713
11	Klamath Falls, OR μSA	70,274	+1.24%	69,413	+4.57%	66,380
12	Coos Bay–North Bend, OR μSA	63,992	−1.44%	64,929	+2.99%	63,043
13	Newport, OR μSA	50,636	+0.48%	50,395	+9.47%	46,034
14	Astoria, OR μSA	40,926	−0.36%	41,072	+10.89%	37,039
15	Ontario, OR-ID μSA (OR)	32,261	+2.19%	31,571	+0.82%	31,313
16	The Dalles, OR μSA	26,310	−1.35%	26,670	+5.78%	25,213
17	La Grande, OR μSA	25,900	−1.13%	26,196	+1.74%	25,748
18	Hood River, OR μSA	23,720	−1.07%	23,977	+7.30%	22,346
19	Brookings, OR μSA	22,621	−3.52%	23,446	+4.84%	22,364
20	Baker City, OR μSA	16,658	−0.06%	16,668	+3.31%	16,134
	Ontario, OR-ID μSA	60,085	+2.10%	58,850	+9.11%	53,936
	Portland–Vancouver–Hillsboro, OR-WA MSA	2,542,282	+1.17%	2,512,859	+12.89%	2,226,009

The four combined statistical area of the State of Oregon (Note: For CSAs comprising populations from multiple states, they are listed twice to show both their intrastate population within that CSA as well as the CSA's total population. Only the intrastate population is ranked.)
2025 rank	Combined statistical area	Population				
2025 rank	Combined statistical area	2025 estimate	Change	2020 Census	Change	2010 Census
1	Portland–Vancouver–Salem, OR-WA CSA (OR)	2,673,879	+0.72%	2,654,659	+11.42%	2,382,569
2	Medford–Grants Pass, OR CSA	309,662	−0.54%	311,349	+8.89%	285,919
3	Boise City–Mountain Home–Ontario, ID-OR CSA (OR)	32,261	+2.19%	31,571	+0.82%	31,313
4	Brookings–Crescent City, OR-CA CSA (OR)	22,621	−3.52%	23,446	+4.84%	22,364
	Boise City–Mountain Home–Ontario, ID-OR CSA	953,793	+12.17%	850,341	+21.91%	697,535
	Brookings–Crescent City, OR-CA CSA	49,031	−4.22%	51,189	+0.42%	50,974
	Portland–Vancouver–Salem, OR-WA CSA	3,333,552	+1.61%	3,280,736	+12.30%	2,921,408

== See also ==
- Geography of Oregon
  - Demographics of Oregon
