= Beulah, Oregon =

Unincorporated community in the state of Oregon, United States

- Unincorporated community
- Location within Oregon Location within the United States
- Coordinates: 43°54′24″N 118°09′10″W
- Country: United States
- State: Oregon
- County: Malheur
- Named for: Beulah Arnold, daughter of the community's first postmaster
- Elevation: 3,284 ft (1,001 m)
- Time zone: UTC-7 (Mountain)
  - Summer (DST): UTC-6 (MDT)
- Area code: 541
- GNIS feature ID: 1136064

Beulah is an unincorporated community in Malheur County, in the U.S. state of Oregon. The community lies along the North Fork Malheur River near Beulah Reservoir, 15 miles (24 km) north of Juntura.

The community was named for Beulah Arnold, daughter of Thomas L. Arnold, the community's first postmaster. The post office was established in 1884 and closed in 1947.

== Climate ==
According to the Köppen Climate Classification system, Beulah has a semi-arid climate, abbreviated "BSk" on climate maps.

Climate data for Beulah
Month	Jan	Feb	Mar	Apr	May	Jun	Jul	Aug	Sep	Oct	Nov	Dec	Year
Record high °F (°C)	59 (15)	67 (19)	80 (27)	90 (32)	99 (37)	102 (39)	112 (44)	111 (44)	103 (39)	93 (34)	75 (24)	64 (18)	112 (44)
Mean daily maximum °F (°C)	36.6 (2.6)	43.1 (6.2)	51.8 (11.0)	61.9 (16.6)	70.9 (21.6)	79.7 (26.5)	90.2 (32.3)	89.2 (31.8)	80.1 (26.7)	67 (19)	49 (9)	38.8 (3.8)	63.2 (17.3)
Mean daily minimum °F (°C)	15.9 (−8.9)	20.6 (−6.3)	26.3 (−3.2)	32 (0)	39.6 (4.2)	45.6 (7.6)	52 (11)	50.3 (10.2)	41.1 (5.1)	31.7 (−0.2)	23.9 (−4.5)	18 (−8)	33.1 (0.6)
Record low °F (°C)	−30 (−34)	−25 (−32)	−15 (−26)	14 (−10)	19 (−7)	24 (−4)	28 (−2)	21 (−6)	17 (−8)	2 (−17)	−11 (−24)	−29 (−34)	−30 (−34)
Average precipitation inches (mm)	1.45 (37)	1.01 (26)	1.01 (26)	0.8 (20)	1.19 (30)	0.88 (22)	0.34 (8.6)	0.4 (10)	0.48 (12)	0.75 (19)	1.36 (35)	1.55 (39)	11.22 (285)
Average snowfall inches (cm)	10.3 (26)	4.3 (11)	2.2 (5.6)	0.2 (0.51)	0.1 (0.25)	0 (0)	0 (0)	0 (0)	0 (0)	0.1 (0.25)	3 (7.6)	8.4 (21)	28.7 (73)
Average precipitation days	8	6	7	5	6	5	2	2	3	4	7	8	63
