= Medford metropolitan area =

Medford–Grants Pass
- Combined Statistical Area
- Medford–Grants Pass, OR; Combined Statistical Area
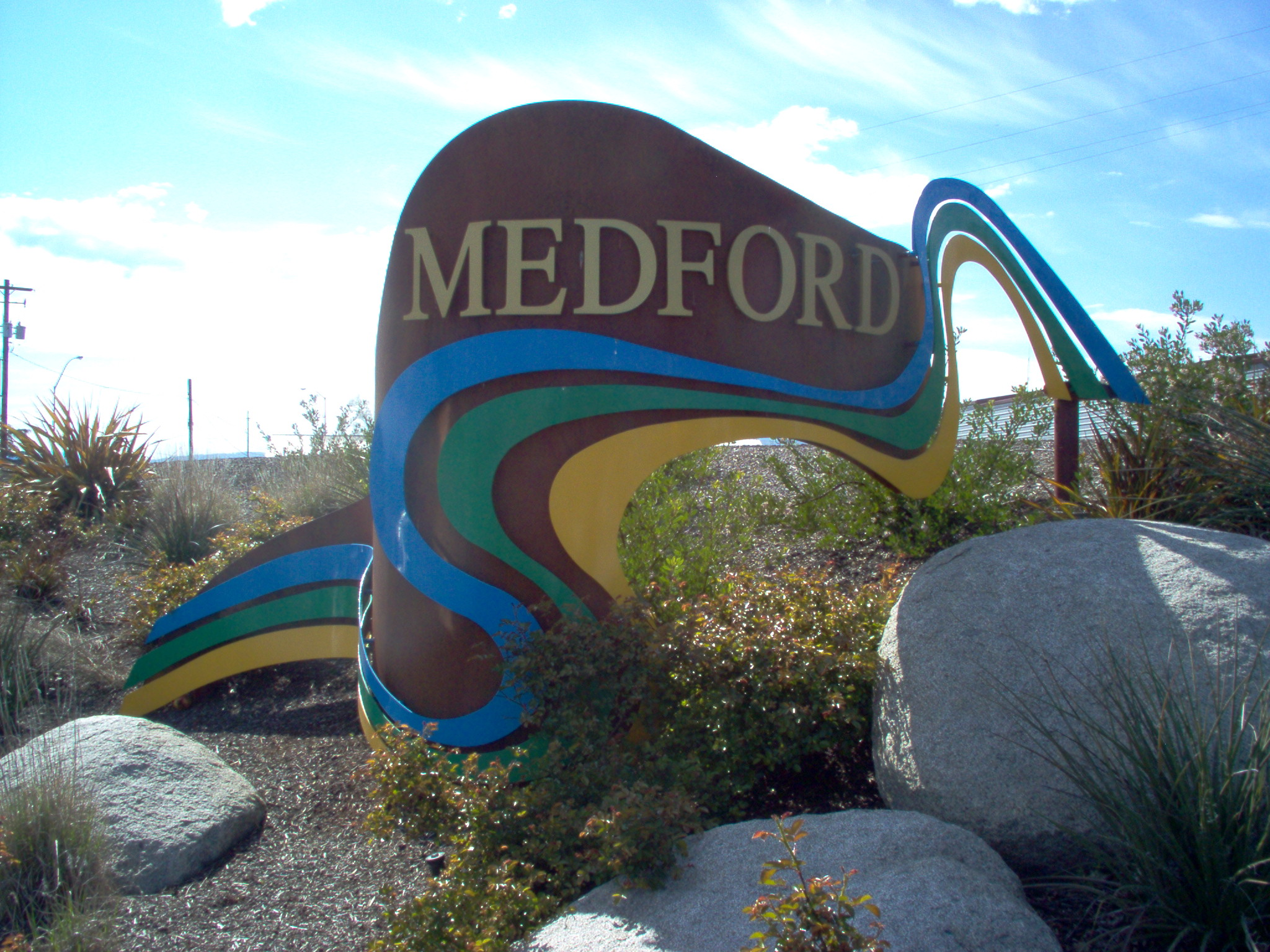
- Welcome sign near the north end of Medford
Interactive map of Medford–Grants Pass, OR CSA
City of Medford
Medford, OR MSA
City of Grants Pass
Grants Pass, OR MSA
- Coordinates: 42°25′56″N 122°43′43″W
- Country: United States
- State: Oregon
- Largest city: Medford
- Other cities: Grants Pass; Ashland; Central Point; Eagle Point
- Highest elevation: 7,047 ft (2,148 m)
- Lowest elevation: 430 ft (131 m)

Population
  - Total: 285,919
  - Rank: 205th in the U.S.
  - Density: 67/sq mi (26/km^{2})

GDP
  - Grants Pass MSA: $3.877 billion (2023)
  - Medford MSA: $12.853 billion (2023)
- Time zone: UTC−8 (PST)
  - Summer (DST): UTC−7 (PDT)

The Medford metropolitan area is a metropolitan area in the U.S. state of Oregon centered on the principal city of Medford, Oregon. The U.S. Office of Management and Budget (OMB) identifies it as the Medford, OR Metropolitan Statistical Area, a metropolitan statistical area used by the United States Census Bureau (USCB) and other entities. The OMB defines the area as comprising all of Jackson County, including Medford, Ashland and Central Point. The Medford metropolitan area also includes Grants Pass in neighboring Josephine County, though the OMB excludes it.

== Metropolitan statistical area ==
The USCB includes Medford and Grants Pass as a combined statistical area called the Medford–Grants Pass, Oregon Combined Statistical Area, comprising both Jackson and Josephine counties. The area's population was estimated at 285,919 in 2010, making it the second largest combined statistical area and the fourth largest metropolitan area in Oregon, after Portland, Salem, and Eugene–Springfield.

== See also ==
- Oregon statistical areas
