= Bully Creek Reservoir =

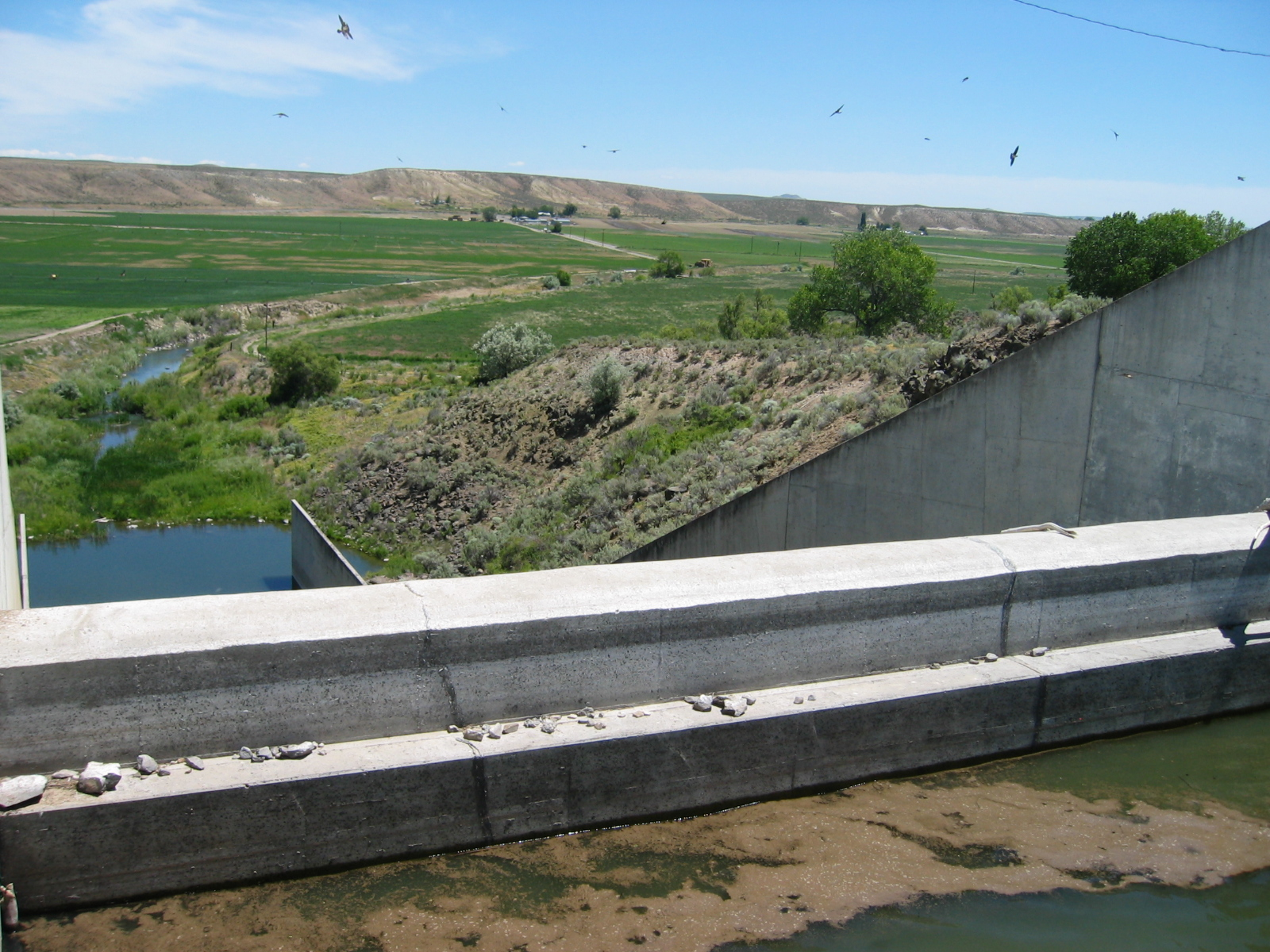
- Swallows hovering over Bully Creek Dam overlooking Bully Creek

- Location of Bully Creek Reservoir in Oregon, USA. Bully Creek Reservoir (the United States)
- Location: Malheur County, Oregon
- Coordinates: 44.013216°N 117.396017°W
- Type: reservoir
- Primary inflows: Bully Creek
- Primary outflows: Bully Creek
- Basin countries: United States
- Surface area: 985 acres (399 ha)
- Water volume: 31,650 acre⋅ft (39,040,000 m^{3})
- Surface elevation: 2,500 ft (760 m)

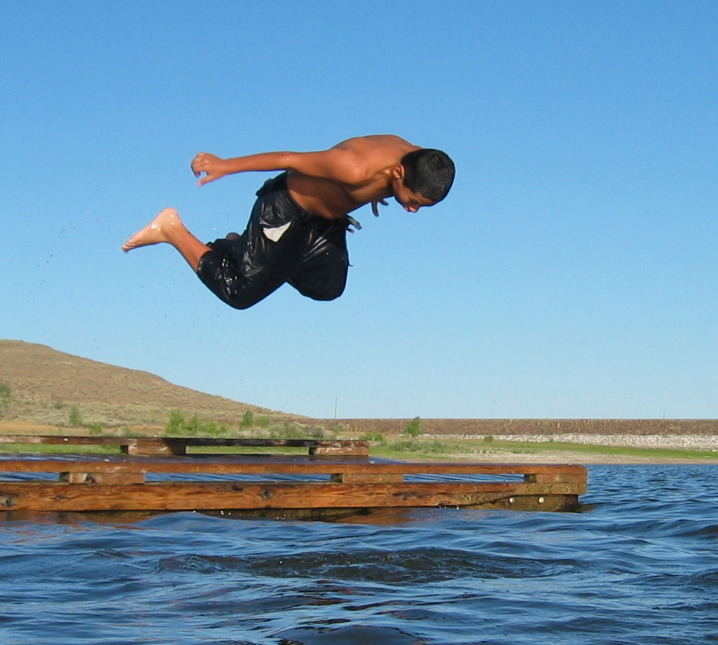
Boy diving off a dock in Bully Creek Reservoir.

Bully Creek Reservoir is a reservoir in Malheur County of the U.S. state of Oregon. It is an impoundment of Bully Creek, a tributary of the Malheur River.

It is a crescent-shaped reservoir located 9 miles (14 km) west of Vale and a 45-minute drive from I-84. The reservoir and its dam have paved road access by Bully Creek Road from Vale W Highway. The reservoir was constructed by the Bureau of Reclamation in 1963 and has 985 acres (399 ha) with 7 miles (11 km) of shoreline and a total capacity of 31,650 acre-feet (39,040,000 m^{3}). The dam is a zoned embankment dam with a crest length of 3,070 feet (940 m), total height of 121 feet (37 m) and sits at 2,500 feet (760 m) elevation. The Bully Creek park is open April through October, has 33 campsites, a day use area with two covered shelters, a swimming beach and a two-lane boat ramp with dock.

== Natural history ==
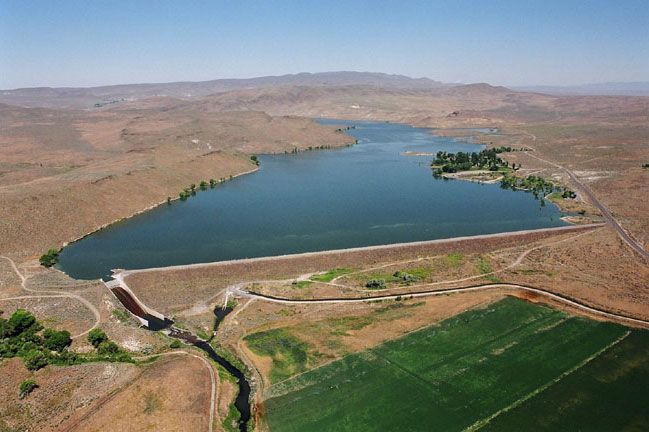
Aerial view to the northwest

Fish species include smallmouth bass, largemouth bass, black bass, rainbow trout, yellow perch, white, and black crappie. The reservoir is used as a resting place by migratory waterfowl with some ducks remaining to nest. Sparse vegetative cover of sagebrush and grass provides habitat for small mammals and birds.

Migrating birds flock the forested areas surrounding the reservoir. Loons, grebes, ducks, and hawks are often seen year round. Rock wrens and golden eagles are occasionally spotted in a nearby red rock formation.

== See also ==
- List of lakes in Oregon
