= Harper School (Harper, Oregon) =

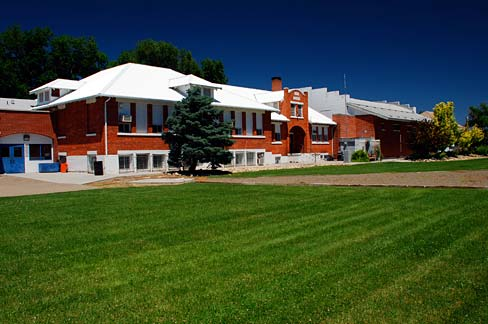

Location
- 2987 Harper Westfall Road; Harper, (Malheur County), Oregon 97906; United States; 43.865642°N 117.608128°W

Information
- Type: Public
- School district: Harper School District
- Principal: Ron Talbot
- Teaching staff: 9.60 (FTE)
- Grades: K-12
- Enrollment: 109 (2017–18)
- Student to teacher ratio: 11.35
- Colors: Blue and gold
- Athletics conference: OSAA High Desert League 1A-8
- Mascot: Hornet
- Website: www.harpersd.org

Harper School is a public K-12 school in Harper, Oregon, United States. It is the only school in the Harper School District 66.

It includes a dormitory facility.

As of 2009 some students in the Juntura area, who are within Juntura School District 12, a K-8 school district, move on to Harper School for high school.

== Academics ==
In 2008, 86% of the school's seniors received their high school diploma. Of seven students, six graduated, none dropped out, and one received a modified diploma.

== See also ==
- List of boarding schools in the United States
