= Juntura, Oregon =

Census-designated place in the state of Oregon, United States

- Census-designated place
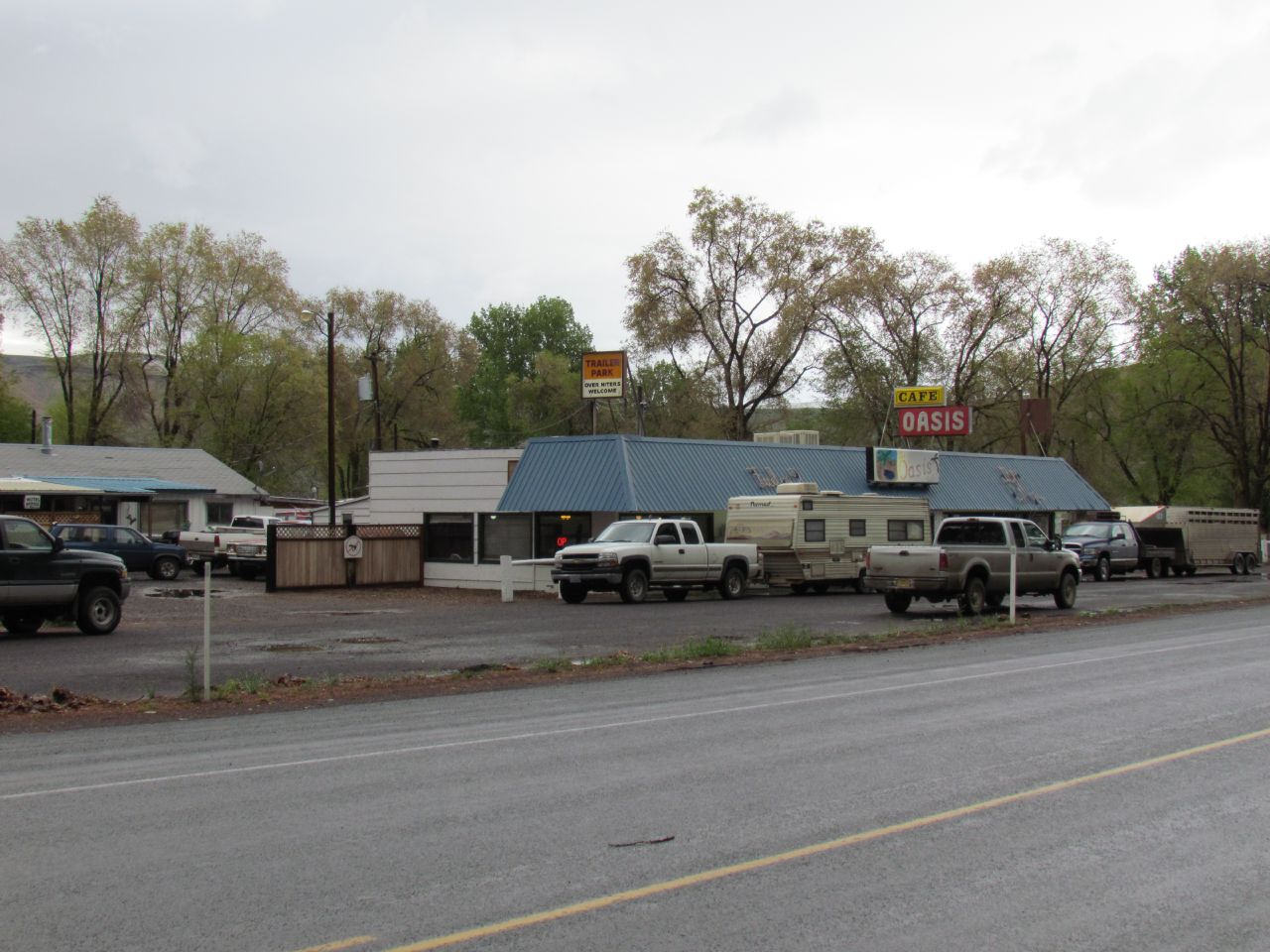
- Juntura roadside café

- Location within Oregon Location within the United States
- Coordinates: 43°45′02″N 118°04′47″W
- Country: United States
- State: Oregon
- County: Malheur
- Post office established: 1890

Area
  - Total: 2.29 sq mi (5.9 km^{2})
  - Land: 2.20 sq mi (5.7 km^{2})
  - Water: 0.0 sq mi (0 km^{2})
- Elevation: 3,044 ft (928 m)

Population (2020)
  - Total: 39
- Time zone: UTC-7 (Mountain (MST))
  - Summer (DST): UTC-6 (Mountain)
- ZIP Code: 97911
- GNIS feature ID: 2611737
- FIPS code: 41-38150

Juntura is an unincorporated community and census-designated place in Malheur County, Oregon, United States, on U.S. Route 20. As of the 2020 census it had a population of 39, down from 57 in 2010. Juntura is part of the Ontario micropolitan area.

== History ==
The word juntura is Spanish for "juncture", and the community was named for its proximity to the confluence of the Malheur River with its North Fork. The name was probably selected by local settler B. L. Milligan, who arrived in the area in the 1880s and who later served as county school superintendent. Juntura post office was established in 1890 and is still operating. The community's development slowed after World War II, and on November 2, 1976, the town voted to disincorporate.

== Geography ==
Juntura is in western Malheur County along U.S. Route 20, which leads east 55 miles (89 km) to Vale and west 58 miles (93 km) to Burns. The Malheur River forms the southeast edge of the community, and the North Fork forms the northeast edge; the rivers join at the eastern edge of the community. The Malheur is an east-flowing tributary of the Snake River, which it joins at the city of Ontario.

According to the U.S. Census Bureau, the Juntura CDP has an area of 2.29 square miles (5.93 km^{2}), all of it recorded as land.

== Climate ==
According to the Köppen Climate Classification system, Juntura has a semi-arid climate, abbreviated "BSk" on climate maps.

== Demographics ==
Historical population
Census	Pop.	Note	%±
1960	98		—
1970	56		−42.9%
2010	57		—
2020	39		−31.6%

As of the 2020 census, there were 39 people, 35 housing units, and 20 families in the CDP. There were 34 White people, 1 Native American, 1 person from some other race, and 3 people from two or more races. 5 people were Hispanic or Latino.

The ancestry of Juntura was 29.6% Irish, 18.5% English, 3.7% German, and 3.7% Scottish. There was also a small number of Chinese at the time of settlement and into the 1920s.

The median age was 64.5 years old. A total of 44.4% of the population were older than 65, with 22.2% between the ages of 65 and 74, 18.5% between the ages of 75 and 84, and 3.7% over 85.

The median household income was $56,250. A total of 25.9% of the population was in poverty, with 46.2% of people between the ages of 18 and 64, and 8.3% of people over 65 were in poverty.

== Transportation ==
In the 21st century, Juntura is a stop on the Eastern POINT intercity bus line between Bend and Ontario. It makes one stop per day in each direction.

== Education ==
It is in the Juntura School District 12, an elementary school district. It operates Juntura Grade School.

As of 2009 area high school students attend various schools, including Crane Union High School in Crane, Harper School in Harper, Ontario High School of the Ontario School District 8C, Vale High School of the Vale School District, and Burns High School of the Harney County School District 3. In an article in the East Oregonian published that year, an area resident stated that the fact that students may board at Crane meant that "Lots of the kids go on to Crane for high school". In 1979 students who attended Vale High lived in Vale on weekdays.

The section of Malheur County in which this community is located is not in any community college district.
