= Ontario micropolitan area, Oregon =

Ontario, OR Micropolitan Area
- Micropolitan Statistical Area
- Ontario, OR Micropolitan Statistical Area
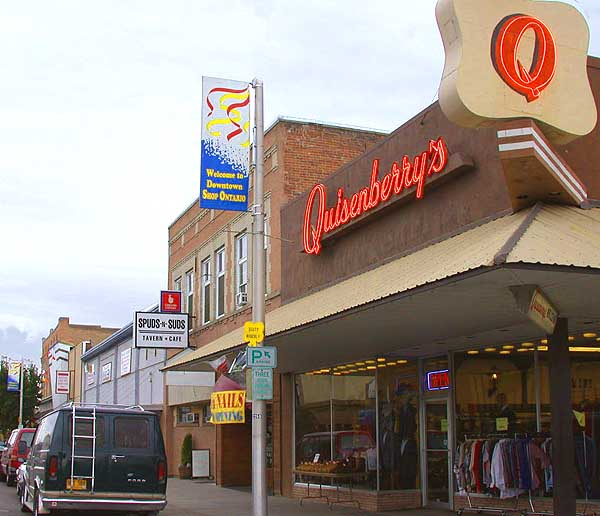
- South Oregon Street in Downtown Ontario
Map of Boise–Mountain Home–Ontario, ID–OR CSA
City of Ontario
Ontario, OR–ID µSA
Other Components of the Boise, ID–OR CSA
- Coordinates: 43°13′34″N 117°35′18″W
- Country: United States
- State: Idaho; Oregon
- Largest city: Boise
- Other cities: Meridian; Nampa; Caldwell; Eagle; Kuna; Mountain Home; Ontario, OR; Payette
- Time zone: UTC-7 (MST)
  - Summer (DST): UTC-6 (MDT)

The Ontario Micropolitan Statistical Area (or Ontario μSA), as defined by the United States Census Bureau, is an area consisting of two counties – one in southeastern Oregon and one in southwestern Idaho, anchored by the city of Ontario.

As of the 2000 census, the area had a population of 52,193 (though a July 1, 2009 estimate placed the population at 53,844).

== Counties ==
- Malheur County, Oregon
- Payette County, Idaho

== Communities ==
- Adrian, Oregon
- Arock, Oregon (unincorporated)
- Brogan, Oregon (unincorporated)
- Fruitland, Idaho
- Jordan Valley, Oregon
- Juntura, Oregon (unincorporated)
- McDermitt, Nevada-Oregon (unincorporated; partial)
- New Plymouth, Idaho
- Nyssa, Oregon
- Ontario, Oregon (Principal city)
- Payette, Idaho (Payette County seat)
- Riverside, Oregon (unincorporated)
- Rome, Oregon (unincorporated)
- Vale, Oregon (Malheur County seat)

== Demographics ==
As of the census of 2000, there were 52,193 people, 17,592 households, and 12,920 families residing within the μSA. The racial makeup of the μSA was 81.49% White, 0.78% African American, 0.96% Native American, 1.52% Asian, 0.06% Pacific Islander, 12.73% from other races, and 2.47% from two or more races. Hispanic or Latino of any race were 20.22% of the population.

The median income for a household in the μSA was $31,644, and the median income for a family was $36,551. Males had a median income of $28,065 versus $21,593 for females. The per capita income for the μSA was $14,410.

== See also ==
- Oregon census statistical areas
- Idaho census statistical areas
