= Four Rivers Community School =

Charter school in Oregon, United States

Four Rivers Community School (4RCC, Spanish: Escuela Comunitaria Cuatro Ríos) is a K-12 charter school in Ontario, Oregon, United States.

The Oregon Board of Education sponsors Four Rivers.

== History ==
It began operations in 2003. Initially the entity establishing the school negotiated with the Ontario School District 8C's school board, but the negotiations were unsuccessful, and the charter school got authorization from the State of Oregon.

In 2013 it had 250 students. 80% of the students were of ethnic backgrounds other than non-Hispanic white, and 80% of the students were classified as being from families with low incomes. Based on these metrics, the school was one of the charter elementaries in Oregon with the highest ethnic diversity levels.

Earlier in 2015 the school proposed getting a grant from the Oregon Department of Education so it could establish a dual English-Spanish literacy program and high level Spanish courses for Four Rivers graduates at Ontario High School of District 8C. In December 2015 Four Rivers discussed establishing its own high school, and the Oregon Board of Education approved the move.

Previously students were allowed to join extracurricular teams at Ontario School District 8C campuses, but the district ended this in 2016. Hunter Marrow of the Argus Observer reported that this caused massive controversy.

== Curriculum ==
As of 2013 the school alternates between instruction in English and instruction in Spanish.

== Feeder patterns ==
When Four Rivers did not have a high school, students went onwards to other high schools. Of the Four Rivers students who were to graduate from high school in 2019, 92% were to graduate from Ontario High School. Of the equivalent group to graduate high school in 2016, 66% attended Ontario High.
