= Horseshoe Creek =

Stream in the U.S. state of Missouri

Horseshoe Creek is a stream in Jackson and Lafayette counties in the U.S. state of Missouri. It is a tributary of Sni-A-Bar Creek.

The stream headwaters arise in western Lafayette County adjacent to Missouri Route TT at 38°58′05″N 94°04′57″W. The stream initially flows to the southeast then makes a broad "horseshoe turn" to continue north roughly parallel to the Lafayette-Jackson county line. The stream flows between Oak Grove and Bates City and passes under Interstate 70. The stream veers west and enters Jackson County prior to its confluence with Sni-A-Bar Creek about two miles north of I-70 at 39°02′29″N 94°06′50″W.

Horseshoe was so named for the fact its many meanders evokes a horseshoe shape.

== See also ==
- List of rivers of Missouri
