= Jamieson, Oregon =

Unincorporated community in the state of Oregon, United States

- Unincorporated community
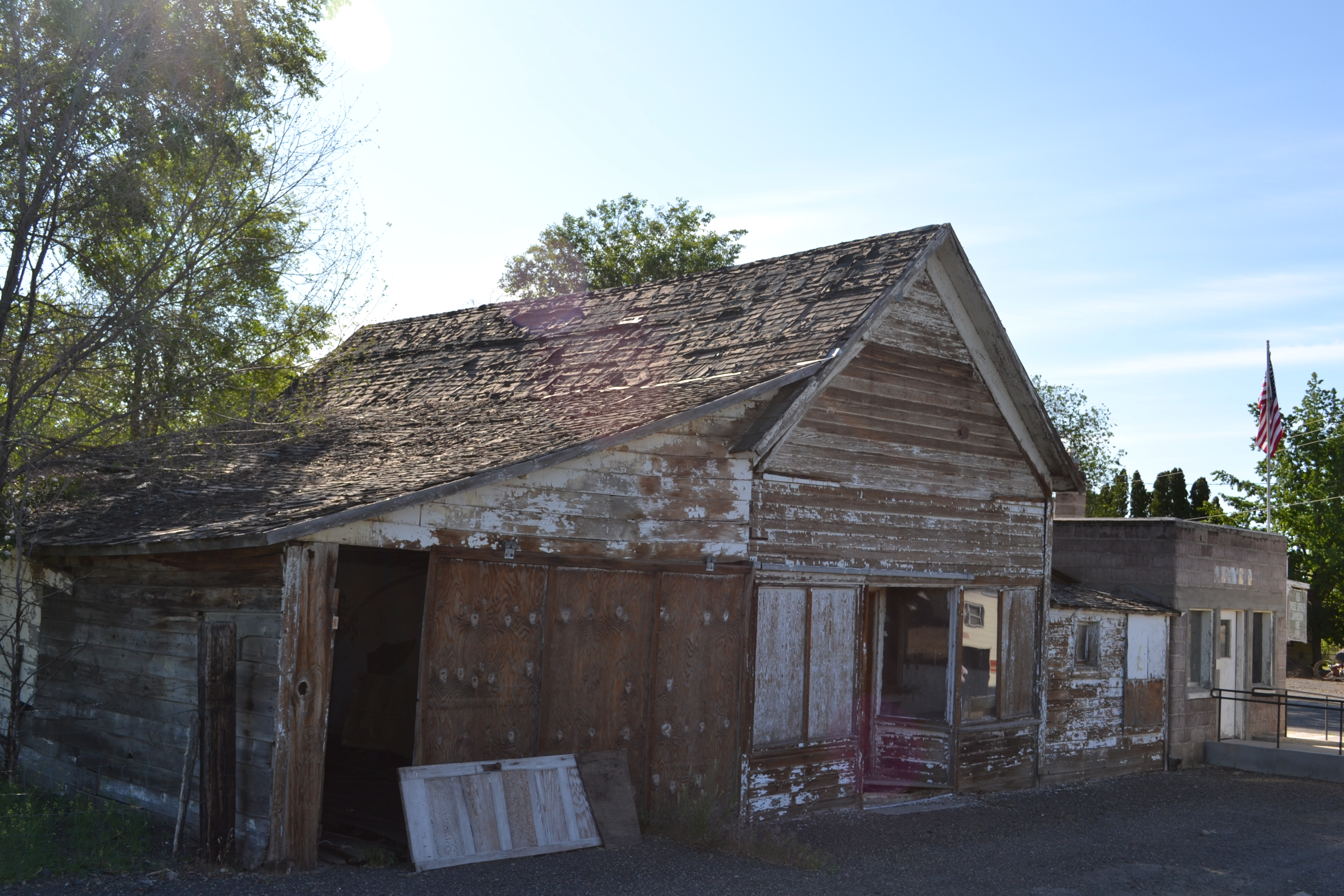
- Abandoned building in Jamieson

- Location within Oregon Location within the United States
- Coordinates: 44°10′56″N 117°26′17″W
- Country: United States
- State: Oregon
- County: Malheur
- Elevation: 2,500 ft (760 m)
- Time zone: UTC-7 (Mountain (MST))
  - Summer (DST): UTC-6 (MDT)
- ZIP code: 97909
- Area code: 541
- GNIS feature ID: 1136418

Jamieson is an unincorporated community in Malheur County, Oregon, United States. The community is 17 miles (27 km) northwest of Vale along U.S. Route 26. Jamieson has a post office with ZIP code 97909.
