= Ontario High School (Oregon) =

Public school in Oregon, United States

Location
- 1115 West Idaho Avenue; Ontario, Oregon 97914; United States; 44°1′47″N 116°58′41″W

Information
- Type: Public
- School district: Ontario School District (8C)
- Principal: Ken Martinez
- Teaching staff: 43.91 (FTE)
- Grades: 9–12
- Enrollment: 691 (2023–2024)
- Student to teacher ratio: 15.74
- Colors: Cardinal and corn
- Athletics conference: OSAA 4A-5 Greater Oregon League
- Nickname: Tigers
- Yearbook: OWACHES
- Website: School website

Ontario High School is a public high school located in Ontario, Oregon, United States. It is a part of Ontario School District 8C.

As of 2009 some students in the Juntura area, who are within Juntura School District 12, a K-8 school district, move on to Ontario High for high school.

== History ==
In 2015, the Four Rivers Community School charter school, originally serving students from kindergarten to eighth grade, put forth a proposal to secure a grant from the Oregon Department of Education with the intention of establishing a dual English-Spanish literacy program and offering high-level Spanish courses to Four Rivers graduates at Ontario High School. However, in December of the same year, Four Rivers altered its plans and instead made a proposal to establish its own high school.

== Demographics ==
The demographic breakdown of the 726 students enrolled in 2013-2014 was:

- Male - 48.5%
- Female - 51.5%
- Native American/Alaskan - 1.1%
- Asian/Pacific Islanders - 2.1%
- Black - 0.8%
- Hispanic - 60.3%
- White - 34.5%
- Multiracial - 1.2%

71.6% of the students were eligible for free or reduced lunch.

== Athletics ==
The Ontario Tigers are part of the Greater Oregon League. The school colors are cardinal and corn. The following OSAA sanctioned sports are offered:

- Baseball (boys')
- Basketball (boys' and girls')
- Cheerleading (boys' and girls')
- Cross country (boys' and girls')
- Football (boys')
- Golf (boys' and girls')
- Soccer (boys' and girls')
- Softball (girls')
- Tennis (boys' and girls')
- Track (boys' and girls')
- Volleyball (girls')
- Wrestling (boys' and girls')

== Notable alumni ==
- Michael Echanis, Vietnam veteran, Purple Heart recipient, martial arts instructor and author, Class of '69
- A. J. Feeley, former NFL quarterback
- Joe Delgado, Decathlete at the University of Oregon and the University of Louisville
