= Brogan, Oregon =

Unincorporated community in Oregon, US

- Census-designated place
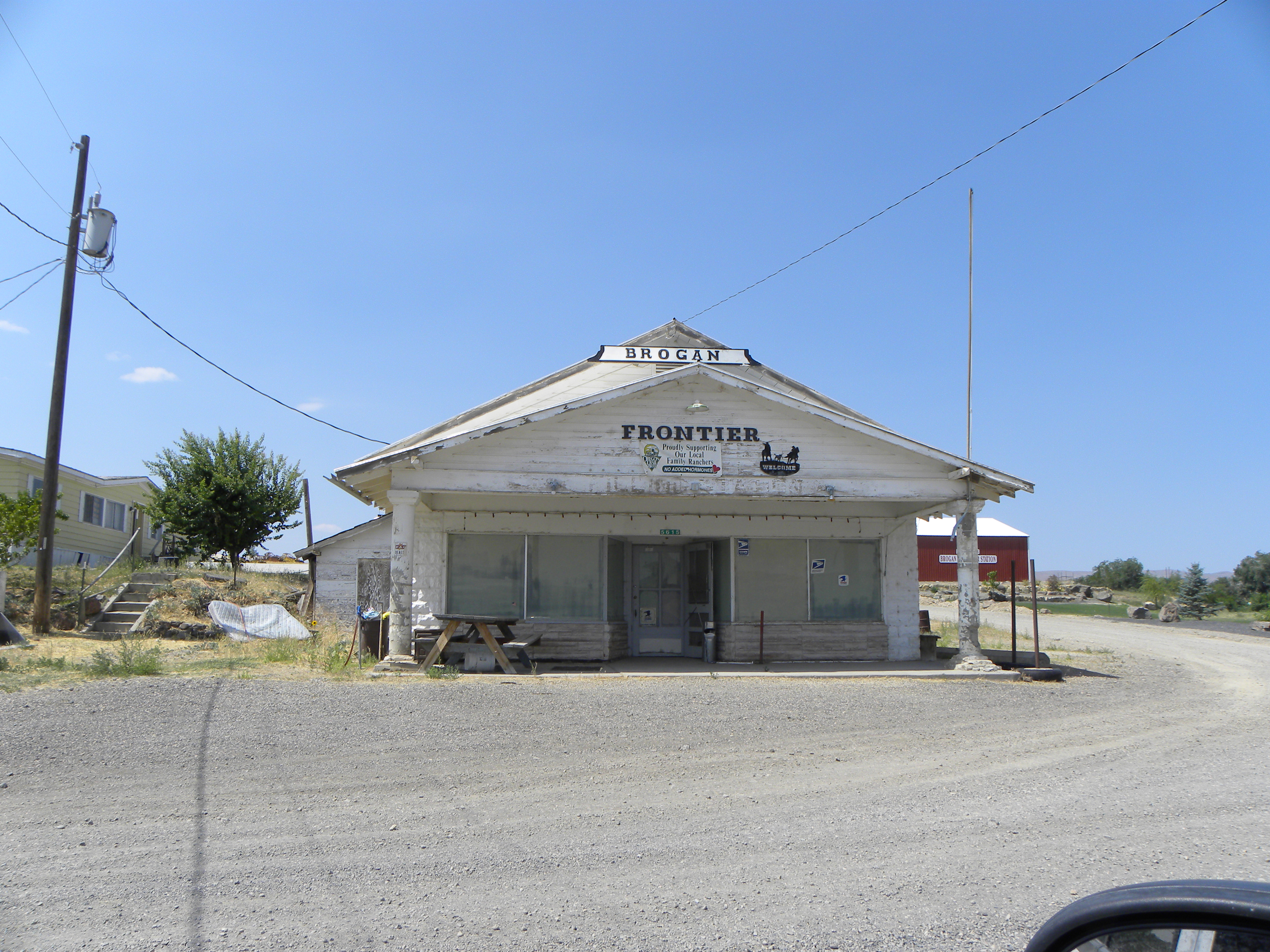
- The Frontier store in Brogan

- Location within Oregon Location within the United States
- Coordinates: 44°14′52″N 117°31′01″W
- Country: United States
- State: Oregon
- County: Malheur
- Established: 1909

Area
  - Total: 2.86 sq mi (7.4 km^{2})
  - Land: 2.86 sq mi (7.4 km^{2})
  - Water: 0.00 sq mi (0 km^{2})
- Elevation: 2,622 ft (799 m)

Population (2020)
  - Total: 97
  - Density: 34/sq mi (13/km^{2})
- Time zone: UTC-7 (Mountain (MST))
  - Summer (DST): UTC-6 (Mountain)
- ZIP Code: 97903
- FIPS code: 41-08600
- GNIS feature ID: 2611716

Brogan is an unincorporated community and Census-designated place (CDP) in Malheur County, Oregon, United States, on U.S. Route 26. As of the 2020 census, it had a population of 97.

== History ==
Brogan was founded by D. M. Brogan in 1909, and when a post office was established in the locality on April 23 that year, it was named for him. Brogan is located on the north end of the now-abandoned Union Pacific Railroad branch line from Vale.

== Geography ==
Brogan is in northern Malheur County in eastern Oregon, in the valley of Willow Creek, a southeast-flowing tributary of the Malheur River and part of the Snake River watershed. U.S. Route 26 passes through the town, leading southeast down the Willow Creek valley 23 miles (37 km) to Vale and west over Eldorado Pass to Unity, 42 miles (68 km) away.

According to the U.S. Census Bureau, the Brogan CDP has an area of 2.86 square miles (7.4 km^{2}), all land. Willow Creek forms the northeast edge of the CDP.

== Demographics ==
Historical population
Census	Pop.	Note	%±
2010	90		—
2020	97		7.8%
U.S. Decennial Census

Brogan is part of the Ontario, OR–ID Micropolitan Statistical Area. At the 2010 census, the population was 90 (47 female and 43 male). The median age was 50.5 years. There were 41 households, five of which included children under age 18.

As of the 2020 census, there were 97 people, 58 housing units, and 16 families in the CDP. There were 88 White people, 6 people from some other race, and 3 people from two or more races. 9 people were Hispanic or Latino.

The ancestry in Brogan was 61% Irish, and 39% Italian.

The median age was 51.9 years old. 48.8% of the population were older than 65, with 24.4% between the ages of 65 and 74, 9.8% between the ages of 75 and 84, and 14.6% older than 85 years old.

0.0% of the population was in poverty, and the median income was not recorded.

== Education ==
Brogan is within the Vale School District 84. This district has grades K-12 and operates Vale High School.

Previously there was a separate Brogan School District 1.
