= Ontario School District 8C =

School district in Oregon, United States

Ontario School District 8C (OSD) is a school district headquartered in Ontario, Oregon.

The district is entirely in Malheur County.

== History ==
Previously students at Four Rivers Community School, a charter school, were allowed to join extracurricular teams at District 8C campuses, but the district ended this in 2016. Hunter Marrow of the Argus Observer reported that this caused massive controversy.

In 2021 Nicole Albisu, the superintendent, reported fatigue in the district's faculty.

In 2022 three board members voted to retain Nicole Albisu as superintendent while two voted against doing so.

== Schools ==
Secondary

- Ontario High School
- Ontario Middle School

Elementary

- Aiken Elementary School
- Alameda Elementary School
- Cairo Elementary School
- Pioneer Elementary School
- May Roberts Elementary School
