= Vale School District 84 =

School district in Oregon, United States

Vale School District 84 is a school district headquartered in Vale, Oregon.

The Vale School District takes students from Vale and Brogan, as well as the unincorporated community of Willowcreek. As of 1979 Vale High School also takes high school students from Juntura.

== History ==
In 1967 there were plans to remodel the former high school.

Formerly there were the Vale Union High School District, Vale Elementary School District, Willowcreek School District, and the Brogan School District. A referendum was held in 1992, with the unofficial vote count pointing to an approval of the merger.

In July 2021 the superintendent opposed mandatory mask mandates imposed by the Oregon state government during the COVID-19 pandemic in Oregon. However in August the district required face coverings and the superintendent expressed concern regarding COVID-19 in the area. The superintendent stated that she would prefer that in-person instruction remain.

In 2023 the district received fiber internet, which made available stronger internet services.

== Schools ==
- Vale High School (9-12)
- Willowcreek Elementary School (1-8)
- Vale Middle School (7-8)
- Vale Elementary School (K-6)
