= Harper, Oregon =

Unincorporated community in the state of Oregon, United States

- Census-designated place
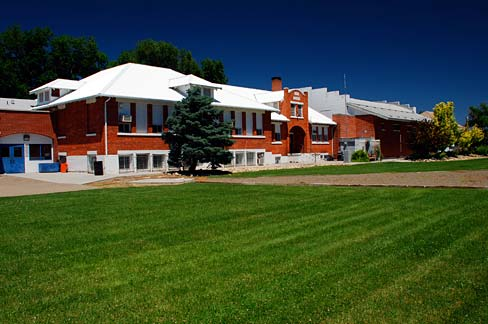
- Harper School

- Location within Oregon Location within the United States
- Coordinates: 43°51′56″N 117°37′20″W
- Country: United States
- State: Oregon
- County: Malheur
- Post office established: 1913

Area
  - Total: 7.00 sq mi (18.14 km^{2})
  - Land: 7.00 sq mi (18.14 km^{2})
  - Water: 0 sq mi (0.00 km^{2})
- Elevation: 2,566 ft (782 m)

Population (2020)
  - Total: 113
  - Density: 16.1/sq mi (6.23/km^{2})
- Time zone: UTC-7 (Mountain (MST))
  - Summer (DST): UTC-6 (Mountain)
- ZIP Code: 97906
- FIPS code: 41-32400
- GNIS feature ID: 2611734

Harper is an unincorporated community and census-designated place (CDP) in Malheur County, Oregon, United States. It has a post office with ZIP code 97906. As of the 2020 census, it had a population of 113.

== Geography ==
Harper is in north-central Malheur County, on the north side of U.S. Route 20 in the valley of the Malheur River, an east-flowing tributary of the Snake River. U.S. 20 leads northeast (downriver) 22 miles (35 km) to Vale and west 91 miles (146 km) to Burns.

According to the U.S. Census Bureau, the Harper CDP has an area of 7.0 square miles (18.1 km^{2}), all land.

== Demographics ==
Historical population
Census	Pop.	Note	%±
2010	109		—
2020	113		3.7%
U.S. Decennial Census

As of the 2020 census, there were 113 people, 62 housing units, and 41 families in the CDP. There were 104 White people, 2 people from some other race, and 7 people from two or more races. 3 people were Hispanic or Latino.

The ancestry in Harper was 50.4% Irish, 13.4% German, 5.9% English, 5.0% French, 1.7% Norwegian, and 0.8% Polish.

The median age was 30.4 years old. A total of 11.8% of the population were older than 65, with 8.4% between the ages of 65 and 74, 2.5% between the ages of 75 and 84, and 0.8% being older than 85.

The median household income was $53,125, with families having $64,375. A total of 4.2% of the population were in poverty, with 6.3% of people between the ages of 18 and 64, and 7.1% of people over 65 being in poverty.

== Climate ==
Harper has a continental cold desert climate (Köppen BWk), with cold, snowy winters and hot, sunny summers.

Climate data for Harper, Oregon
Month	Jan	Feb	Mar	Apr	May	Jun	Jul	Aug	Sep	Oct	Nov	Dec	Year
Record high °F (°C)	59 (15)	68 (20)	80 (27)	89 (32)	100 (38)	105 (41)	108 (42)	106 (41)	101 (38)	90 (32)	77 (25)	63 (17)	108 (42)
Mean daily maximum °F (°C)	37.0 (2.8)	44.3 (6.8)	55.6 (13.1)	63.9 (17.7)	73.2 (22.9)	82.2 (27.9)	92.3 (33.5)	90.8 (32.7)	80.4 (26.9)	65.6 (18.7)	47.9 (8.8)	37.1 (2.8)	64.2 (17.9)
Mean daily minimum °F (°C)	20.1 (−6.6)	23.5 (−4.7)	30.5 (−0.8)	35.4 (1.9)	43.1 (6.2)	50.1 (10.1)	56.2 (13.4)	54.0 (12.2)	45.0 (7.2)	35.1 (1.7)	26.4 (−3.1)	19.4 (−7.0)	36.6 (2.6)
Record low °F (°C)	−14 (−26)	−18 (−28)	−4 (−20)	11 (−12)	20 (−7)	28 (−2)	33 (1)	25 (−4)	21 (−6)	7 (−14)	−6 (−21)	−28 (−33)	−28 (−33)
Average precipitation inches (mm)	1.18 (30)	0.98 (25)	1.29 (33)	0.71 (18)	0.75 (19)	0.75 (19)	0.20 (5.1)	0.28 (7.1)	0.31 (7.9)	0.55 (14)	0.75 (19)	1.30 (33)	9.05 (230)
Average snowfall inches (cm)	4.3 (11)	1.9 (4.8)	0.5 (1.3)	0 (0)	0 (0)	0 (0)	0 (0)	0 (0)	0 (0)	0 (0)	0.8 (2.0)	7.2 (18)	14.7 (37)
Source 1:
Source 2:

== Transportation ==
In the 21st century, Harper is a stop on the Eastern POINT intercity bus line between Bend and Ontario. It makes one stop per day in each direction.

== Education ==
It is in the Harper School District 66.
