= Ironside, Oregon =

Unincorporated community in the state of Oregon, United States

- Unincorporated community
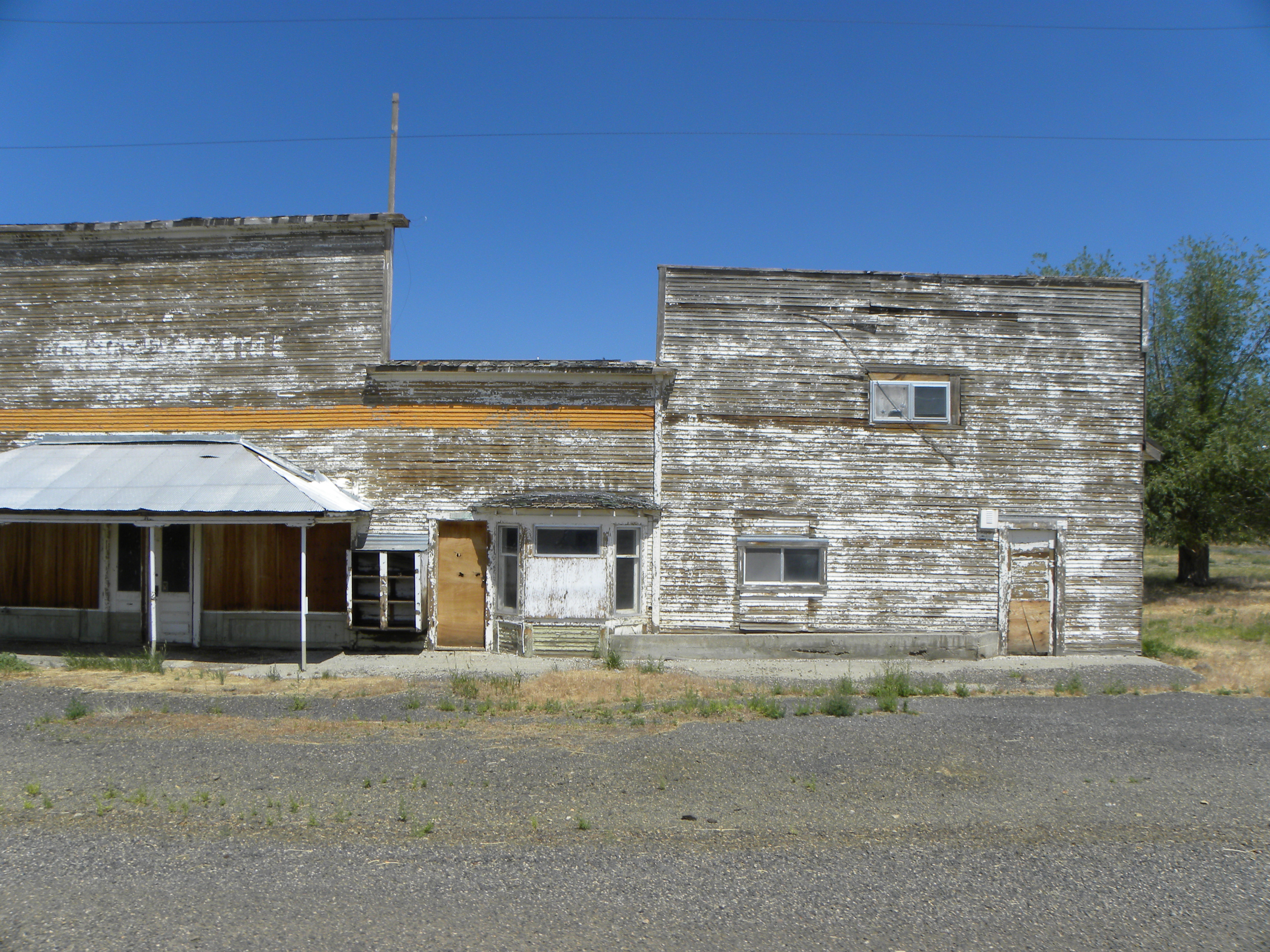
- Abandoned building in Ironside

- Location within Oregon Location within the United States
- Coordinates: 44°19′28″N 117°56′41″W
- Country: United States
- State: Oregon
- County: Malheur
- Elevation: 3,783 ft (1,153 m)
- Time zone: UTC−07:00 (Mountain (MST))
  - Summer (DST): UTC−06:00 (MST)
- ZIP Code: 97908
- Area code: 541
- GNIS feature ID: 1136412

Ironside is an unincorporated community in Malheur County, Oregon, United States. The community is 46 miles (74 km) northwest of Vale along U.S. Route 26. Ironside has a post office with ZIP Code 97908.

== Climate ==
According to the Köppen Climate Classification system, Ironside has a semi-arid climate, abbreviated "BSk" on climate maps.
