= Malheur County, Oregon =

County in Oregon, United States

- County
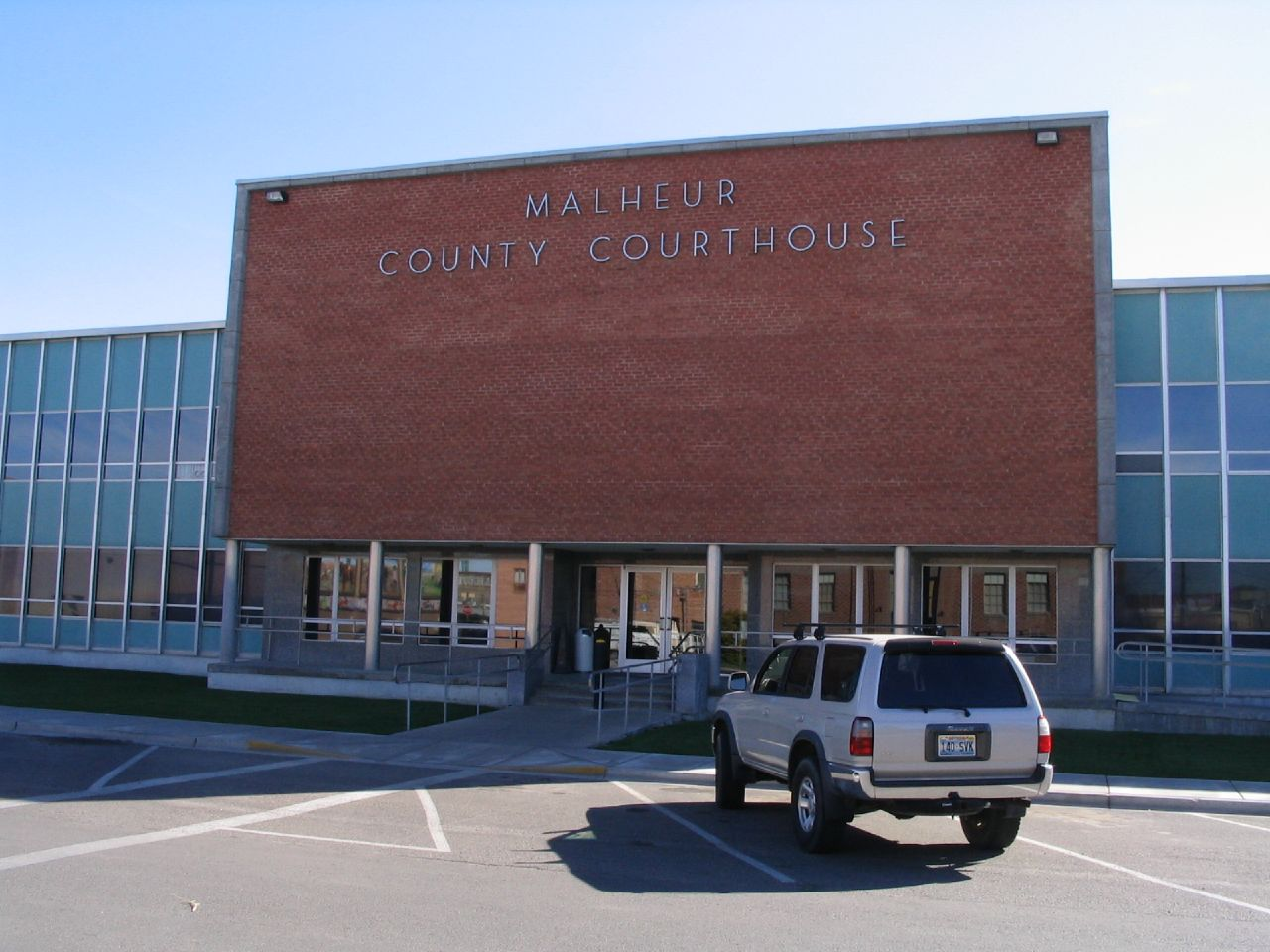
- Malheur County Courthouse in Vale

- Location within the U.S. state of Oregon
- Coordinates: 43°13′N 117°38′W
- Country: United States
- State: Oregon
- Founded: February 17, 1887
- Named for: Malheur River
- Seat: Vale
- Largest city: Ontario

Government
  - County Judge: Dan Joyce

Area
  - Total: 9,930 sq mi (25,700 km^{2})
  - Land: 9,888 sq mi (25,610 km^{2})
  - Water: 42 sq mi (110 km^{2}) 0.4%

Population (2020)
  - Total: 31,571
  - Estimate (2025): 32,261 ▲
  - Density: 3.193/sq mi (1.233/km^{2})

Time zones
- Most of the county: UTC−07:00
  - Summer (DST): UTC-06:00 (MDT)
- Southern fifth: UTC−08:00
  - Summer (DST): UTC−07:00 (PDT)
- Congressional district: 2nd
- Website: www.malheurco.org

Malheur County (/mælˈhɪər/, French pronunciation: [ma.lœʁ]) is one of the 36 counties in the U.S. state of Oregon. As of the 2020 census, the population was 31,571. Its county seat is Vale, and its largest city is Ontario. The county was named after the Malheur River, which runs through the county. The word "malheur" is French for misfortune or tragedy. Malheur County is included in the Ontario, Oregon Micropolitan Statistical Area, which is also included in the Boise Combined Statistical Area. It is included in the eight-county definition of Eastern Oregon.

== History ==
Malheur County was created February 17, 1887, from the southern territory of Baker County. It was first settled by miners and stockmen in the early 1860s. The discovery of gold in 1863 attracted further development, including settlements and ranches. Basques settled in the region in the 1890s and were mainly engaged in sheep raising.

== Geography ==
According to the United States Census Bureau, the county has a total area of 9,930 square miles (25,700 km^{2}), of which 9,888 square miles (25,610 km^{2}) is land and 42 square miles (110 km^{2}), comprising 0.4%, is water. It is the second-largest county in Oregon by area and the only county in Oregon in the Mountain Time Zone.

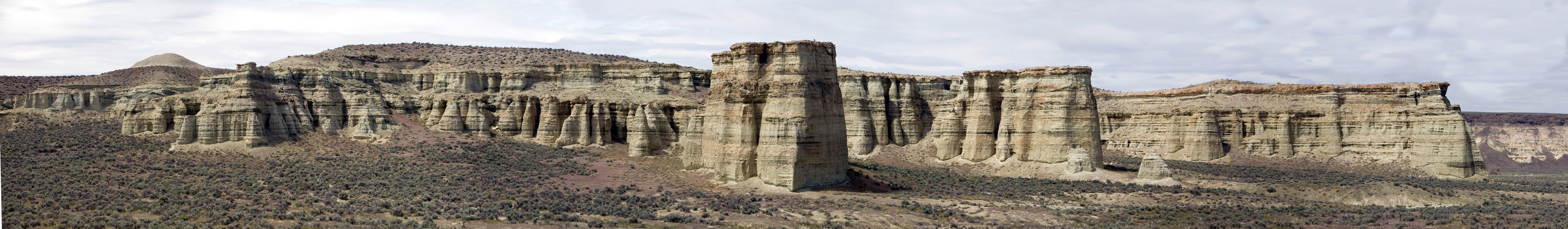
Pillars of Rome, from US 95 near Rome

=== Adjacent counties ===
- Grant County - northwest/Pacific Time Border
- Baker County - north/Pacific Time Border
- Washington County, Idaho - northeast
- Payette County, Idaho - east
- Canyon County, Idaho - east
- Owyhee County, Idaho - east
- Humboldt County, Nevada - south
- Harney County - west/Pacific Time Border

=== National protected areas ===
- Deer Flat National Wildlife Refuge (part)
- Malheur National Forest (part)
- Whitman National Forest (part)

=== Highways ===
- I-84
- US 20
- US 26
- US 30
- US 30 Bus.
- US 95
- OR 52
- OR 78
- OR 201

=== Railroads ===
The main railroad in Malheur County is the Oregon Eastern Railroad. This line goes from Ontario to the Celatom Plant in Vale. This railroad is all that remains of the Wyoming Colorado Railroad, a short line between Colorado, Wyoming and Oregon.

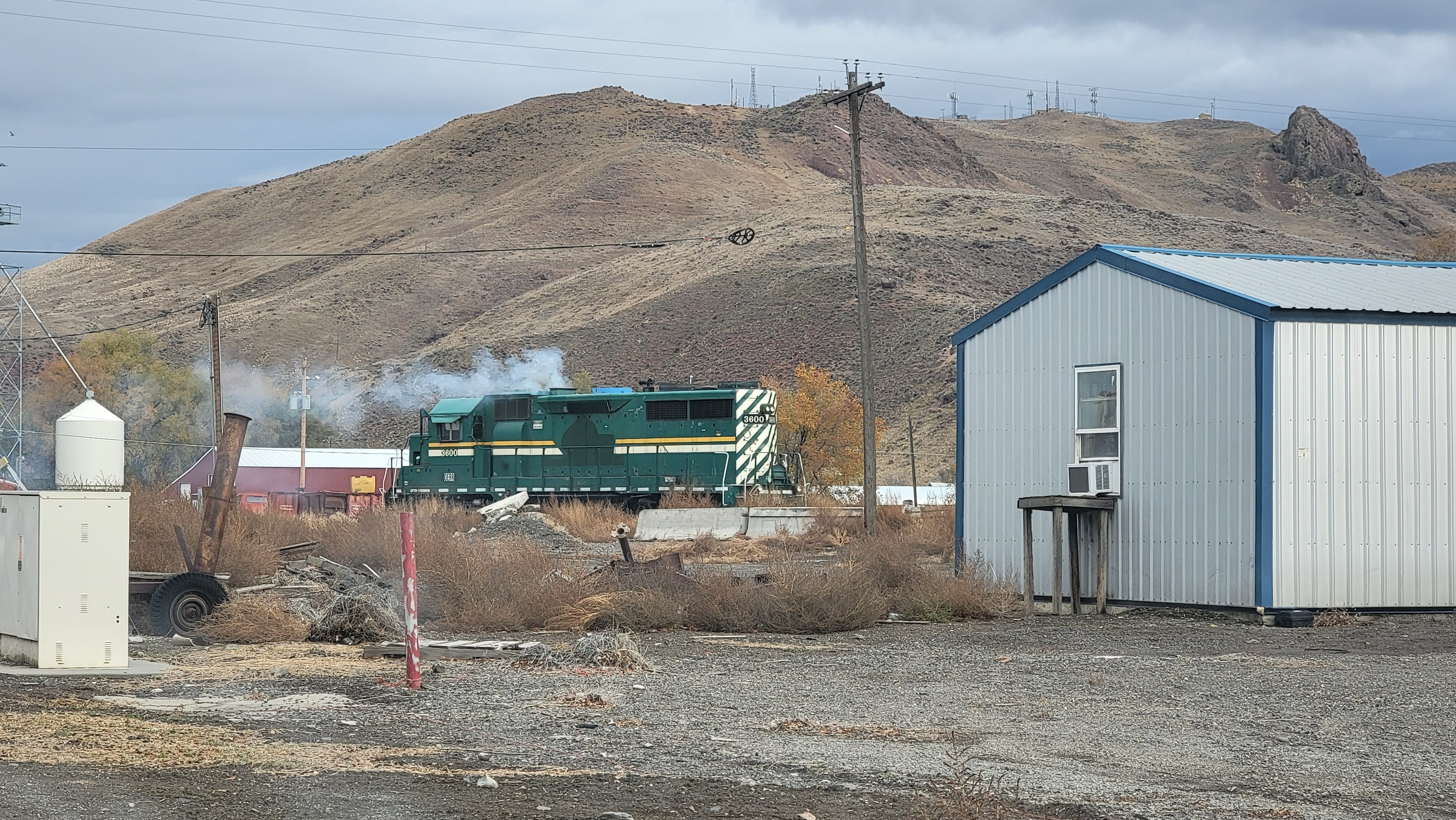
OERR locomotive at Vale

=== Time zones ===
Map of Malheur County

Most of Malheur County (shown in purple) is in the Mountain Time Zone; a small portion in the southern part of the county is in the Pacific Time Zone along with the rest of the state of Oregon and neighboring Nevada.

As with many cities, Malheur County's cities had functioned with both city time and railroad time. This changed by order of the Interstate Commerce Commission on May, 13th 1923 with cities adopting train time. Malheur County is still one of the few counties in the United States with two time zones. Most of the county is in the Mountain Time Zone, but a small portion in the south is in the Pacific Time Zone, indicative of that area's proximity to its main service town, Winnemucca, Nevada.

== Demographics ==
Historical population
Census	Pop.	Note	%±
1890	2,601		—
1900	4,203		61.6%
1910	8,601		104.6%
1920	10,907		26.8%
1930	11,269		3.3%
1940	19,767		75.4%
1950	23,223		17.5%
1960	22,764		−2.0%
1970	23,169		1.8%
1980	26,896		16.1%
1990	26,038		−3.2%
2000	31,615		21.4%
2010	31,313		−1.0%
2020	31,571		0.8%
2025 (est.)	32,261	▲	2.2%
U.S. Decennial Census; 1790–1960 1900–1990; 1990–2000 2010–2020

=== 2020 census ===
Malheur County, Oregon – Racial and ethnic composition Note: the US Census treats Hispanic/Latino as an ethnic category. This table excludes Latinos from the racial categories and assigns them to a separate category. Hispanics/Latinos may be of any race.
Race / Ethnicity (NH = Non-Hispanic)	Pop 1980	Pop 1990	Pop 2000	Pop 2010	Pop 2020	% 1980	% 1990	% 2000	% 2010	% 2020
White alone (NH)	21,933	19,839	21,752	19,906	18,975	81.55%	76.19%	68.80%	63.57%	60.10%
Black or African American alone (NH)	75	63	369	331	447	0.28%	0.24%	1.17%	1.06%	1.42%
Native American or Alaska Native alone (NH)	134	177	273	235	295	0.50%	0.68%	0.86%	0.75%	0.93%
Asian alone (NH)	824	783	608	511	385	3.06%	3.01%	1.92%	1.63%	1.22%
Native Hawaiian or Pacific Islander alone (NH)	x	x	18	12	40	x	x	0.06%	0.04%	0.13%
Other race alone (NH)	129	21	37	21	115	0.48%	0.08%	0.12%	0.07%	0.36%
Mixed race or Multiracial (NH)	x	x	459	430	994	x	x	1.45%	1.37%	3.15%
Hispanic or Latino (any race)	3,801	5,155	8,099	9,867	10,320	14.13%	19.80%	25.62%	31.51%	32.69%
Total	26,896	26,038	31,615	31,313	31,571	100.00%	100.00%	100.00%	100.00%	100.00%

=== American Community Survey 2025 data ===
The United States Census Bureau estimated that in 2025, Malheur County’s population was 32.120. It was also estimated that the county's population was 51,00% Non-Hispanic White, 35,30% Hispanic or Latino, 3,50% Non-Hispanic Black, 2,50% Asian, 2,00% Native American, 0,70% Pacific Islander, and 5,00% Multiracial.

Total	Population	Percentage
Non-Hispanic White	16.381	51,00%
Hispanic or Latino	11.338	35,30%
Non-Hispanic Black	1.124	3,50%
Asian	803	2,50%
Native American	642	2,00%
Pacific Islander	225	0,70%
Non-Hispanic Multiracial	1.606	5,00%

As of the 2020 census, the county had a population of 31,571. Of the residents, 24.5% were under the age of 18 and 17.7% were 65 years of age or older; the median age was 38.0 years. For every 100 females there were 119.1 males, and for every 100 females age 18 and over there were 124.6 males. 41.1% of residents lived in urban areas and 58.9% lived in rural areas.

The racial makeup of the county was 68.5% White, 1.5% Black or African American, 1.7% American Indian and Alaska Native, 1.3% Asian, 0.2% Native Hawaiian and Pacific Islander, 16.6% from some other race, and 10.3% from two or more races. Hispanic or Latino residents of any race comprised 32.7% of the population.

There were 10,505 households in the county, of which 33.3% had children under the age of 18 living with them and 25.4% had a female householder with no spouse or partner present. About 26.8% of all households were made up of individuals and 13.2% had someone living alone who was 65 years of age or older.

There were 11,615 housing units, of which 9.6% were vacant. Among occupied housing units, 61.2% were owner-occupied and 38.8% were renter-occupied. The homeowner vacancy rate was 1.5% and the rental vacancy rate was 5.7%.

=== 2010 census ===
As of the 2010 census, there were 31,313 people, 10,411 households, and 7,149 families living in the county. The population density was 3.2 inhabitants per square mile (1.2/km^{2}). There were 11,692 housing units at an average density of 1.2 units per square mile (0.46 units/km^{2}). The racial makeup of the county was 77.5% white, 1.7% Asian, 1.2% American Indian, 1.2% black or African American, 0.1% Pacific islander, 15.5% from other races, and 2.9% from two or more races. Those of Hispanic or Latino origin made up 31.5% of the population. In terms of ancestry, 16.2% were German, 11.9% were English, 10.3% were Irish, and 9.9% were American.

Of the 10,411 households, 34.8% had children under the age of 18 living with them, 51.6% were married couples living together, 11.8% had a female householder with no husband present, 31.3% were non-families, and 26.0% of all households were made up of individuals. The average household size was 2.69 and the average family size was 3.24. The median age was 36.2 years.

The median income for a household in the county was $39,144 and the median income for a family was $46,136. Males had a median income of $33,234 versus $27,883 for females. The per capita income for the county was $16,335. About 15.2% of families and 22.7% of the population were below the poverty line, including 27.1% of those under age 18 and 10.5% of those age 65 or over.

=== 2000 census ===
As of the 2000 census, there were 31,615 people, 10,221 households, and 7,348 families living in the county. The population density was 3 people per square mile (1.2 people/km^{2}). There were 11,233 housing units at an average density of 1 units per square mile (0.39/km^{2}). The racial makeup of the county was:

- 75.78% White
- 1.22% Black or African American
- 1.02% Native American
- 1.96% Asian
- 0.08% Pacific Islander
- 17.38% from other races
- 2.56% from two or more races

25.62% of the population were Hispanic or Latino of any race. 14.2% were of German, 10.5% English, 8.4% American and 6.9% Irish ancestry. 79.4% spoke English and 19.4% spoke Spanish as their first language.

There were 10,221 households, out of which 36.20% had children under the age of 18 living with them, 57.30% were married couples living together, 10.40% had a female householder with no husband present, and 28.10% were non-families. 23.70% of all households were made up of individuals, and 12.00% had someone living alone who was 65 years of age or older. The average household size was 2.77 and the average family size was 3.28.

In the county, the population was spread out, with 27.60% under the age of 18, 10.60% from 18 to 24, 27.20% from 25 to 44, 21.00% from 45 to 64, and 13.70% who were 65 years of age or older. The median age was 34 years. For every 100 females, there were 116.00 males. For every 100 females age 18 and over, there were 121.20 males.

The median income for a household in the county was $30,241, and the median income for a family was $35,672. Males had a median income of $25,489 versus $21,764 for females. The per capita income for the county was $13,895. About 14.60% of families and 18.60% of the population were below the poverty line, including 25.80% of those under age 18 and 11.60% of those age 65 or over.

Malheur County is the poorest county in Oregon. As of 2008, 21% of its residents live in poverty.

== Politics ==
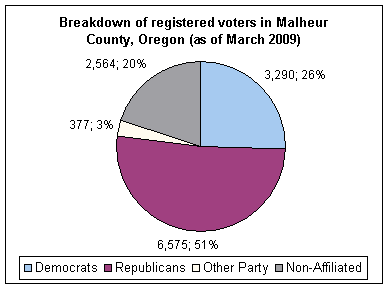

Like most counties in eastern Oregon, the majority of registered voters who are part of a political party in Malheur County are members of the Republican Party. In the 2008 presidential election, 69.10% of Malheur County voters voted for Republican John McCain, while 28.47% voted for Democrat Barack Obama and 2.42% of voters voted for a third-party candidate. These statistics do not include write-in votes. These numbers show a small shift towards the Democratic candidate when compared to the 2004 presidential election, in which 74.9% of Malheur Country voters voted for George W. Bush, while 23.8% voted for John Kerry, and 1.3% of voters either voted for a third-party candidate or wrote in a candidate.

Malheur County is one of the dominant Republican counties in Oregon when it comes to presidential elections. In 1964, it was one of only two counties in Oregon to give the majority of its vote to Barry Goldwater and has favored the Republican candidate for decades. The last Democratic candidate to carry the county was Franklin D. Roosevelt in 1940, and only by a margin of 29 votes. Further every Republican candidate since 1996 has received more than 60% of the county's vote. Malheur County is also one of the most reliably Republican counties in state elections, for example in the 1998 gubernatorial election it was the only county to vote for Bill Sizemore instead of John Kitzhaber, and in the 1998 U.S. Senate election, it was the only county to vote for state senator John Lim over Ron Wyden.

As part of Oregon's 2nd congressional district it has been represented by Republican Cliff Bentz since 2021. In the Oregon Legislature, Malheur County is within Oregon's 30th Senate district, represented by Republican Lynn Findley. It's also within the 60th District in the Oregon House, which is represented by Republican Mark Owens.

United States presidential election results for Malheur County, Oregon
Year	Republican		Democratic		Third party(ies)	
Year	No.	%	No.	%	No.	%
1904	799	63.82%	280	22.36%	173	13.82%
1908	800	54.42%	543	36.94%	127	8.64%
1912	648	33.77%	656	34.18%	615	32.05%
1916	1,682	42.38%	1,937	48.80%	350	8.82%
1920	2,352	64.97%	1,075	29.70%	193	5.33%
1924	1,671	51.94%	828	25.74%	718	22.32%
1928	2,164	67.35%	1,016	31.62%	33	1.03%
1932	1,589	42.33%	2,025	53.94%	140	3.73%
1936	1,385	31.41%	2,630	59.64%	395	8.96%
1940	2,929	49.40%	2,958	49.89%	42	0.71%
1944	2,797	55.08%	2,234	43.99%	47	0.93%
1948	3,265	55.36%	2,499	42.37%	134	2.27%
1952	5,414	70.45%	2,245	29.21%	26	0.34%
1956	4,981	61.25%	3,151	38.75%	0	0.00%
1960	5,043	59.86%	3,381	40.14%	0	0.00%
1964	4,177	52.32%	3,798	47.58%	8	0.10%
1968	5,447	65.16%	2,021	24.17%	892	10.67%
1972	5,908	67.36%	1,870	21.32%	993	11.32%
1976	5,682	59.13%	3,507	36.49%	421	4.38%
1980	7,705	67.80%	2,937	25.84%	722	6.35%
1984	8,441	76.24%	2,611	23.58%	19	0.17%
1988	6,285	66.56%	2,965	31.40%	193	2.04%
1992	5,374	50.40%	2,539	23.81%	2,750	25.79%
1996	6,045	61.11%	2,827	28.58%	1,020	10.31%
2000	7,624	73.28%	2,336	22.45%	444	4.27%
2004	8,123	74.89%	2,577	23.76%	146	1.35%
2008	7,157	68.60%	2,949	28.27%	327	3.13%
2012	6,851	68.81%	2,759	27.71%	346	3.48%
2016	7,194	68.94%	2,246	21.52%	995	9.54%
2020	8,187	69.36%	3,260	27.62%	357	3.02%
2024	7,710	70.44%	2,884	26.35%	351	3.21%

== Economy ==
The county is 94% rangeland, with the Bureau of Land Management controlling 72% of the land. Irrigated fields in the county's northeast corner, known as Western Treasure Valley, are the center of intensive and diversified farming. Malheur County's economy also depends on tourism.

The county's two largest employers are Heinz of Ontario, a potato processor branded as Ore-Ida, and the Snake River Correctional Institution, five miles northwest of Ontario.

== Communities ==
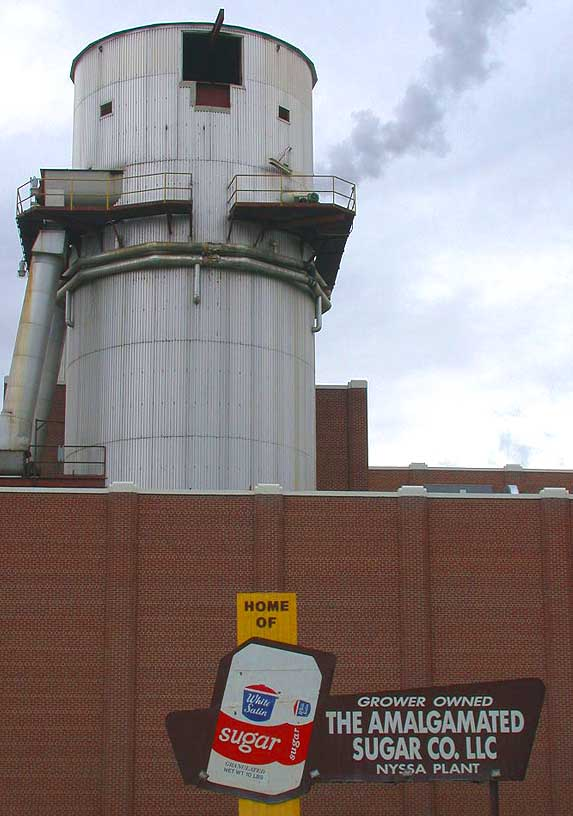
A sugar beet plant of the Amalgamated Sugar Company in Nyssa

=== Cities ===
- Adrian
- Jordan Valley
- Nyssa
- Ontario
- Vale (county seat)

=== Census-designated places ===
- Annex
- Brogan
- Harper
- Juntura

=== Unincorporated communities ===
- Arock
- Basque
- Beulah
- Burns Junction
- Cairo
- Crowley
- Danner
- Harper
- Ironside
- Jamieson
- McDermitt, Nevada-Oregon
- Owyhee
- Riverside
- Rockville
- Rome
- Westfall
- Willowcreek

=== Ghost towns ===
- Inskip Station
- Jonesboro
- Leslie Gulch
- Malheur City
- Payette Junction
- Wildhorse

== Education ==
=== K-12 schools ===
School districts include:

- Adrian School District 61
- Annex School District 29
  - As of 1998 students who graduate from Annex attend Weiser High School, of the Weiser School District, in Weiser, Idaho.
- Arock School District 81
- Burnt River School District 30J
- Harper School District 66
- Huntington School District 16J
- Jordan Valley School District 3
- Juntura School District 12 (elementary only)
- McDermitt School District 51 (a.k.a. Malheur County School District #51) - A district with no employees, it sends all of its students to McDermitt Combined School in McDermitt, Nevada and Oregon, a school operated by the Humboldt County School District.
- Nyssa School District 26
- Ontario School District 8
- Vale School District 84

There is a charter school in Ontario, Four Rivers Community School (4RCC).

Private schools, both in Ontario, include:

- Treasure Valley Christian School
- St. Peter Catholic School of the Roman Catholic Diocese of Baker

Eldorado School, the first school in the county, was established in 1869.

Previously Crane Union High School in Harney County served sections of Malheur County. As of 2009 Juntura area students could choose from multiple high schools, including Crane, Harper, Ontario High, and Vale High. Formerly there were the Vale Union High School District, Vale Elementary School District, Willowcreek School District, and the Brogan School District, with the latter three being elementary school districts. A referendum was held in 1992, with the unofficial vote count pointing to an approval of the merger of those four districts into a single K-12 school district.

Previously there was a separate Brogan School District 1, and a Rockville School District 2.

=== Tertiary education ===
Treasure Valley Community College is in Ontario.

A portion of the county is in the TVCC district. The remainder is not in any community college district.

=== Public libraries ===
Vale has the Emma Humphrey Library. Ontario Community Library of the Ontario Library District is in Ontario.

== See also ==
- National Register of Historic Places listings in Malheur County, Oregon
- Malheur Enterprise, local newspaper of public record
