= Vale, Oregon =

- City
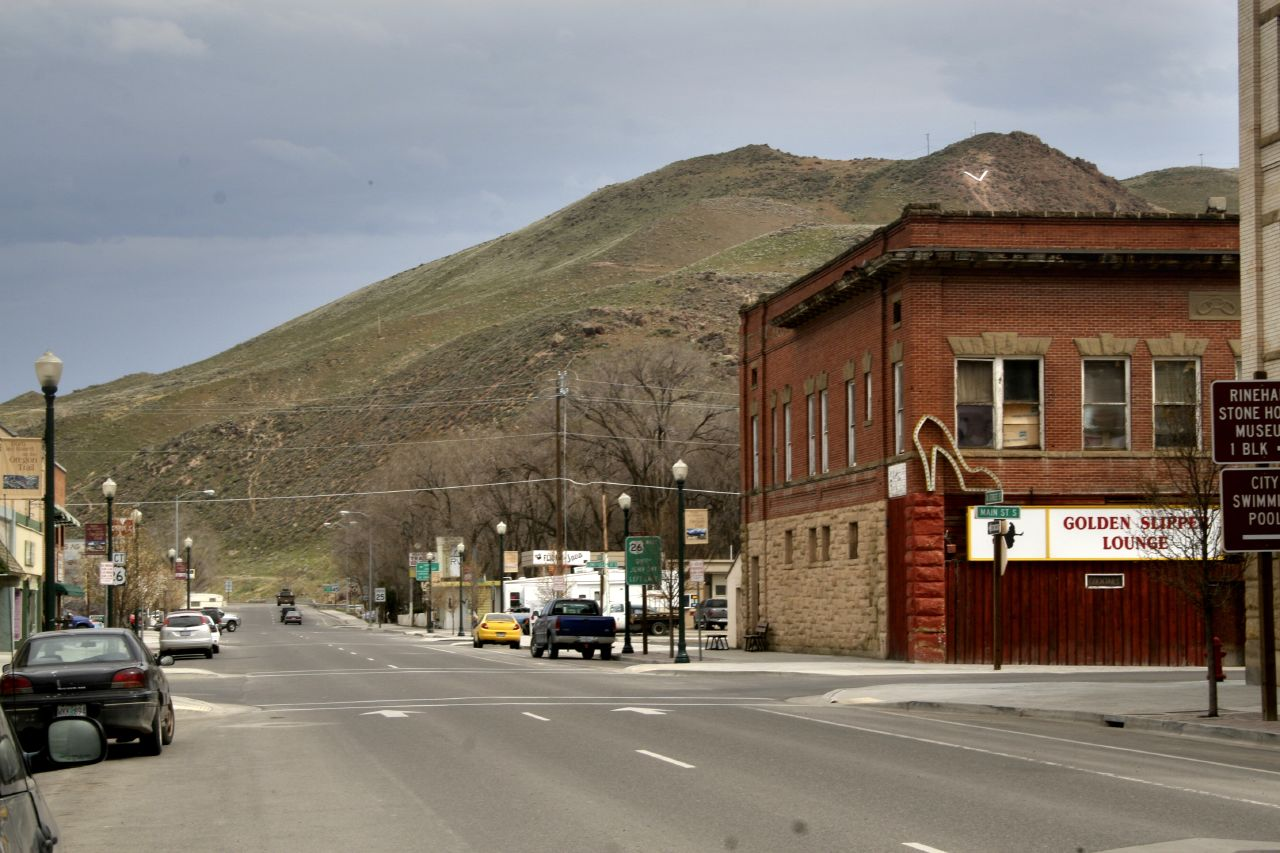
- Downtown Vale
- Motto: Born and raised on the Oregon Trail
- Location in Oregon
- Coordinates: 43°58′59″N 117°14′50″W
- Country: United States
- State: Oregon
- County: Malheur
- Incorporated: 1889

Area
  - Total: 1.14 sq mi (2.94 km^{2})
  - Land: 1.14 sq mi (2.94 km^{2})
  - Water: 0 sq mi (0.00 km^{2})
- Elevation: 2,244 ft (684 m)

Population (2020)
  - Total: 1,894
  - Density: 1,668.3/sq mi (644.14/km^{2})
- Time zone: UTC-7 (Mountain)
  - Summer (DST): UTC-6 (Mountain)
- ZIP code: 97918
- Area code: 541
- FIPS code: 41-76600
- GNIS feature ID: 2412141
- Website: www.cityofvale.com

Vale is a city in and the county seat of Malheur County, Oregon, United States, approximately 12 miles (19 km) west of the Idaho border. It is at the intersection of U.S. Routes 20 and 26, on the Malheur River at its confluence with Bully Creek.

Vale was selected as Malheur's county seat in 1888 in a vote where other candidate communities were Ontario and Jordan Valley. As of the 2020 census, the city had a population of 1,894. Vale is part of the Ontario, OR–ID Micropolitan Statistical Area.

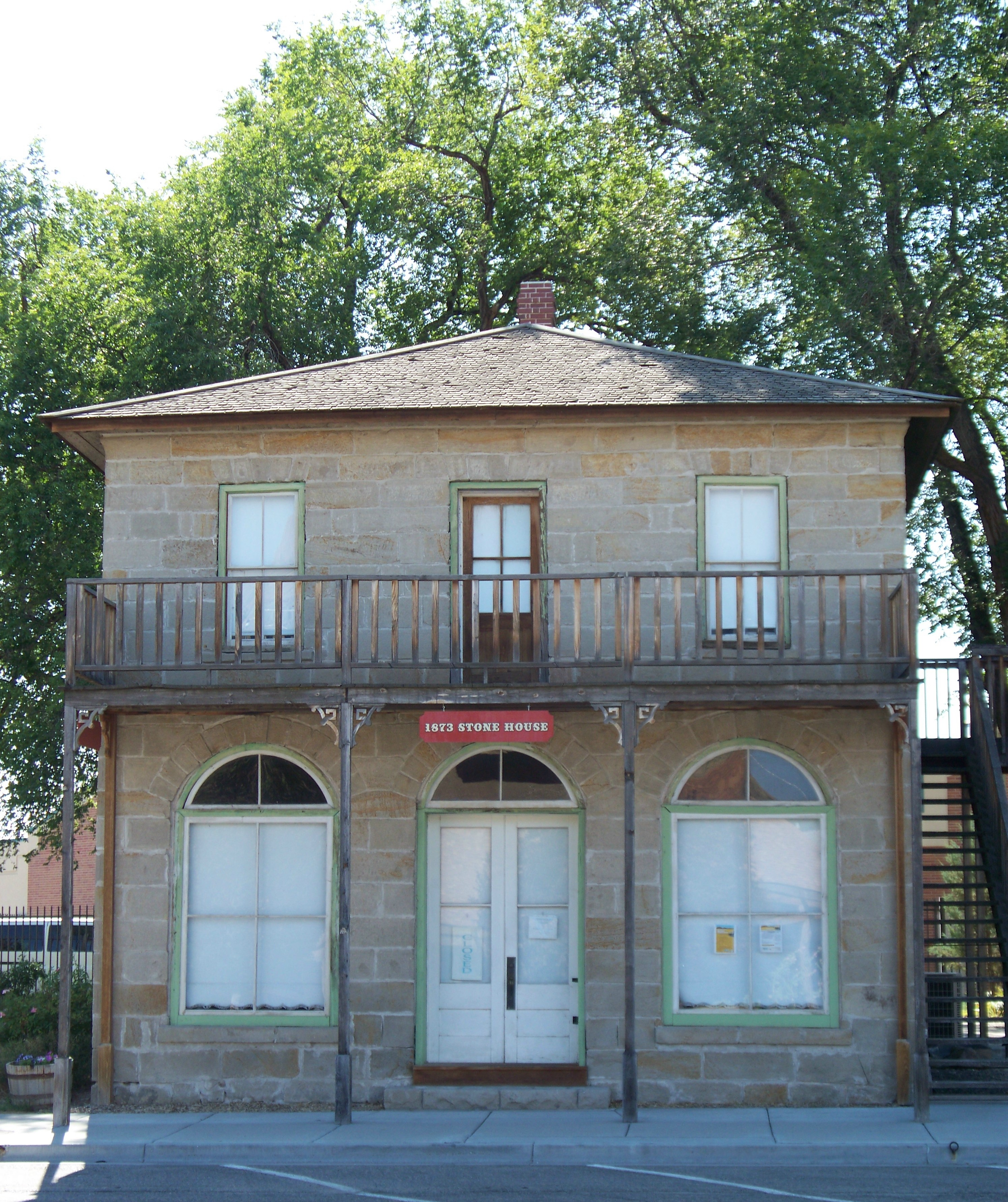
Rinehart Stone House Museum

== History ==
The area where present-day Vale sits was historically home to small groups of Native Americans. The area was also a central gathering place for Paiutes during salmon run season.

The community was the first stop in Oregon along the Oregon Trail. Journals of those who traveled the trail note a trading post in the area as early as 1853, and by 1864, Jonathan Keeney had built a cabin and a barn that he offered for lodging for passing travelers. This cabin was replaced by the Rinehart House in 1872, which still stands today.

The railroad arrived in Vale in 1883, and the town became an important shipping gateway. A post office with the name of Vale was established in the Rinehart House the same year, though the community was not incorporated by the Oregon Legislative Assembly until February 21, 1889. Originally incorporated as the Town of Vale, it became the City of Vale in 1905. In 1887, Vale was named the first Malheur County seat, and a courthouse was constructed.

== Geography ==
Vale is in northeastern Malheur County, in the valley of the Malheur River, where it is joined from the west by Bully Creek and from the north by Willow Creek. The Malheur is an east-flowing tributary of the Snake River. Ontario, the largest city in Malheur County, is 16 miles (26 km) to the east-northeast via U.S. Routes 20 and 26, and Oregon Route 201. US 20 leads west-southwest 113 miles (182 km) to Burns, while US 26 leads west-northwest 114 miles (183 km) to John Day.

According to the U.S. Census Bureau, Vale has a total area of 1.17 square miles (3.03 km^{2}), all land. The city has an elevation of 2,244 feet (684 m) above sea level.

=== Climate ===
Vale has a semi-arid climate (Köppen BSk). July is on average the hottest month and January the coldest. Typically there will be 148.3 nights each winter falling below 32 °F or 0 °C and 6.3 nights falling under 0 °F or −17.8 °C, although the clear skies mean that only 25.2 days do not top freezing and only 101.5 days fail to top 50 °F or 10 °C. During summer, 12.7 days will top 100 °F or 37.8 °C and 61.2 days – including 43 of 62 in July and August – will on average top 90 °F or 32.2 °C. However, the low humidity and clear high-altitude skies mean nights are cool even in summer, with minima rarely above 65 °F or 18.3 °C.

December is the wettest month, when the average precipitation totals about 1.38 inches (35.1 mm), although the wettest month has been May 1998 with 5.57 inches (141.5 mm), whilst zero precipitation has been reported during each month between July and October. Snowfall is rare despite temperatures falling well below freezing between mid-October and mid-April, with a median of only 7.3 inches or 0.19 meters and usually negligible snow on the ground even in January, although during February 1989 a depth of 18 inches or 0.46 meters was reached. The most snow in one month was 16 inches (0.41 m) in January 1975.

Climate data for Vale, Oregon (1971–2000)
Month	Jan	Feb	Mar	Apr	May	Jun	Jul	Aug	Sep	Oct	Nov	Dec	Year
Record high °F (°C)	61 (16)	67 (19)	81 (27)	92 (33)	102 (39)	106 (41)	110 (43)	110 (43)	101 (38)	91 (33)	75 (24)	66 (19)	110 (43)
Mean daily maximum °F (°C)	35.4 (1.9)	44.5 (6.9)	56.8 (13.8)	65.8 (18.8)	75.1 (23.9)	84.4 (29.1)	93.2 (34.0)	91.6 (33.1)	80.4 (26.9)	66.1 (18.9)	47.8 (8.8)	36.5 (2.5)	64.8 (18.2)
Mean daily minimum °F (°C)	18.3 (−7.6)	24.0 (−4.4)	30.2 (−1.0)	35.3 (1.8)	43.9 (6.6)	50.5 (10.3)	55.7 (13.2)	52.7 (11.5)	42.5 (5.8)	32.6 (0.3)	26.0 (−3.3)	18.4 (−7.6)	35.8 (2.1)
Record low °F (°C)	−28 (−33)	−23 (−31)	7 (−14)	14 (−10)	21 (−6)	20 (−7)	36 (2)	30 (−1)	19 (−7)	6 (−14)	−14 (−26)	−27 (−33)	−28 (−33)
Average precipitation inches (mm)	1.22 (31)	0.96 (24)	1.00 (25)	0.85 (22)	1.05 (27)	0.75 (19)	0.47 (12)	0.38 (9.7)	0.52 (13)	0.62 (16)	1.11 (28)	1.35 (34)	10.28 (260.7)
Average snowfall inches (cm)	4.3 (11)	0.6 (1.5)	0.2 (0.51)	0.0 (0.0)	0.0 (0.0)	0.0 (0.0)	0.0 (0.0)	0.0 (0.0)	0.0 (0.0)	0.0 (0.0)	2.1 (5.3)	5.6 (14)	12.8 (32.31)
Average precipitation days (≥ 0.01 inch)	8.1	6.3	6.9	5.3	5.4	4.5	2.4	2.6	3.1	3.7	7.9	8.0	64.2
Average snowy days (≥ 0.1 inch)	2.3	0.5	0.1	0.0	0.0	0.0	0.0	0.0	0.0	0.0	0.9	2.0	5.8
Source: National Oceanic and Atmospheric Administration

== Demographics ==
Historical population
Census	Pop.	Note	%±
1890	131		—
1900	127		−3.1%
1910	992		681.1%
1920	935		−5.7%
1930	922		−1.4%
1940	1,083		17.5%
1950	1,518		40.2%
1960	1,491		−1.8%
1970	1,448		−2.9%
1980	1,558		7.6%
1990	1,491		−4.3%
2000	1,976		32.5%
2010	1,874		−5.2%
2020	1,894		1.1%
Source: U.S. Decennial Census

=== 2020 census ===
As of the 2020 census, Vale had a population of 1,894 and a median age of 36.4 years. 27.5% of residents were under the age of 18 and 17.3% of residents were 65 years of age or older. For every 100 females there were 99.6 males, and for every 100 females age 18 and over there were 93.9 males age 18 and over.

0% of residents lived in urban areas, while 100.0% lived in rural areas.

There were 713 households in Vale, of which 35.1% had children under the age of 18 living in them. Of all households, 42.8% were married-couple households, 20.1% were households with a male householder and no spouse or partner present, and 28.8% were households with a female householder and no spouse or partner present. About 28.9% of all households were made up of individuals and 12.9% had someone living alone who was 65 years of age or older.

There were 769 housing units, of which 7.3% were vacant. Among occupied housing units, 62.7% were owner-occupied and 37.3% were renter-occupied. The homeowner vacancy rate was 1.3% and the rental vacancy rate was 5.3%.

Racial composition as of the 2020 census
Race	Number	Percent
White	1,535	81.0%
Black or African American	9	0.5%
American Indian and Alaska Native	15	0.8%
Asian	10	0.5%
Native Hawaiian and Other Pacific Islander	6	0.3%
Some other race	195	10.3%
Two or more races	124	6.5%
Hispanic or Latino (of any race)	389	20.5%

=== 2010 census ===
As of the census of 2010, there were 1,874 people, 669 households, and 441 families residing in the city. The population density was 1,643.9 inhabitants per square mile (634.7/km^{2}). There were 754 housing units at an average density of 661.4 per square mile (255.4/km^{2}). The racial makeup of the city was 86.7% White, 0.3% African American, 1.3% Native American, 0.4% Asian, 0.3% Pacific Islander, 8.2% from other races, and 2.8% from two or more races. Hispanic or Latino of any race were 23.4% of the population.

There were 669 households, of which 38.1% had children under the age of 18 living with them, 47.8% were married couples living together, 12.0% had a female householder with no husband present, 6.1% had a male householder with no wife present, and 34.1% were non-families. 28.7% of all households were made up of individuals, and 13.9% had someone living alone who was 65 years of age or older. The average household size was 2.64 and the average family size was 3.27.

The median age in the city was 33.4 years. About 29% of residents were under the age of 18; 10.4% were between the ages of 18 and 24; 24.8% were from 25 to 44; 19.7% were from 45 to 64; and 16.4% were 65 years of age or older. The gender makeup of the city was 50.5% male and 49.5% female.

=== 2000 census ===
As of the 2000 census, the median income for a household in the city was $27,065, and the median income for a family was $33,355. Males had a median income of $27,176 versus $22,500 for females. The per capita income for the city was $11,943. About 20% of the population and 15.6 percent of families had incomes below the poverty line. Out of the total population, 27.8% of those under the age of 18 and 12.2% of those 65 and older were living below the poverty line.

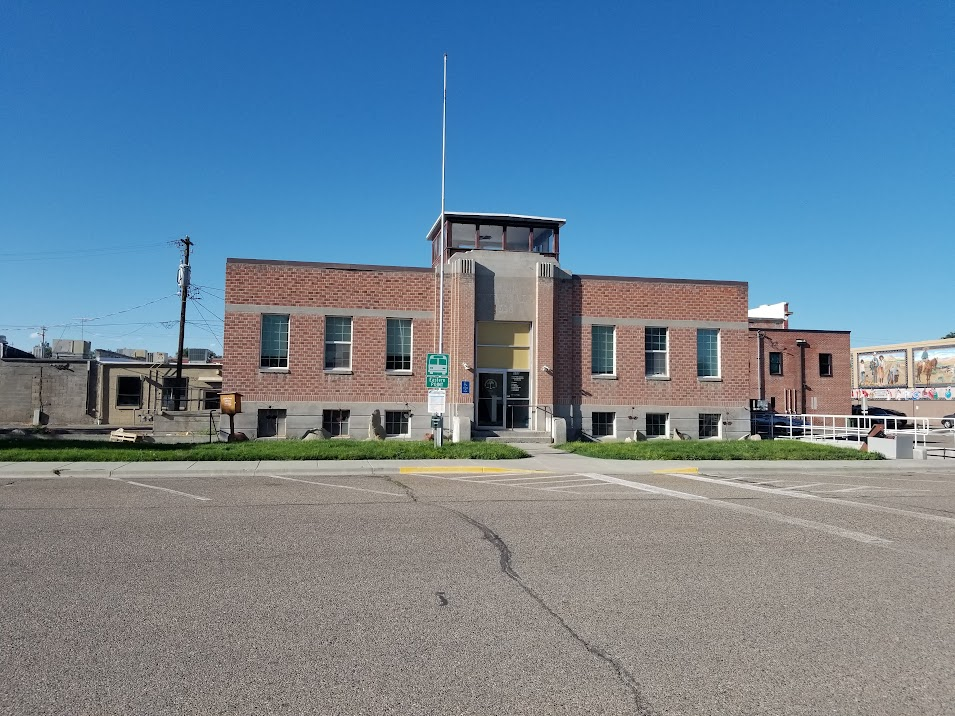
Old Vale City Hall

== Transportation ==
In the 21st century, Vale is a stop on the Eastern POINT intercity bus line between Bend and Ontario. It makes one stop per day in each direction.

- Miller Memorial Airpark

== Education ==
Vale is within the Vale School District 84. It has grades K-12.

== See also ==
- Bully Creek Reservoir
