= Elliott Cutoff =

Covered wagon road in Oregon, United States

Settler Elijah Elliott, namesake of the Elliott Cutoff
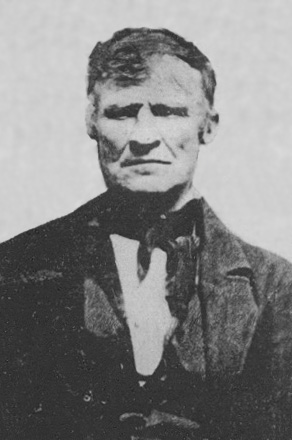

Personal details
- Born: April 6 or 7, 1817 Fleming County, Kentucky, U.S.
- Died: April 8, 1856 Pleasant Hill, Oregon
- Spouse: Mary Jane "Polly" McCall
- Occupation: Farmer, Election Judge, Wagon Train Guide

The Elliott Cutoff was a covered wagon road that branched off the Oregon Trail at the Malheur River at the site that became Vale, Oregon, United States. The first portion of the road was originally known as the Meek Cutoff after Stephen Meek, a former trapper who led over 1,000 emigrants into the Harney Basin in 1845. There were considerable difficulties for the 1845 train, and after reaching a hill known as Wagontire, the people left Meek and split into groups. They turned north at the Deschutes River and finally returned to the traditional Oregon Trail near The Dalles.

In 1853 another group left the Oregon Trail at Vale. This emigration was led by Elijah Elliott who followed, with some exceptions, Meek's 1845 route. But instead of turning north at the Deschutes River, Elliott turned south and traveled up the Deschutes about 30 miles where a newly built trail had been prepared for the wagon train. This new road crossed the Cascades near Willamette Pass.

== History ==
As emigrants came to Oregon, the majority traveled on the Oregon Trail to the Portland area. It was not practical to journey too far south once arriving in Western Oregon, so most emigrants settled in northwestern Oregon.

In the early 1850s, residents of the Upper Willamette Valley attempted to attract more emigrants to Central Oregon. One of the suggestions was to build a road over the Cascades that would bring emigrants directly to the upper valley. This road would save emigrants over 130 miles (210 km), avoid the difficult crossing at the mouth of the Deschutes and the difficult choice of reaching Portland by boat or by traveling over the Barlow Road.

Finding a way over the Cascades was challenging, and several possibilities were presented but most were deemed impractical. Finally, a survey party was formed to explore the Willamette Pass. It was through this pass the Klamath Indians came to trade with the Kalapuya Indians. The survey party was formed and became known as the Road Viewers. Men who took part in the survey included William Macy, John Diamond, William Tandy, Joseph Meador, Alexander King, Robert Walker, and a J. Clark.

On July 19, 1852, Macy and Diamond made a preliminary trip across the pass. During this trip they decided to climb a prominent peak to help understand the terrain. This peak was named Diamond Peak after John Diamond, who was a pioneer from Eugene. From the peak, they were able to plot a route over the eastern half of the Cascade Range and on to the Deschutes River.

The Road Viewers left the Willamette Valley on August 20, 1852. Once they finished the road survey, they tried to follow the remaining route to Vale, Oregon, where the cutoff was to begin. They continued northeast until they located the ruts of Meek's wagons and followed them not far from the Crooked River until they came to Steen's Ridge. A marker was found carved on a rock that was left in a small cairn on top of Steen's Ridge. The inscription read: "T – 1852." It is believed the rock was carved by William Tandy, one of the Viewers. Although there was never any official statement, it is apparent the Viewers were also looking for the Lost Blue Bucket Mine, a place where some of Meek's emigrants had stumbled onto gold nuggets.

From Steen's Ridge, the Viewers followed Meek's wagon ruts south into the Harney Basin. The ruts led past the northern shores of Harney and Malheur Lakes. It was here the Viewers were attacked by a band they believed were Shoshoni Indians, although this was the territory of the Northern Paiute. The aboriginal attack force included 14 horsemen using guns and 40–50 foot soldiers using bows and arrows. Macy, Clark, and Diamond were wounded by musket balls and four horses were killed by arrows. The Viewers lost their notes, provisions and their geological specimens.

The Viewers fled to the north and eventually came to the Oregon Trail along the Burnt River. A couple of doctors were coming through at that time and were able to assist the wounded men. From here they traveled back to the Willamette Valley via the Oregon Trail and returned home. With their adventure completed they filed a report that was quite optimistic considering the difficulties they encountered. The report devotes only one sentence to the skirmish with Native Americans.

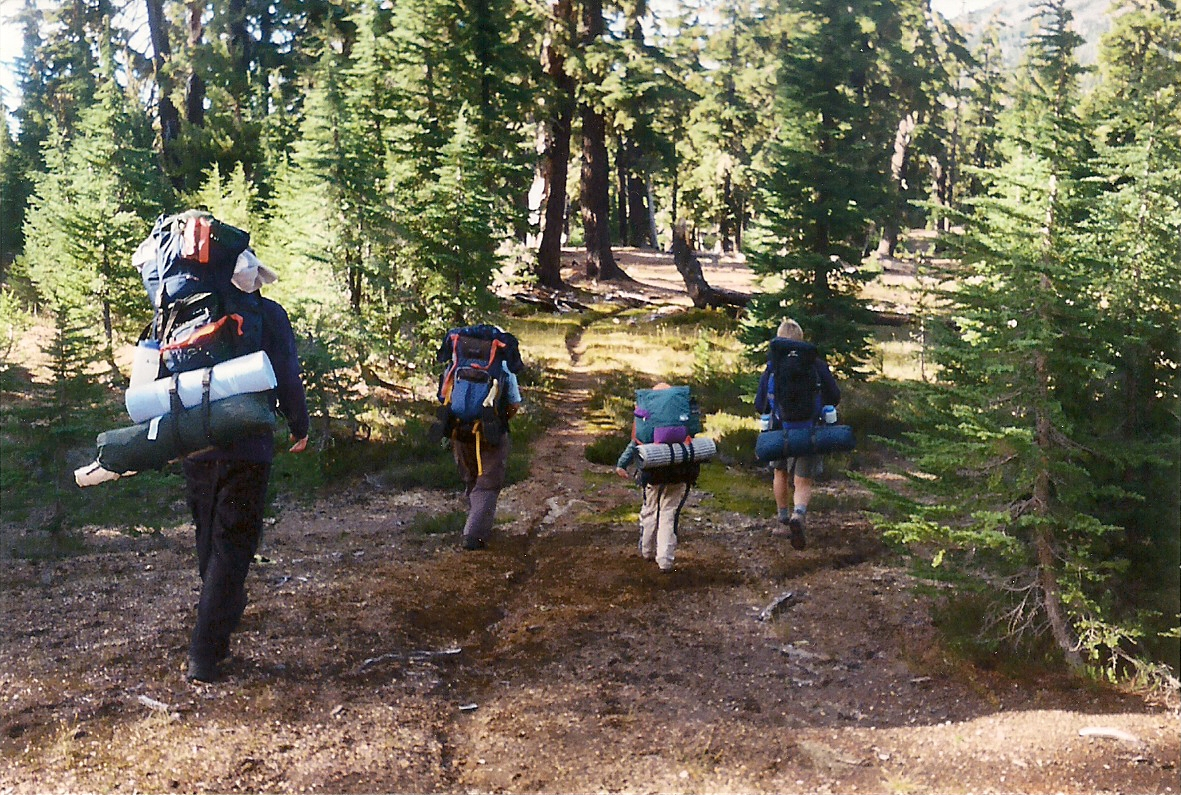
Hikers follow the ruts of Elliott's wagons on the Free Emigrant Road near Diamond Peak in late October, 2003, during the 150th anniversary trek over the summit.

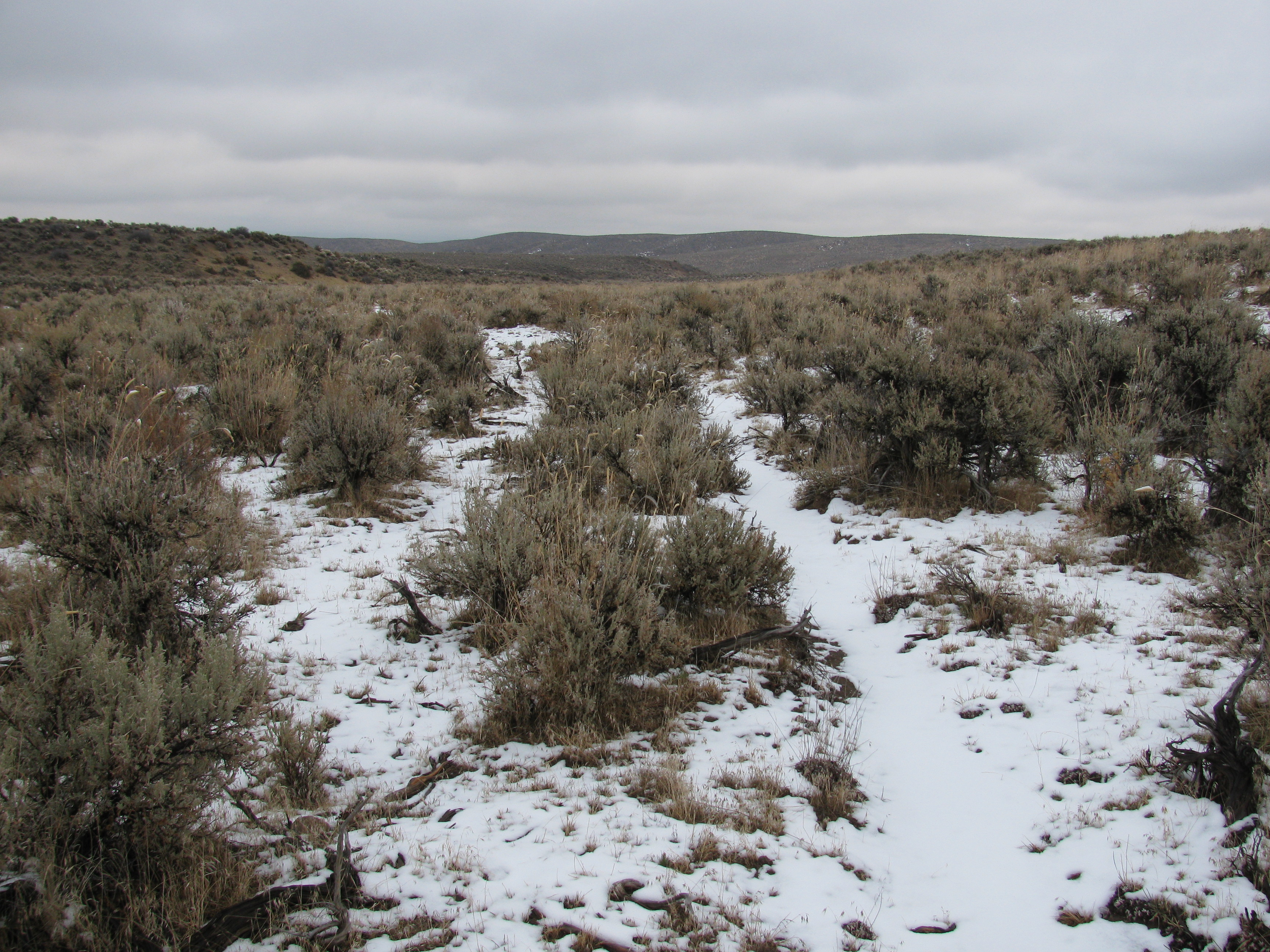
Ruts of Meek's and Elliott's wagons near Westfall, Oregon

=== Free road ===
Because emigrants had to pay tolls in places such as the mouth of the Deschutes River and the Barlow Road, there was a strong feeling among the new road commissioners—William Macy, Thomas Cady, and Asahel Spencer—to make the new road toll free. A call for donations was sent out and once the money was raised, a contract was given to a Dr. Robert Alexander to build the road.

As time went on there were numerous problems with the road construction. R. M. Walker was hired to mark out the road, but there was an unusually heavy snowfall in 1853 and Walker was unable to mark the road near the Cascade crest. Walker returned home without telling anyone, and when the road workers ran out of marks they also went home. Several weeks went by before the work continued. Finally a crew of 10 was sent to finish the road. Construction was made in great haste until they reached a branch of the Deschutes River.

The construction of the Free Emigrant Road was basically a tree-felling operation. Many of the logs were left in the road where the emigrants themselves had to clear them out of the way.

=== 1853 emigration ===
As emigrants were heading west during the summer of 1853, there were some settlers from the Willamette Valley heading east. Among those were Elijah Elliott and Robert Tandy. Elliott had been a supportive donor for the new road, and was traveling as far as Fort Boise to meet his wife and children who were coming with the 1853 emigration. Before he left, sponsors of the new road commissioned Elliott to lead a wagon train on the Meek Cutoff, across Harney Basin to the Deschutes River and over the Cascades using the new Free Emigrant Road.

Elliott traveled east but not on the new road. He was probably aware the Native Americans had attacked the Road Viewers the previous year, so he took the Barlow Road and the established Oregon Trail until he was able to locate his family near Fort Boise. Elliott then headed back to what is now Vale where the Cutoff begins along the Malheur River. Here he took to his new assignment with enthusiasm. By the time he was ready to embark on his adventure, there were around 100 wagons ready to follow him. Over a period of two weeks other wagons would follow and the final tally would ultimately come to 250 wagons carrying 1,027 people.

The Cutoff was around 130 miles (210 km) shorter for destinations in the Upper Willamette Valley. In spite of this, many emigrants were aware this was a risky decision. Nothing was known about road conditions, grass for the livestock or the water sources. Unfortunately the tendency was for the most needy to take the risk because their supplies were low and as autumn was approaching they did not want to get caught on the wrong side of the mountains. The story of the Donner Party, though seven years prior, was fresh on everyone's mind.

The first leg of the journey was rough travel. They were only able to follow the Malheur River for the first few miles, and then were forced to follow various streams and travel on the high ground to avoid the canyons. The road was rocky and steep in places. Finally Meek's ruts led them into Harney Valley where Elliott chose a campsite along the Silvies River near present-day Burns, Oregon.

Two large lakes are located in Harney Basin: the Malheur and Harney Lakes. Both lakes contain alkali and are nearly joined with sufficient rainfall. In 1845, Meek turned west and drove along the northern shores of these lakes. But as Elliott and his wagons drove into the Harney Basin, two of his scouts rode ahead near Wright's Point, a prominent plateau in the area. Here they encountered Indians and were chased back. With this confrontation in mind and the memory of the Road Viewer's skirmish occurring the prior year, and in the same general area, there was some reluctance to take the direct route west. After much deliberation they finally decided to go east and take the long way around the lakes.

The price the wagon train paid for this decision was about five or six extra days of difficult travel. The emigrants were already either low or out of supplies and had to resort to eating their livestock. The reason Elliott gave for his decision was to avoid fouled water–he did not mention Indian warriors–but the lake water was not drinkable and there were still long drives to fresh water. Elliott's followers reached a breaking point and by the time they reached the west end of the lakes, they began to tie wagon tongues together with the intention of hanging Mr. Elliott. There are conflicting stories regarding what happened next, but it appears Elliott's wife made an appeal to the angry travelers and defused the crisis.

=== Lost rescue party ===
When Elliott was preparing to lead the train around the lakes, he formed a rescue party to ride ahead for help and supplies. The rescue was led by Charles Clark and Robert Tandy, men who had previously settled in the Willamette Valley. Robert Tandy was the brother of William Tandy, one of the Road Viewers in 1852, but he had not planned on returning to Oregon with the 1853 emigration. If he had, he might have received detailed information from his brother William. Charles Clark returned to the U.S. in 1852 to acquire some horses and was returning in 1853. The Cutoff was an unplanned venture for him as well.

Two years prior and during their first emigration, the family of Charles Clark had been attacked by Indians, an incident known as the Clark Massacre. The family and their fellow travelers were attacked by Shoshonis and a band of red-bearded Whites. Clark's mother and brother were killed in the skirmish. In 1853 Clark was bringing tombstones west for his family members. With his losses still on his mind he led the rescue party around to the south side of Malheur Lake, and as they were traveling up the muddy Donner und Blitzen River, Clark spotted Indians on the other side. Deciding to attack he tried to enlist the other 7 members but they all refused to join him. Clark then made a lone charge across the river but his mare mired in the mud. The mare, by becoming stuck in the river bottom, managed to avert tension between the emigrants and the Northern Paiutes.

The other men in the party were Pleasant Calvin Noland, Benjamin Franklin "Frank" Owen, Andrew McClure, Job Denning, Charles Long, and James McFarland. Elijah Elliot sent the men out with seven-day rations but it took them nearly 40 days to reach the settlements. The party did not know to look for a road up the Deschutes River, they only knew they were to find Diamond Peak. When they reached the Deschutes they mistook the South Sister for Diamond Peak, setting up a difficult crossing of the mountains.

By the time they made their way down the McKenzie watershed to Springfield they were half-starved, their clothes torn, and skin lacerated from bushes and briers along the way. During the last week of their journey Frank Owen was without shoes and his feet were badly cut by the briars along the McKenzie River. Andrew McClure was a large man and suffered more from lack of nutrition. Owen, McClure and Tandy came in four days behind the others. A rescue party from the settlements was sent to find them, organized by Isaac Briggs, one of the founders of Springfield. None of the ten horses with them survived. Three of the horses had been eaten and the rest were abandoned as cripples in the mountains. McClure kept a careful diary and Owen wrote about it years later. By the time the first men of the advance party arrived in Springfield, on October 18, 1853, the wagon train had already been discovered by the Settlers of the Willamette Valley.

There were other small groups who also left the wagon train for help. Five young men followed Clark's group across the mountains and finally caught up with the leaders around the time they reached Springfield. Another party consisting of Joseph Lyman and two young men also tried to go for help. They were unable to cross the mountains, ate their three horses and followed the Deschutes River until they reached The Dalles on November 1, 1853. Joseph was finally reunited with his family in Salem, Oregon on November 8, 1853. Until then his family thought he had died in the mountains.

=== Lost wagon discovery ===
The upper Willamette settlers wondered what had become of Elliott and his wagons. Emigrants who came in on the traditional Oregon Trail reported seeing them take the Cutoff, but they were weeks overdue. Meanwhile, the first wave of wagons, numbering some 150, reached the Deschutes River at Bend, Oregon. They sent scouts to locate the road while the emigrants at the river recovered from their long cross over the desert. Sometime around October 6, 1853, a scouting party led by Snyder Saylor found the end of the road where the road builders had finished their work. The news of the new road made its way back to Bend where the wagons were waiting. As people were preparing to push south to the road, a few men tried to ride ahead to alert the settlers that they were coming.

On October 16, a man by the name of Martin Blanding pushed ahead of the others, although he was completely out of provisions and in a very weak condition. His old mare had a stillborn colt and he was cooking the colt over a fire late at night near Butte Disappointment when the settlers saw his smoke and went to investigate. The first one to find him was a 13-year-old boy by the name of David Cleveland Mathews. Mr. Blanding told them about the wagon train and that night the settlers quickly spread the news. By the next day, wagons full of provisions were heading up the Free Emigrant Road to meet the Lost Wagon Train. A large number of settlers from Lane, Linn, and Benton counties loaded up horses and wagons full of supplies, and according to contemporary letters to the Oregon Statesman, the relief was carried by 94 pack animals and 23 loaded wagons. There was some 20,000 pounds of flour, "with bacon, potatoes, onions, salt, and sugar, as well as 290 head of work and beef cattle which could be used to draw wagons or for food."

Every effort was made to bring the emigrants home safely. One exception was a tragic accident that occurred as the emigrants were attempting to cross the middle fork of the Willamette River. While going down a steep grade leading into the river, a heavy trunk loaded inside the Joseph Petty wagon went forward, causing his wife, Nancy and the infant son she was holding, to be thrown into river. Nancy Petty died at the scene and was buried beside the river, while their 8 month old son, died two weeks later. When the surviving emigrants finally arrived in Lane County, the population of the Upper Willamette Valley nearly doubled.

=== 1854 emigration ===
In 1854, another attempt was made using the Free Emigrant Road. William Macy, who led the Road Viewers in 1852 and who was one of the road commissioners in 1853, was hired for a sum of $1,000 to essentially do what Elliott had done in 1853. Macy, however, was more familiar with the route and used it to travel in both directions. When returning with emigrants he took the short route north of the lakes, shortened the distance in Central Oregon by avoiding Wagontire Mountain, and came down the Crooked River to the Deschutes, providing more water to the thirsty emigrants. Macy brought back a train of 121 wagons and they experienced few problems. Theirs was the last large emigrant group to use the Free Emigrant Road until 1859.

=== Historic trails ===
There are sixteen historic trails recognized in the State of Oregon. The Elliott Cutoff is not on the official list because it is represented by two separate trails: the Meek Cutoff and the Free Emigrant Road.

== See also ==
- Meek Cutoff
- Oregon Historic Trails Advisory Council
