= Applegate Trail =

The Applegate Trail, overlaid on a current map of Oregon

The Applegate Trail was an emigrant trail through the present-day U.S. states of Idaho, Nevada, California, and Oregon used in the mid-19th century by emigrants on the American frontier. It was originally intended as a less dangerous alternative to the Oregon Trail by which to reach the Oregon Territory. Much of the route was coterminous with the California Trail.

== Background ==
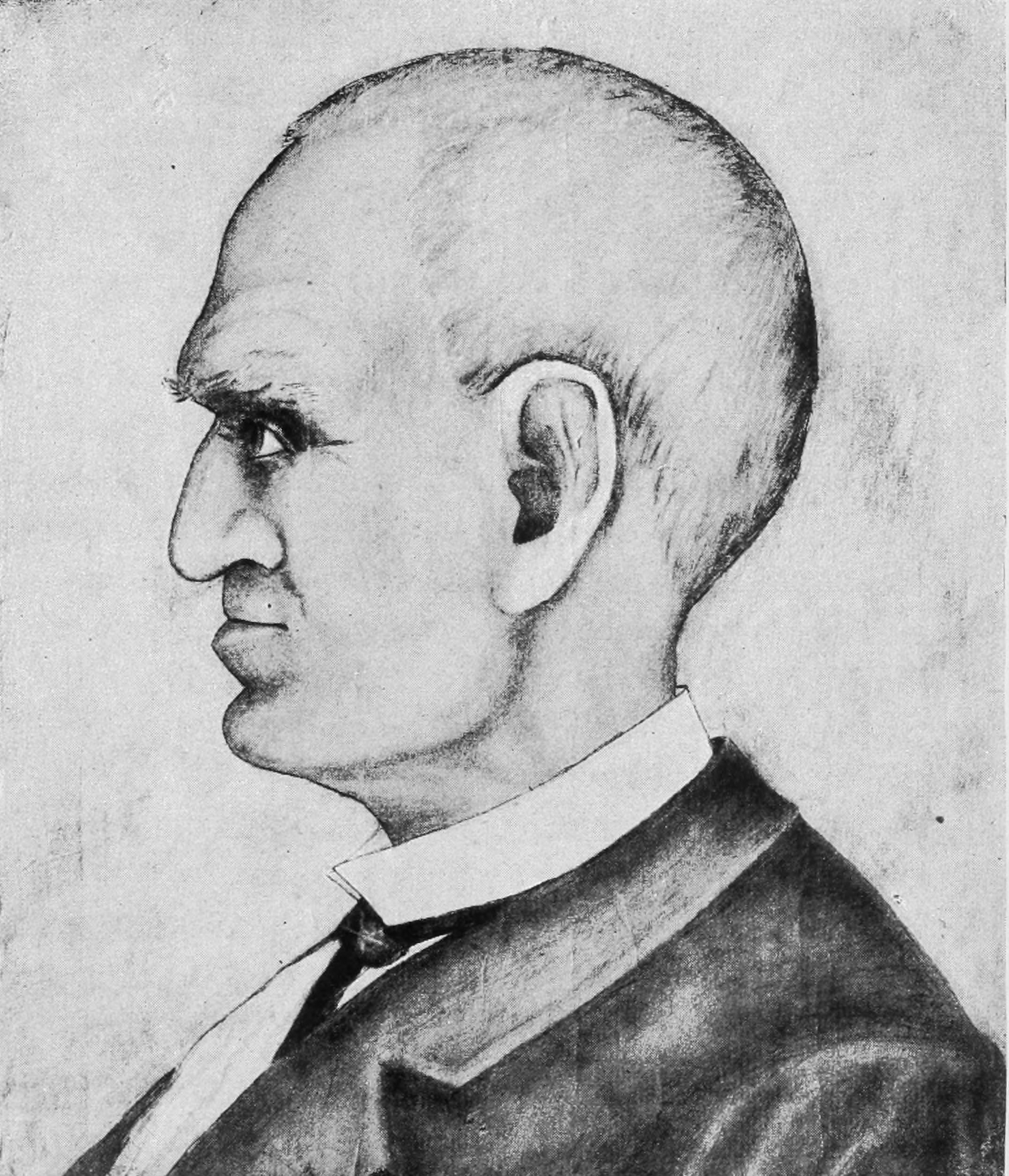
Jesse Applegate

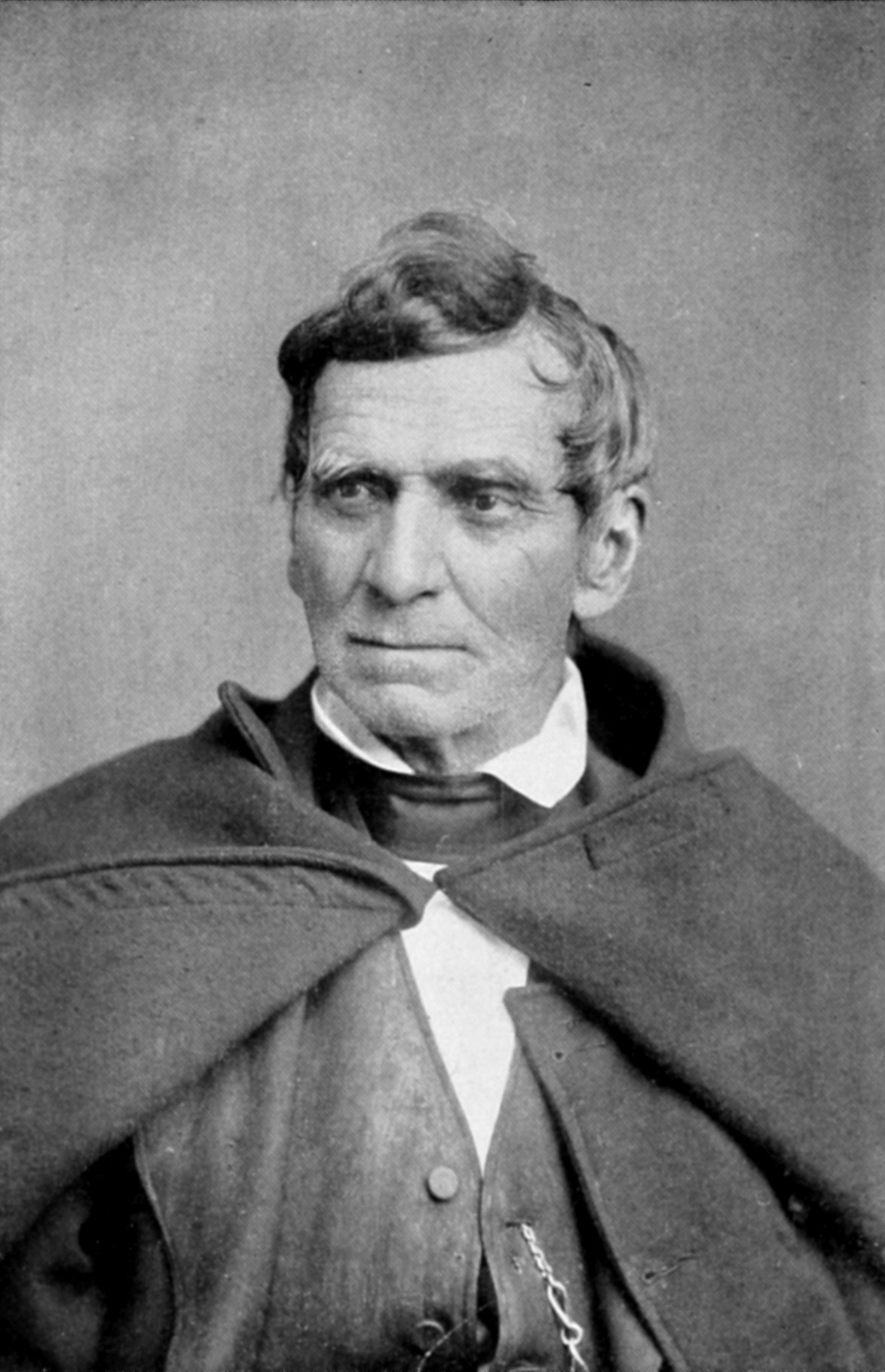
Lindsay Applegate

In 1843, part of the Applegate family of Missouri headed west along the Oregon Trail to the Oregon Country. Brothers Charles, Jesse, and Lindsay led their families through many hardships along the trail, including the loss of two children on the journey down the Columbia River. These experiences influenced the family to find an easier and safer way to the Willamette Valley.

In 1846, the Oregon Provisional Legislature allowed the Applegates and others to attempt to find a more southerly route to Oregon. The group began the trek on June 25, 1846, with Jesse Applegate, Lindsay Applegate, David Goff, John Owen, B. F. Burch, W. Sportsman, Robert Smith, a Mr. Goodhue, J. Jones, B. Ausbuan, and Levi Scott starting the survey. Leaving La Creole, the party spent three and a half months surveying a route to Fort Hall in present-day Idaho. At that location, the Applegate Trail departed the main branch of the Oregon Trail. On the return trip, the group brought approximately 150 immigrants along the new southern route, also known as the South Road, South Emigrant Trail or the Scott-Applegate Trail.

== Route ==
From Fort Hall, the route headed south following the Humboldt River before passing through the Black Rock Desert in present-day Nevada. The trail then entered Northern California and passed Goose and Tule lakes. After crossing the Lost River, the route then crossed the Klamath Basin and the Cascade Range into Southern Oregon. The trail followed Keene Creek to the Siskiyou Mountains, then Bear Creek and the Rogue River. Heading north from there, the route crossed the Umpqua River before crossing the Calapooya Mountains into the southern Willamette Valley.

== Subsequent history ==
- Applegate-Lassen Trail
- U.S. National Register of Historic Places
- U.S. Historic district
- Location: Rye Patch NW to California state line
- Part of: Black Rock Desert–High Rock Canyon Emigrant Trails National Conservation Area
- NRHP reference No.: 78001722
- Added to NRHP: December 18, 1978

After the initial party traveled the trail, it continued to be used and improved over the next few decades. In 1848, when news of the California Gold Rush reached the Willamette Valley, many settlers including Jesse and Lindsay Applegate left Oregon for the gold fields and used the trail to reach northern California. On August 3, 1992, the Applegate Trail became a National Historic Trail as part of the California National Historic Trail. The Nevada section of the trail is listed on the National Register of Historic Places as the Applegate-Lassen Trail.

== See also ==
- Barlow Road
- Huntington Wagon Road
- Meek Cutoff
- Mormon Trail
- Oregon-California Trails Association
- Oregon Historic Trails Advisory Council
- Santiam Wagon Road
