= Ignimbrite =

Type of volcanic rock

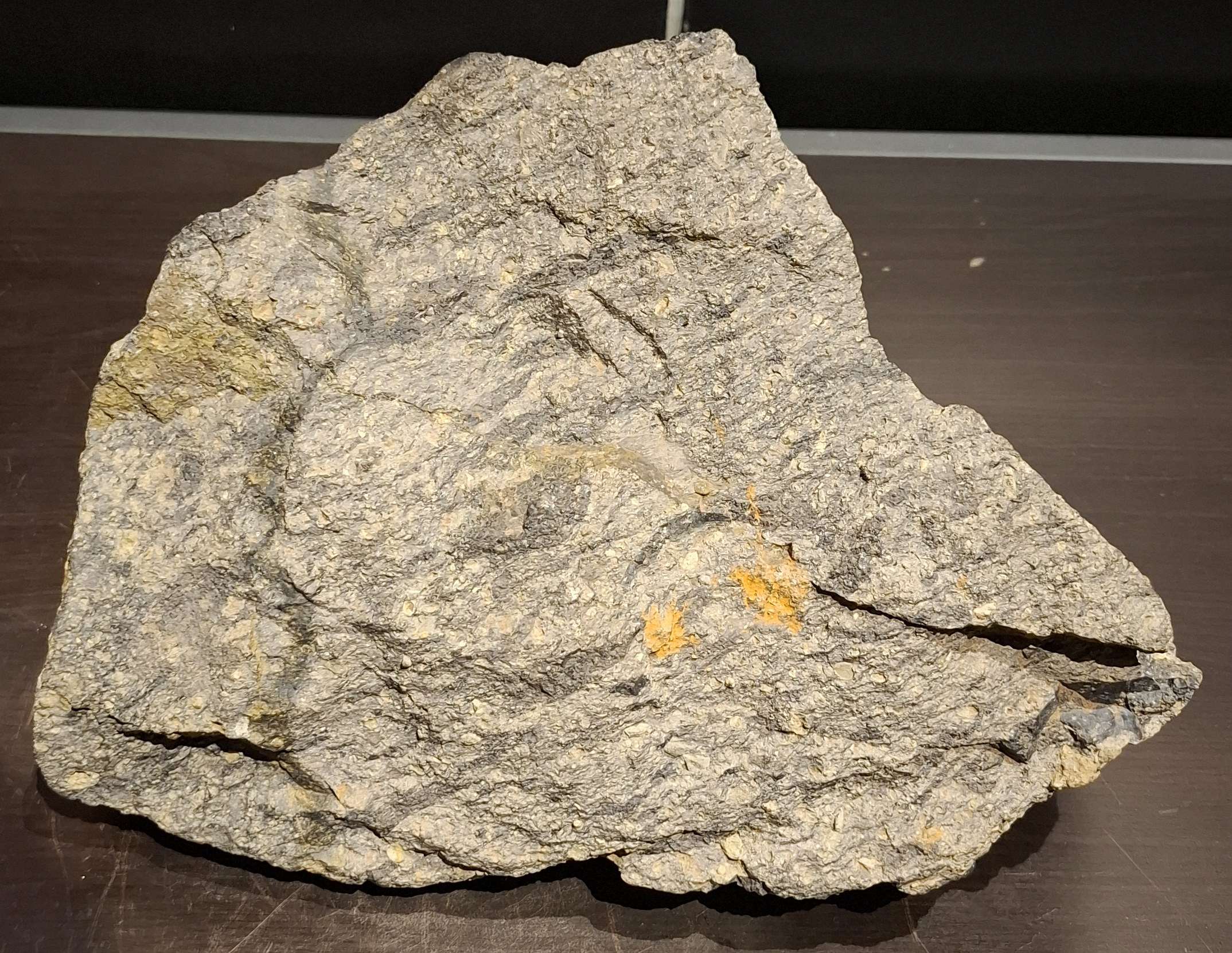
Ignimbrite from Java, Indonesia

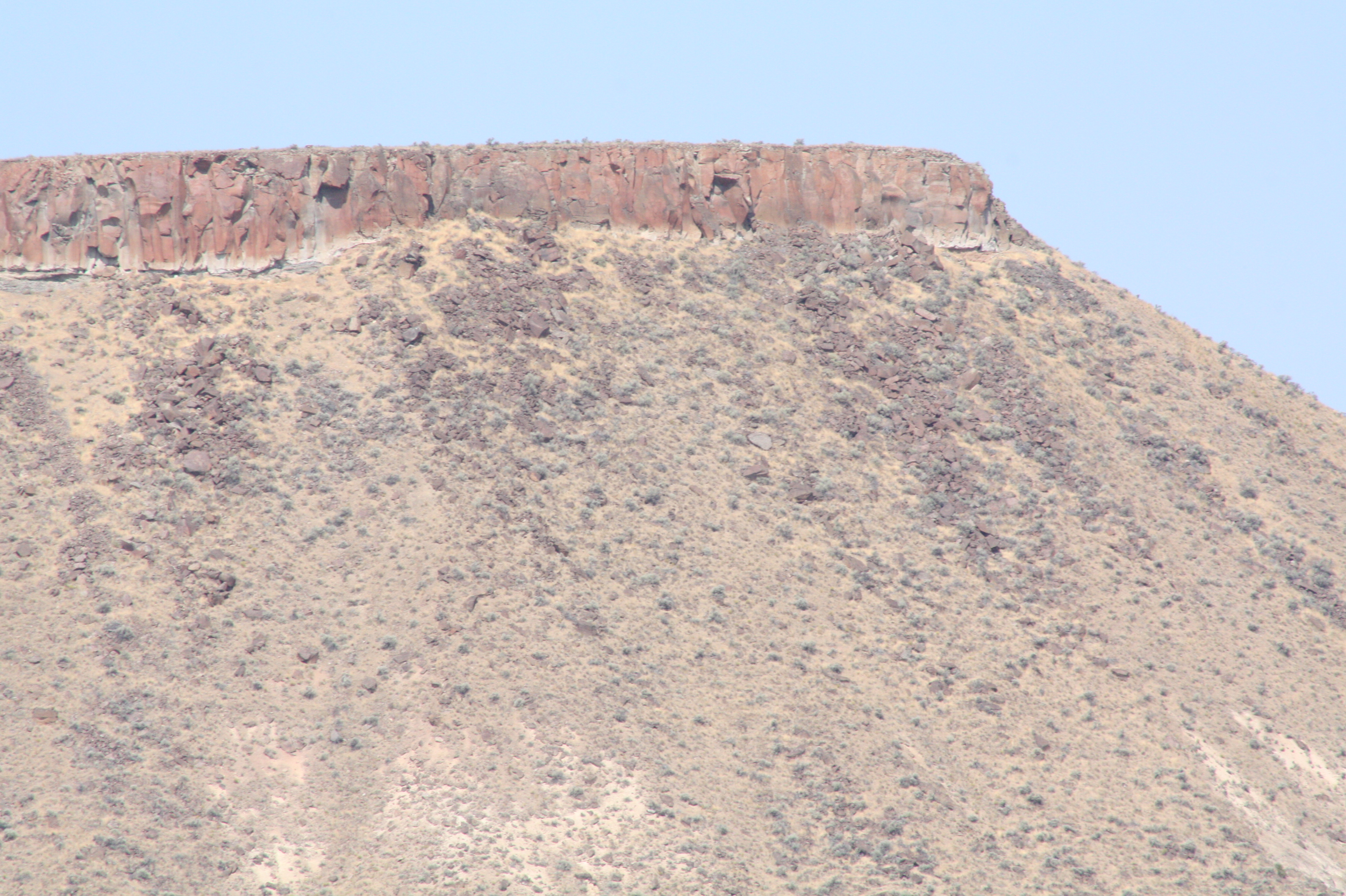
The caprock in this photo is the ignimbrite layer of the Rattlesnake Formation in Oregon.

Ignimbrite is a type of volcanic rock, consisting of a typically welded tuff. Ignimbrites form from the deposits of pyroclastic flows, which are a hot suspension of particles and gases flowing rapidly from a volcano, driven by being denser than the surrounding atmosphere. New Zealand geologist Patrick Marshall (1869–1950) coined the term ignimbrite from the Latin igni- [fire] and imbri- [rain].

Ignimbrites are made of a very poorly sorted mixture of volcanic ash (or tuff when lithified) and pumice and/or scoria lapilli, commonly with scattered lithic fragments. The ash is composed of glass shards and crystal fragments. Ignimbrites may be fairly loose and unconsolidated, or a poor to strongly lithified (solidified) rock called lapilli tuff. Near the volcanic source, ignimbrites often contain thick accumulations of lithic blocks, and distally, many show meter-thick accumulations of rounded cobbles of pumice. Ignimbrites may be white, grey, pink, beige, brown, or black depending on their composition and density. Many pale ignimbrites are dacitic or rhyolitic. Darker-coloured ignimbrites may be densely welded volcanic glass or, less commonly, mafic in composition.

== Deposition ==
Two main models have been proposed to explain the deposition of ignimbrites from a pyroclastic density current: the en masse deposition and the progressive aggradation models.

=== En masse model ===
The en masse model was proposed by volcanologist Stephen Sparks in 1976. Sparks attributed the poor sorting in ignimbrites to laminar flows of very high particle concentration. Pyroclastic flows were envisioned as being similar to debris flows, with a body undergoing laminar flow and then stopping en masse. The flow would travel as a plug flow, with an essentially non-deforming mass travelling on a thin shear zone, and the en masse freezing occurs when the driving stress falls below a certain level. This would produce a massive unit with an inversely graded base.

There are several problems with the en masse model. Since ignimbrite is a deposit, its characteristics cannot completely represent the flow, and the deposit may only record the depositional process. Vertical chemical zonation in ignimbrites is interpreted as recording incremental changes in the deposition, and the zonation rarely correlates with flow unit boundaries and may occur within flow units. It has been posited that the chemical changes are recording progressive aggradation at the base of the flow from an eruption whose composition changes with time. For this to be so, the base of the flow cannot be turbulent. The instantaneous deposition of an entire body of material is not possible because displacement of the fluid is not possible instantaneously. Any displacement of the fluid would mobilize the upper part of the flow, and en masse deposition would not occur. Instantaneously cessation of the flow would cause local compression and extension, which would be evident in the form of tension cracks and small scale thrusting, which is not seen in most ignimbrites.

An adaptation of the en masse theory suggests that the ignimbrite records progressive aggradation from a sustained current and that the differences observed between ignimbrites and within an ignimbrite are the result of temporal changes to the nature of the flow that deposited it.

=== Rheomorphic flow model ===
Rheomorphic flow structures in a welded ignimbrite, Isle of Lipari, Italy

Rheomorphic structures are only observed in high grade ignimbrites. There are two types of rheomorphic flow; post-depositional re-mobilization, and late stage viscous flow. While there is currently debate in the field of the relative importance of either mechanism, there is agreement that both mechanisms have an effect. A vertical variation in orientation of the structures is compelling evidence against post-depositional re-mobilization being responsible for the majority of the structures, but more work needs to be carried out to discover if the majority of ignimbrites have these vertical variations in order to say which process is the most common.

A model based on observations at the Wall Mountain Tuff at Florissant Fossil Beds National Monument in Colorado suggests that the rheomorphic structures such as foliation and pyroclasts were formed during laminar viscous flow as the density current comes to a halt. A change from particulate flow to a viscous fluid could cause the rapid en masse cooling in the last few meters. It is also theorized that transformation occurs at a boundary layer at the base of the flow and that all the materials pass through this layer during deposition.

Another model proposed is that the density current became stationary before the rheomorphic structures form. Structures such as pervasive foliation are a result of load compaction, and other structures are the result of remobilization by load and deposition on inclined topography. The tuff deposited at Wagontire Mountain in Oregon and Bishop Tuff in California show evidence of late stage viscous flow. These tuffs have a similar chemistry and so must have undergone the same compaction process to have the same foliation.

The Green Tuff in Pantelleria contains rheomorphic structures which are held to be a result of post-depositional re-mobilization because it is believed the Green Tuff is a fall deposit that has no lateral transport. Similarities between the structures in the Green Tuff and ignimbrites on Gran Canaria suggest post-depositional re-mobilization. This interpretation of the deposition of the Green Tuff has been disputed, suggesting that it is an ignimbrite, and structures such as imbricate fiamme, observed in the Green Tuff, were the result of late stage primary viscous flow. Similar structures observed on Gran Canaria had been interpreted as syn-depositional flow.

Sheathfolds and other rheomorphic structures may be the result of a single stage of shear. Shear possibly occurred as the density current passed over the forming deposit. Vertical variations in the orientations of sheathfolds are evidence that rheomorphism and welding can occur syn-depositionally. It has been disputed that the shear between the density current and the forming deposit is significant enough to cause all of the rheomorphic structures observed in ignimbrites, although the shear could be responsible for some of the structures such as imbricate fiamme.

== Petrology ==
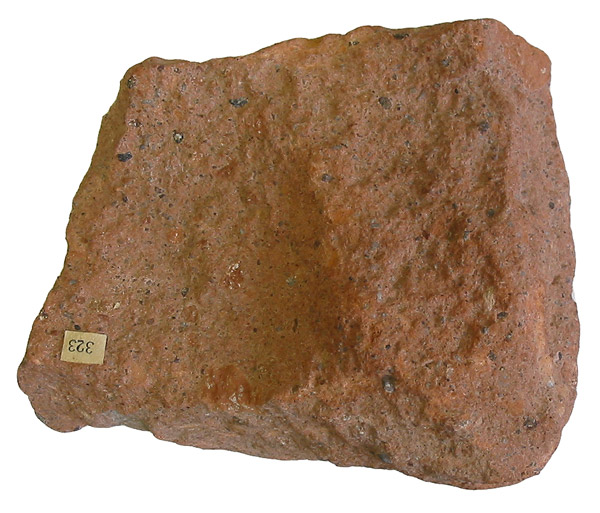
A block of ignimbrite

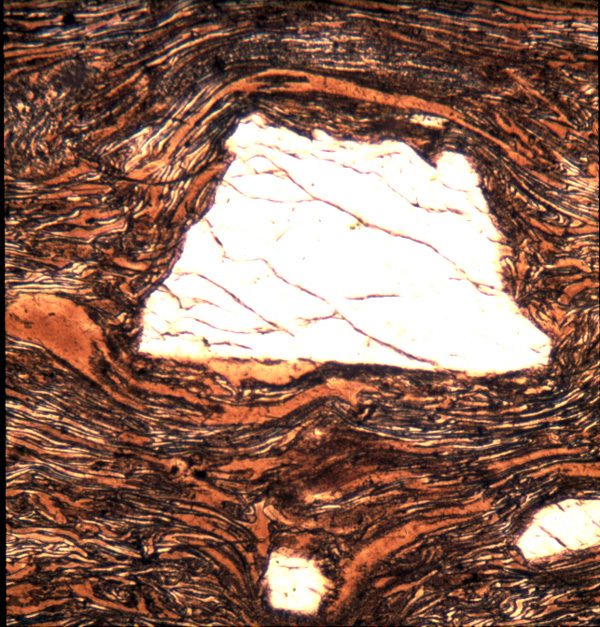
Light microscope image of a welded ignimbrite, composed of eutaxitic lapilli-tuff as seen in thin section (Long dimension is several mm). The glass shards (mostly brown) sometimes become welded together when the deposit is still hot, and can be deformed by flow and compaction about crystal fragments (clear).

Ignimbrite is primarily composed of a matrix of volcanic ash (tephra) which is composed of shards and fragments of volcanic glass, pumice fragments, and crystals. The crystal fragments are commonly blown apart by the explosive eruption. Most are phenocrysts that grew in the magma, but some may be exotic crystals such as xenocrysts, derived from other magmas, igneous rocks, or from country rock.

The ash matrix typically contains varying amounts of pea- to cobble-sized rock fragments called lithic inclusions. They are mostly bits of older solidified volcanic debris entrained from conduit walls or from the land surface. More rarely, clasts are cognate material from the magma chamber.

If sufficiently hot when deposited, the particles in an ignimbrite may weld together, and the deposit is transformed into a 'welded ignimbrite', made of eutaxitic lapilli-tuff. When this happens, the pumice lapilli commonly flatten, and these appear on rock surfaces as dark lens shapes, known as fiamme. Intensely welded ignimbrite may have glassy zones near the base and top, called lower and upper 'vitrophyres', but central parts are microcrystalline ('lithoidal').

== Mineralogy ==
The mineralogy of an ignimbrite is controlled primarily by the chemistry of the source magma.

The typical range of phenocrysts in ignimbrites are biotite, quartz, sanidine or other alkali feldspar, occasionally hornblende, rarely pyroxene and in the case of phonolite tuffs, the feldspathoid minerals such as nepheline and leucite.

Commonly in most felsic ignimbrites the quartz polymorphs cristobalite and tridymite are usually found within the welded tuffs and breccias. In the majority of cases, it appears that these high-temperature polymorphs of quartz occurred post-eruption as part of an autogenic post-eruptive alteration in some metastable form. Thus although tridymite and cristobalite are common minerals in ignimbrites, they may not be primary magmatic minerals.

== Geochemistry ==
Most ignimbrites are silicic, with generally over 65% SiO_{2} but this can vary per sample. The chemistry of the ignimbrites, like all felsic rocks, and the resultant mineralogy of phenocryst populations within them, is related mostly to the varying contents of sodium, potassium, calcium, the lesser amounts of iron and magnesium.

Some rare ignimbrites are andesitic, and may even be formed from volatile saturated basalt, where the ignimbrite would have the geochemistry of a normal basalt.

An example of an ignimbrite with a varying composition is the Pleistocene aged Diliman Tuff. It is a basaltic trachyandesitic to trachydacitic with a composition of 54 to 65 wt.% SiO_{2} in a single fragment of pumice from the tuff.

== Alteration ==
Large hot ignimbrites can create some form of hydrothermal activity as they tend to blanket the wet soil and bury watercourses and rivers. The water from such substrates will exit the ignimbrite blanket in fumaroles, geysers and the like, a process which may take several years, for example after the Novarupta tuff eruption. In the process of boiling off this water, the ignimbrite layer may become metasomatised (altered). This tends to form chimneys and pockets of kaolin-altered rock.

=== Welding ===
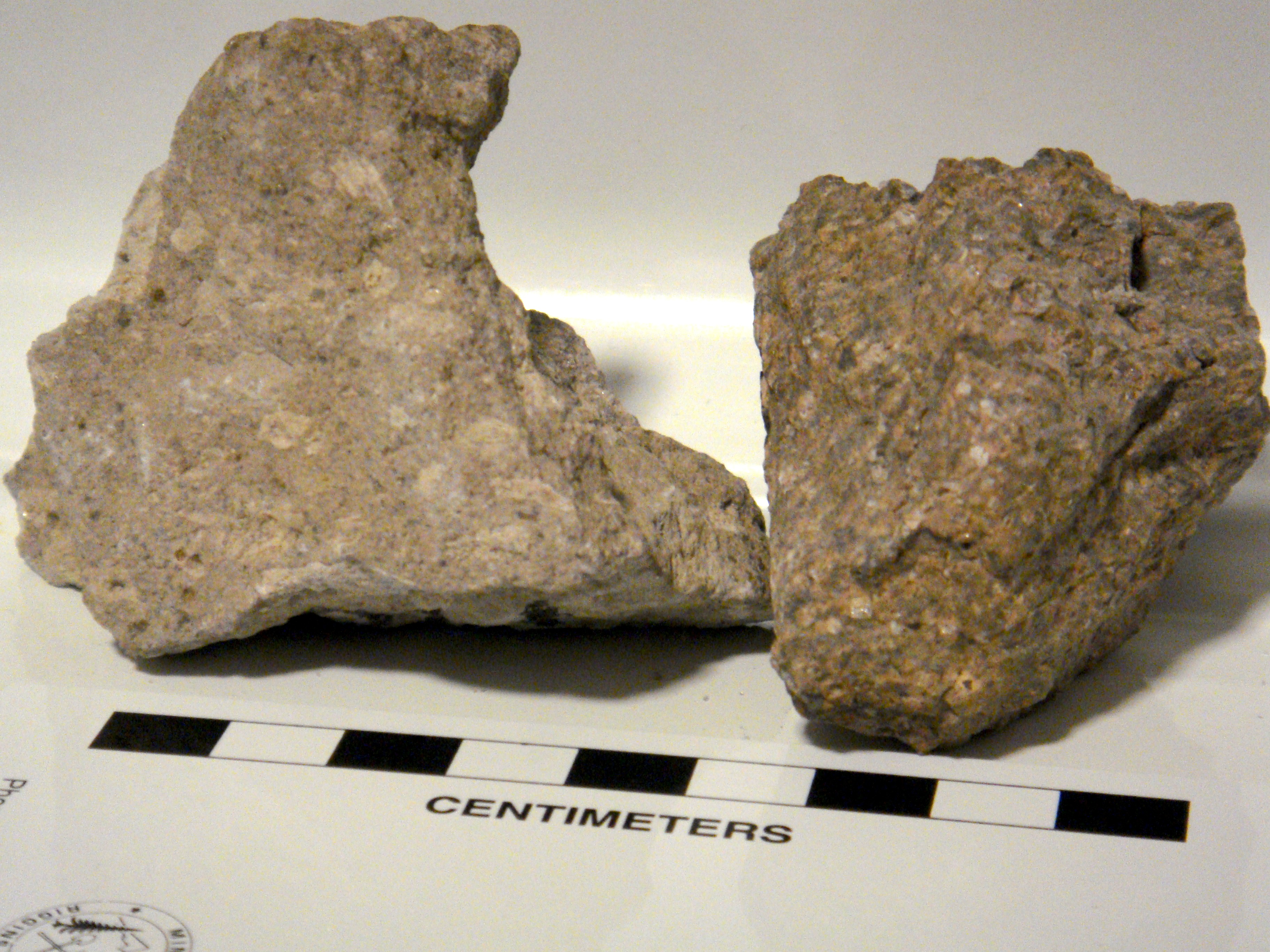
Rocks from the Bishop tuff from California, United States, uncompressed with pumice on left; compressed with fiamme on right

Welding is a common form of ignimbrite alteration. There are two types of welding, primary and secondary. If the density current is sufficiently hot the particles will agglutinate and weld at the surface of sedimentation to form a viscous fluid; this is primary welding. If during transport and deposition the temperature is low, then the particles will not agglutinate and weld, although welding may occur later if compaction or other factors reduce the minimum welding temperature to below the temperature of the glassy particles; this is secondary welding. This secondary welding is most common and suggests that the temperature of most pyroclastic density currents is below the softening point of the particles.

The factor that determines whether an ignimbrite has primary welding, secondary welding or no welding is debated:

- Different chemical compositions will lower the viscosity and enable primary weld.
- There is not enough variation in the composition of primary and secondary welded ignimbrites for this to be a major factor.
- Cooling during transport is negligible, so if the eruption temperature is high enough then primary welding will occur. Lateral variations in degree of welding are not a result of cooling during transport.
- Lithostatic load is responsible for the intensity of welding because the Tiribi ignimbrite is most densely welded where the thickness is greatest. The correlation is not perfect, and that other factors may have an influence.
- There are two lines of evidence for the relative unimportance of lithostatic load in determining the intensity of welding; lateral changes in the degree of welding irrespective of thickness and cases where the degree of welding correlates with the chemical zoning. Welding is determined by a combination of factors including compositional changes, volatile content, temperature, grain size population and lithic content.

== Morphology and occurrence ==
Landscapes formed by erosion in hardened ignimbrite can be remarkably similar to those formed on granitic rocks. In Sierra de Lihuel Calel, La Pampa Province, Argentina, various landforms typical of granites can be observed in ignimbrite. These landforms are inselbergs, flared slopes, domes, nubbins, tors, tafonis and gnammas. In addition, just like in granite landscapes landforms in ignimbrites may be influenced by joint systems.

== Distribution ==
Ignimbrites occur worldwide associated with many volcanic provinces having high-silica content magma and the resulting explosive eruptions.

Ignimbrite occurs very commonly around the lower Hunter Region of the Australian state of New South Wales. The ignimbrite quarried in the Hunter region at locations such as Martins Creek, Brandy Hill, Seaham (Boral) and at abandoned quarry at Raymond Terrace is a volcanic sedimentation rock of Carboniferous age (280–345 million years). It had an extremely violent origin. This material built up to considerable depth and must have taken years to cool down completely. In the process the materials that made up this mixture fused together into a very tough rock of medium density.

Ignimbrite also occurs in the Coromandel region of New Zealand, where the striking orange-brown ignimbrite cliffs form a distinctive feature of the landscape. The nearby Taupō Volcanic Zone is covered in extensive flat sheets of ignimbrite erupted from caldera volcanoes during the Pleistocene and Holocene. The exposed ignimbrite cliffs at Hinuera (Waikato) mark the edges of the ancient Waikato River course which flowed through the valley before the last major Taupō eruption 1,800 years ago (the Hatepe eruption). The west cliffs are quarried to get blocks of Hinuera Stone, the name given to welded ignimbrite used for building cladding. The stone is light grey with traces of green and is slightly porous.

Huge deposits of ignimbrite form large parts of the Sierra Madre Occidental in western Mexico. In the western United States, massive ignimbrite deposits up to several hundred metres thick occur in the Basin and Range Province, largely in Nevada, western Utah, southern Arizona, and north-central and southern New Mexico, and the Snake River Plain. The magmatism in the Basin and Range Province included a massive flare-up of ignimbrite which began about 40 million years ago and largely ended 25 million years ago: the magmatism followed the end of the Laramide orogeny, when deformation and magmatism occurred far east of the plate boundary. Additional eruptions of ignimbrite continued in Nevada until roughly 14 million years ago. Individual eruptions were often enormous, sometimes up to thousands of cubic kilometres in volume, giving them a Volcanic Explosivity Index of 8, comparable to Yellowstone Caldera and Lake Toba eruptions.

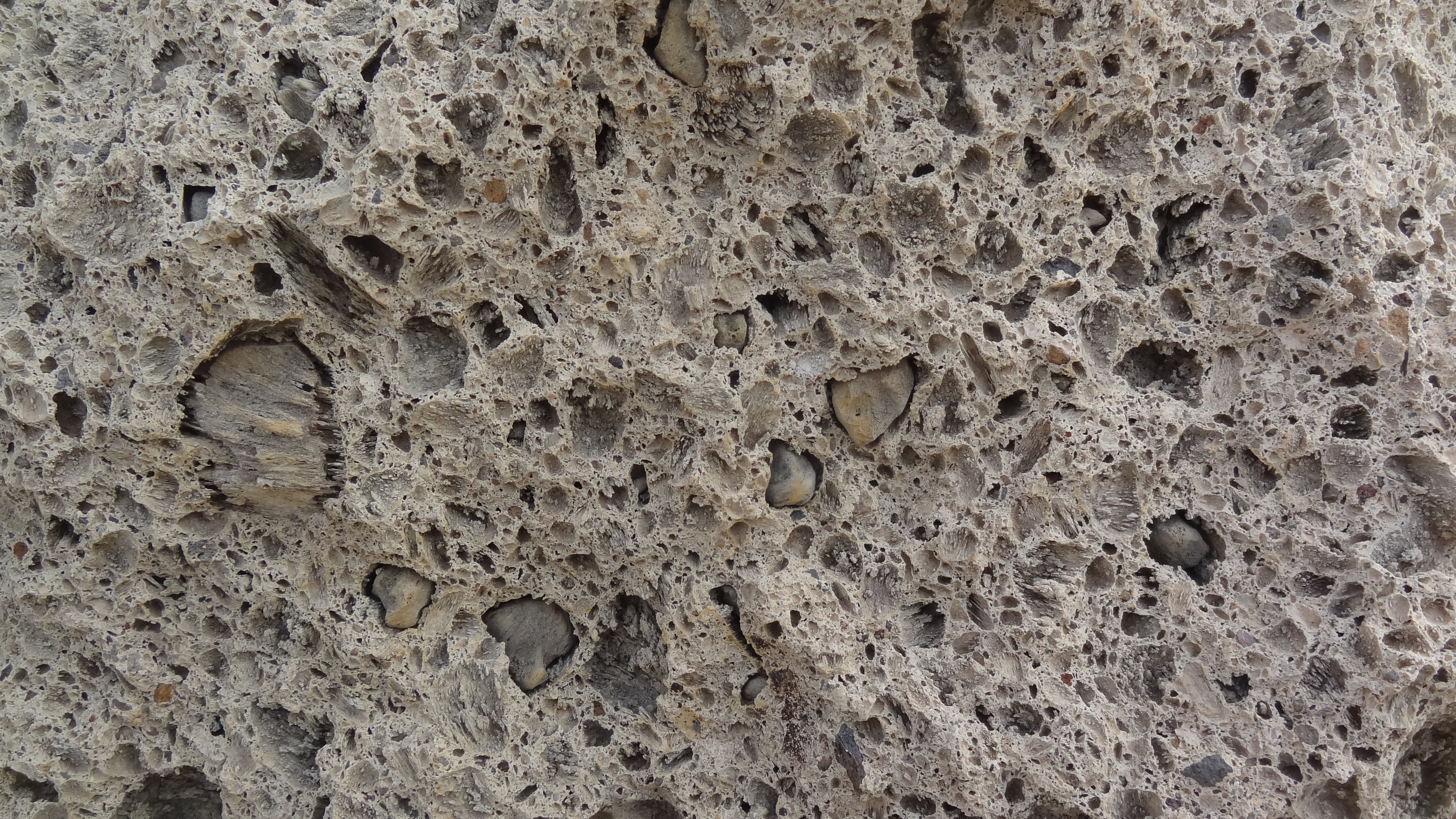
Ignimbrite in an abandoned quarry near La Caleta, Tenerife

Successions of ignimbrites make up a large part of the volcanic rock accumulations formed in the post-erosional phase of volcanic activity on the islands of Tenerife and Gran Canaria.

The Diliman Tuff is a basaltic trachyandesitic to trachydacitic that underlies Manila. It consists of an ignimbrite along with reworked and airfall pumiceous tuff units. Magma mixing and mingling is shown by banded textures in some of its pumice fragments with a groundmass composition of 54 to 65 wt.% SiO_{2} in a single pumice fragment. Despite the proximity to nearby volcanoes, the source volcano of this deposit has not yet been discovered. It is chemically distinct from adjacent Taal Caldera to the south and the Laguna Caldera to the southeast. The two main types are the mixed scoria and pumice pyroclastic flow and the predominantly fine grained and more pumice rich ignimbrite. There are not just two but several more units of ignimbrites that underlie Manila. There are two additional types of tuff found in Quezon City. The lower layer of this formation is primarily composed of pumiceous welded tuff with scoria. It is primarily found in Diliman in Quezon City in which this is likely the source name of the tuff. It is the lower part of Diliman tuff. It is more coarse in the lower part and outcrops of this formation can be found in the north and the east of Diliman containing a lot of large scoria. In the upper part of the lower layer of the Diliman tuff, the scoriacous breccia decreases and pumice breccia increases. The upper layer of the formation In this rock formation, like the lower pyroclastic rock bed, the scoria decreases and the pumice breccia becomes dominant. The average diameter of the pumice clasts becomes less than 1 cm.

== Use ==
Yucca Mountain Repository, a U.S. Department of Energy terminal storage facility for spent nuclear reactor and other radioactive waste, is in a deposit of ignimbrite and tuff.

The layering of ignimbrites is used when the stone is worked, as it sometimes splits into convenient slabs, useful for flagstones and in garden edge landscaping.

In the Hunter region of New South Wales, ignimbrite serves as an excellent aggregate or "blue metal" for road surfacing and construction purposes.

== See also ==
- Bluestone – Name for a number of varieties of stone
- Pyroclastic rock – Clastic rocks composed solely or primarily of volcanic materials
- Lava – Molten rock expelled by a volcano during an eruption
- Magma – Hot semifluid material found beneath the surface of Earth
