= Meek Cutoff =

Wagon trail of the 19th century

Coordinates: 43.97886°N 117.25871°W

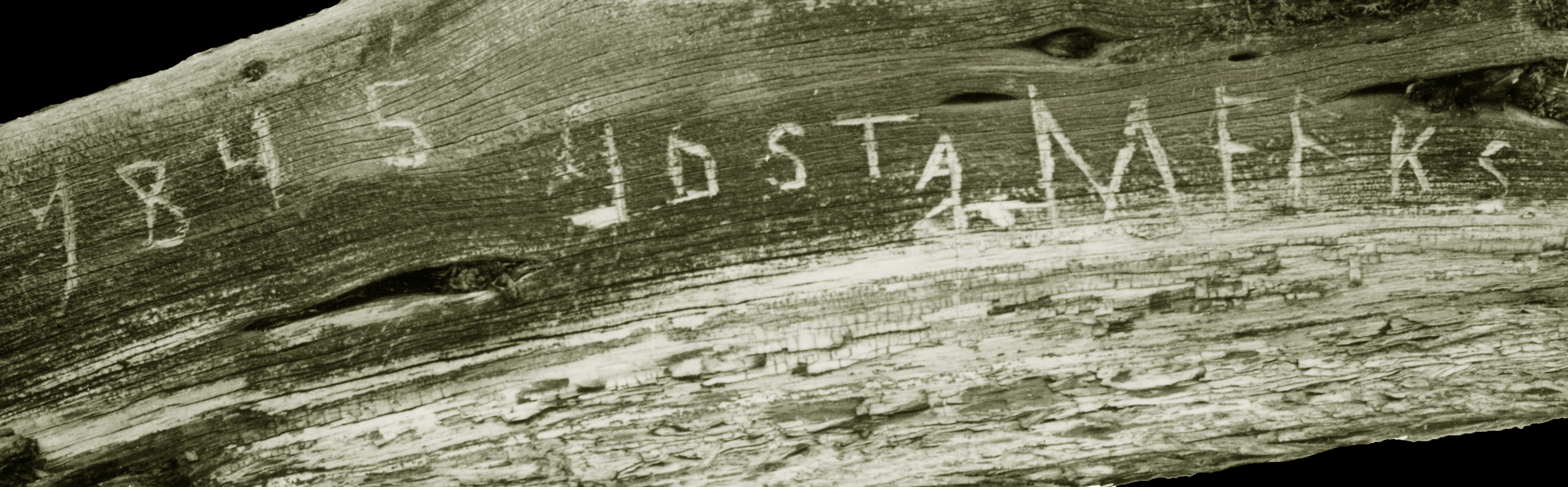
Emigrants marked their path on this juniper limb, found southeast of present-day Redmond, Oregon. The limb is now on display in the Deschutes County Museum.

Meek Cutoff was a wagon trail that branched off the Oregon Trail in eastern Oregon and was used as an alternate emigrant route to the Willamette Valley in the mid-19th century. The trail was named for frontiersman Stephen Meek, who was hired to lead the first wagon train along it in 1845. The journey was a particularly hard one, and many of the pioneers lost their lives.

Starting where the Oregon Trail leaves the Snake River Plain and heads northwest toward the Columbia River Gorge (the general route of modern Interstate 84), Meek's party intended to instead head west across the Oregon High Desert, straight to the Willamette Valley. They left the main trail at Vale, Oregon and followed the Malheur River to head into the Harney Basin. They then turned west towards Wagontire Mountain and northwest to the south fork of the Crooked River. At this point, due to hardship, the party split into two groups, each of which found the Deschutes River. The two groups reunited north of where the Crooked River empties into the Deschutes and, deflecting from their original westward purpose, followed the river to the Columbia and rejoined the Oregon Trail at The Dalles.

In 1853, the Elliott Cutoff was established, completing Meek's purpose by turning upstream at the Deschutes River for 30 miles (48 km) and then crossing the Cascade Mountains at Willamette Pass.

== History ==
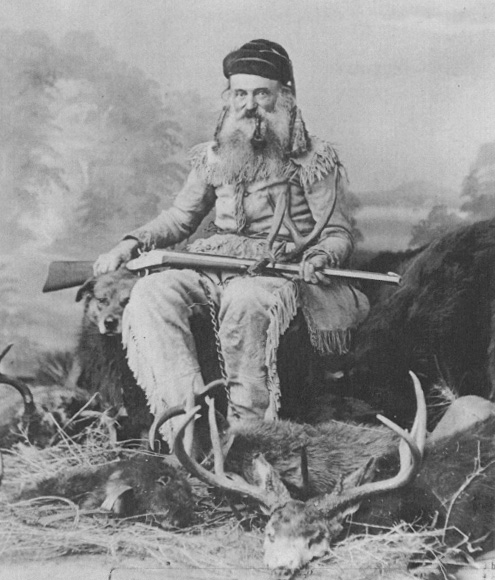
Stephen Meek

In 1845, there were rumors circulating among the emigrants on the Oregon Trail that Walla Walla and Cayuse Indians might possibly attack the settlers in the Blue Mountains of Oregon or along the Columbia River. Reports of threats came in conjunction with the murder of two Frenchmen in the area. Stephen Meek, the older brother of Joe Meek, was an experienced fur trapper and explorer who made his living as a wagon train guide. Meek was unemployed at the time but was considered to be someone who was familiar with eastern Oregon. When he offered the emigrants an alternate route to avoid the Blue Mountains many decided to follow him. Some 200 wagons and 1,000 people turned off the primary Oregon Trail at Vale and followed Meek into the Oregon desert, where no wagons had traveled before.

=== Blazing a new trail ===
Meek led the wagon train southwest through the Malheur Mountains. The party followed the Malheur River for the first two days but were then forced into the hill country. As they progressed the road became stonier. It was so hard on the oxen that several died each day.

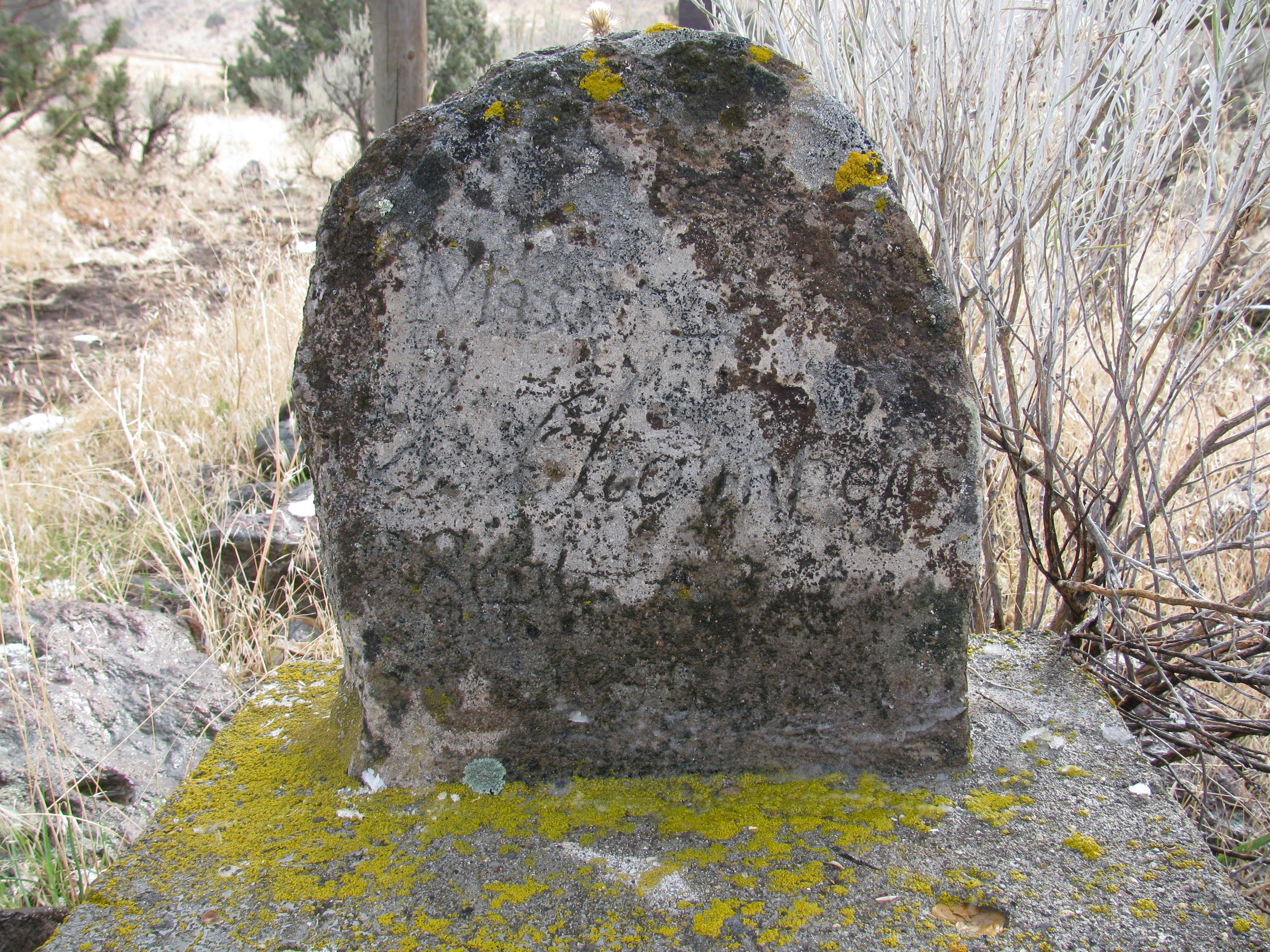
The grave of Sarah "Sally" King Chambers. The inscription reads "Mrs. S Chambers Sep 3rd 1845".

Some of the emigrants were not doing well, especially those who were already sick when the train took the cutoff. Just west of Castle Rock and along the North Fork of the Malheur River, Rowland Chambers' wife Sarah, the Captain's daughter and a young mother of two small children, was now critically ill, having contracted camp fever earlier in the journey. "Everything possible was done to ease her distress as she lay in the wagon hovering between life and death but alas, to no avail. Sarah breathed her last breath at this camp and was laid to rest beneath the sagebrush." The next day the grieving husband was left behind with a horse as the train continued to journey on. He went down to the river and found a native stone that he smoothed, then carved this inscription: "Mrs. S Chambers, Sep 3rd 1845." It remains one of the few Oregon Trail gravestones in existence.

The very next day the train experienced its most difficult ascent. In order to reach a ridge west of the North Fork of the Malheur River, the emigrants were forced to climb a steep, narrow ravine choked with boulders. One emigrant wrote about moving "ten thousand stones" in order to make a roadbed. Some of the wagons were damaged during the 1,000 foot (300 m) climb, but they were soon repaired and the wagons continued over the hill and down to Cottonwood Creek.

The train continued over mountains until it finally came down East Cow Creek into the Harney Basin, in a region known today as the Oregon High Desert. The expression on Meek's face "changed to one of complete bewilderment, as if he were seeing the country for the first time." When trapping in this area 10 years prior, the alkaline lakes had flooded a large portion of the valley. But now it was a drought year, the lakes were small and everything looked different. They continued south along the Silvies River and out into the lakebed, where they turned west. As they made their way to Silver Creek there were some in the forward company who insisted they continue west to find a pass over the Cascades. Meek wanted to follow Silver Creek to the north, but they refused to follow him.

On September 11, 1845, James Field wrote in his diary:

It was his intention to follow down Crooked River to the Deschutes and down it to the old road, but when he came to the marshy lake spoken of last Sunday, the company refused to follow him if he made the circuit necessary to get around it upon Crooked river again so he struck off in a westerly direction in order to get upon the main Deschutes River. He well knew that there was a scarcity of grass and water across here and so informed them, but it was nearer and they would have him go it, and now blame him for coming the route they obliged him to.

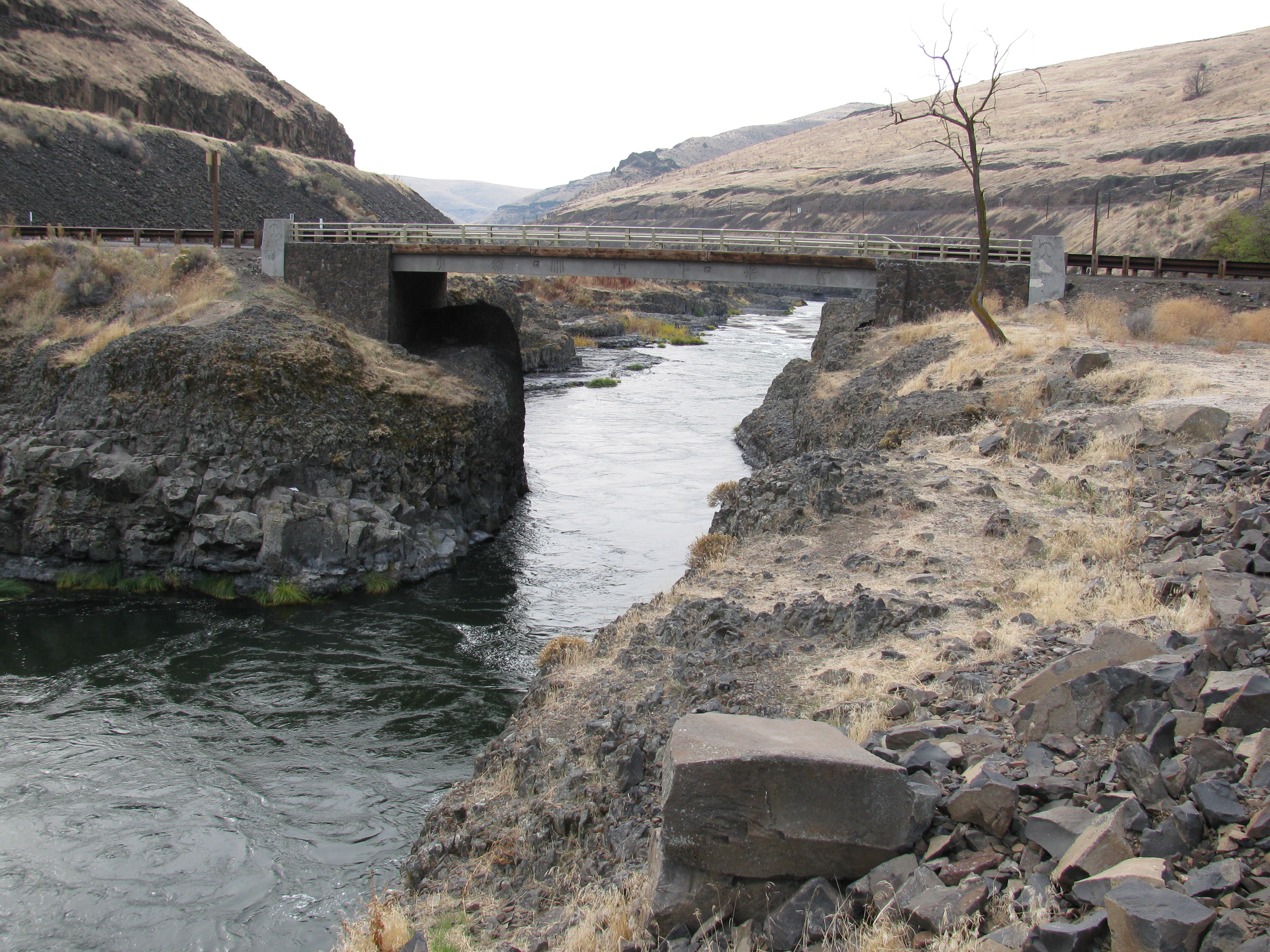
Sherar's Bridge was later built where some in Meek's wagon train built an elaborate pulley system to get people and wagons across the Deschutes River. Others tied ropes across the river banks about two miles (3.2 km) upstream and used their wagon box as a boat to cross the swift current.

The train continued to Wagontire Mountain, a name it later received when early settlers found a wagon tire there. Here the emigrants camped in and around what they called the "Lost Hollow". There was water and grass but not an ample supply for the emigrants and all their livestock. As emigrants further back in the train continued to arrive, circumstances in the camp became desperate. Water quickly became scarce and many ran out of their staple supplies. In a weakened condition, more travelers became sick. Camp fever and other ailments began to overcome large numbers, especially the children and elders.

On September 13, Field again wrote:

Started this morning in expectation of a long drive across the plain before us, but when about four miles (6.4 km) from camp met Meek's wife in company with a friend, returning with the news that they had found no water as yet and requesting all who were at the spring to remain there until he found a camp and returned or sent word back for them to come on. Nothing remained for us to do but drive back to the camp we had just left, where we found Teatherow's company also, so if misery loves company here is enough of it, for this small camping spot is nearly eaten out by our own large stock of cattle, and to add to all this there are some in the company nearly out of provisions.

For weeks the emigrants had been finding out how unfamiliar Meek was with the area, especially as the wagons followed a serpentine route into Harney Valley. However, there was always enough grass and water to get by. But now as the train became stalled at the Lost Hollow tensions reached a boiling point. Scouts were sent out in all directions looking for water and they searched for long distances but all came back empty-handed.

In 1849, Betsy Bayley recalled this event in a letter written to her sister in Ohio:

We camped at a spring which we gave the name of "The Lost Hollow" because there was very little water there. We had men out in every direction in search of water. They traveled 40 or 50 miles (64 or 80 km) in search of water but found none. You cannot imagine how we all felt. Go back, we could not and we knew not what was before us. Our provisions were failing us. There was sorrow and dismay depicted on every countenance. We were like mariners lost at sea and in this mountainous wilderness we had to remain for five days. At last we concluded to take a Northwesterly direction . . . . After we got in the right direction, people began to get sick.

The search for water ended when Meek climbed Midnight Point and from there he could see Buck Creek 25 miles (40 km) due north. The emigrants immediately left for Buck Creek but from this point on they were no longer following Meek.

During this period of the journey – while emigrants were driving their livestock throughout the night to water – the John Herren family reportedly found some gold nuggets, which led to the legend of the Lost Blue Bucket Mine. The name came from the story later circulated by some of the emigrants. The Herrens reported that if they had remained at their campsite they could have filled a blue bucket with gold nuggets. This place has never been found, but if it exists it is thought by some to be between Wagontire Mountain and the south fork of the Crooked River.

=== The train splits ===
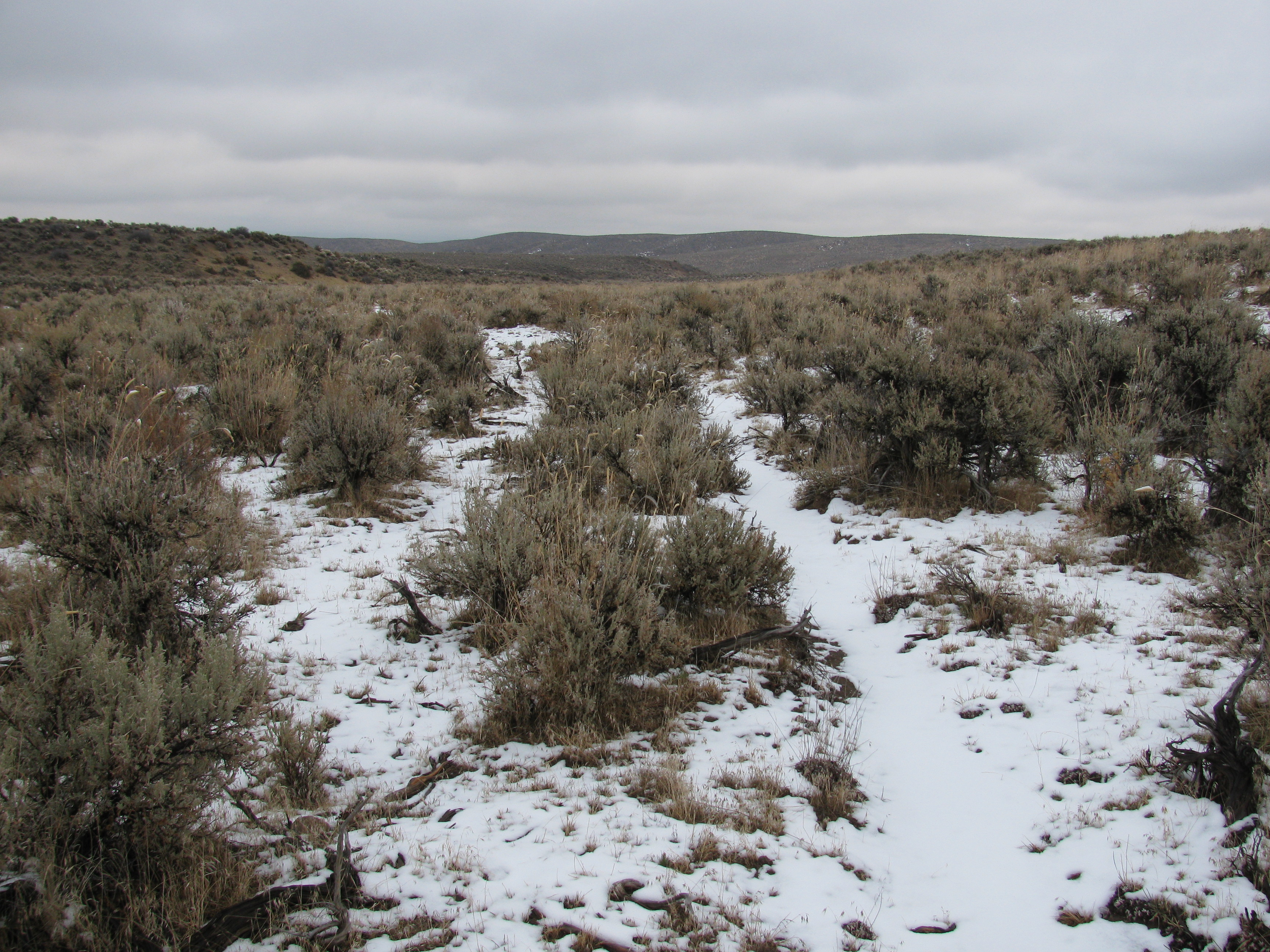
Ruts of Meek's and Elliott's wagons near Westfall, Oregon

When the train reached the springs at the south fork one group turned west while the other continued north. The larger group followed Samuel Parker up to Steen's Ridge where wagon ruts can still be seen today. Their goal was to follow the Crooked River. The smaller group with Solomon Tetherow continued west along the north side of Hampton Butte and then followed Bear Creek. Meek traveled with this smaller company. With the help of a Native American who guided the group to water in exchange for a blanket, they reached the Deschutes River where Cline Falls is today, and then followed the Deschutes north. This group suffered more for lack of supplies, so they sent a relief party ahead to The Dalles. The relief party thought it would be a two-day journey, but it took them ten days. When they arrived at The Dalles they were in a starving condition and so weak that some of the men needed help dismounting their horses.

=== The train reunites ===
On September 26, 1845, both groups arrived on the same day at Sagebrush Springs near present-day Gateway, Oregon. They had all traveled a long distance without water, and the whole train stopped to rest on the 27th. On that day Samuel Parker entered in his diary:

May codent get to water and water was taken to them, 32 in number. Heare we beried 6 persons.

Parker later added these remarks:

Tuck what is called Meeks cutoff - a bad cutoff for all that tuck it.

Meek continued on ahead of the company, and when he reached Sherars Falls on the Deschutes River he was warned that a father who lost two sons along the trail intended to kill him, so with the help of Native Americans a rope was sent across the swift river, and both Meek and his wife were guided through the water with ropes tied around them. They hurried to the Mission at The Dalles where they convinced Black Harris, a mountain man, to return to the falls with a crew and equipment to help the emigrants cross. In this way Meek made his escape, and the rescue crew arrived in time to help the pioneers, who numbered more than a thousand, cross with their wagons. The wagons were taken completely apart to facilitate the dangerous crossing. Some of the emigrants crossed from the low banks, using their wagon box as a boat and guided by ropes over the swift current. Others used a rope and pulley system above the high walls of the narrows about two miles (three point two kilometres) downstream. It took nearly two weeks to cross everyone in the wagon train. The starving and exhausted emigrants finally reached The Dalles beginning around the 2nd week of October, having suffered 23 known deaths and probably many more.

It is estimated that another 25 of the exhausted emigrants died after reaching The Dalles. The deaths and other circumstances created resentment towards Meek and led to the often used phrase "Meek deserted them in the desert," despite his having stayed with his emigrants throughout most of the journey.

The Meek Cutoff is one of sixteen historic trails recognized by the State of Oregon. The blazing of the Meek Cutoff led to later wagon roads and the settlement of the eastern and central regions of Oregon.

== Notable members of the party ==
- Charlotte Moffett Cartwright
- James Terwilliger
- William G. T'Vault

== See also ==
- Huntington Wagon Road
- Meek's Cutoff, 2010 film
