= Huntington Wagon Road =

Coordinates: 44.1365670°N 121.2234910°W

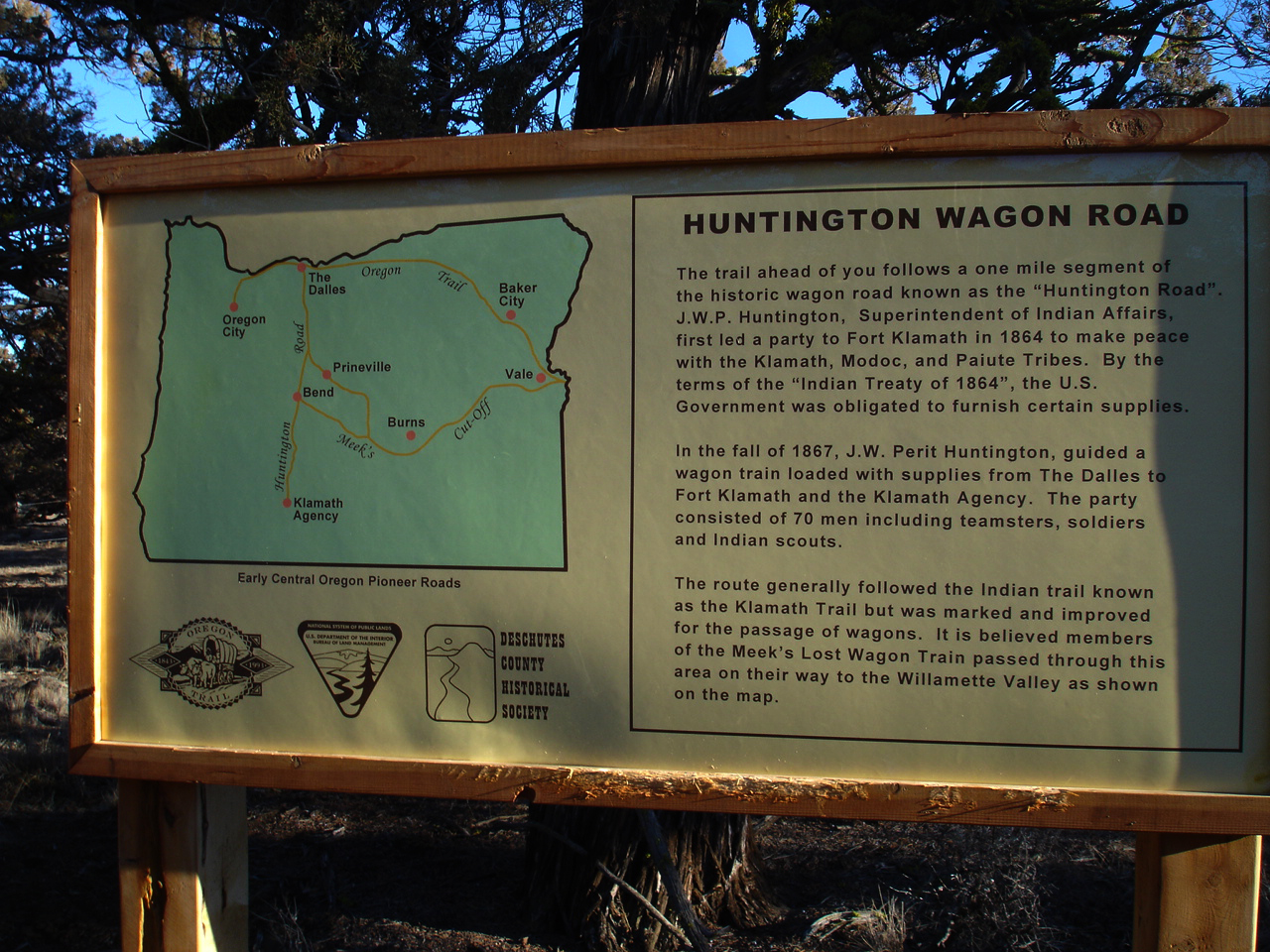
Historical information sign at the beginning of the trail

The Huntington Wagon Road is a historic road in Deschutes County, Oregon, United States.

About halfway between Bend and Redmond, Oregon, is a roughly one-square-mile parcel of public land where a section of the historic Huntington Road wagon trail has been preserved. The parcel is managed by the Prineville district of the Bureau of Land Management (BLM). At the beginning of the trail, which is closed to all motor vehicles, is a sign posted by the Deschutes County Historical Society that provides the following information:

Before you lies a one mile segment of historic wagon road known as the "Huntington Road". In 1864, J. W. Perit Huntington, Oregon Superintendent of Indian Affairs, guided a party to Fort Klamath to make peace with the Klamath, Modoc and some of the Paiute tribes. A peace treaty was signed, and the Klamath Reservation was established in 1866 with headquarters at Klamath Agency. By the terms of the "Indian Treaty of 1864", the U.S. government was required to provide the Indians with certain supplies. In the fall of 1867, Huntington guided a wagon train loaded with supplies from The Dalles to Fort Klamath, creating the Huntington Road. The party consisted of 70 men including teamsters, soldiers and Indian scouts. It is probable that members of the Lost Meek Wagon Train passed over this portion of the Huntington Road in 1845 as they crossed the juniper desert on their way to the Willamette Valley.

== See also ==
- Oregon Historic Trails Advisory Council
