= Meek's Cutoff (film) =

2010 film

- Theatrical release poster
- Directed by: Kelly Reichardt
- Screenplay by: Jonathan Raymond
- Produced by: Elizabeth Cuthrell; Neil Kopp; Anish Savjani; David Urrutia
- Starring: Michelle Williams; Bruce Greenwood; Will Patton; Zoe Kazan; Paul Dano; Shirley Henderson; Neal Huff; Tommy Nelson; Rod Rondeaux
- Cinematography: Chris Blauvelt
- Edited by: Kelly Reichardt
- Music by: Jeff Grace
- Production companies: Evenstar Films; FilmScience; Harmony Productions; Primitive Nerd
- Distributed by: Oscilloscope Laboratories
- Release dates: September 4, 2010 (Venice); April 8, 2011 (U.S.)
- Running time: 104 minutes
- Country: United States
- Languages: English; Downriver Nez Perce
- Budget: $2 million
- Box office: $1.2 million

Meek's Cutoff is a 2010 American Western historical survival film directed by Kelly Reichardt and starring Michelle Williams, Bruce Greenwood, Paul Dano, Zoe Kazan, Will Patton, Shirley Henderson, Neal Huff, Tommy Nelson, and Rod Rondeaux. The story is loosely based on a historical incident on the Oregon Trail in 1845, in which frontier guide Stephen Meek led a wagon train on an ill-fated journey through the Oregon High Desert along the route later known as the Meek Cutoff in the western United States.

The film was shown in competition at the 67th Venice International Film Festival. The film is formatted in the Academy ratio (1.37:1), a standard used in many classic Westerns.

== Plot ==
A small group of settlers traveling across the Oregon High Desert in 1845 suspect that their guide, Stephen Meek, may not know the area well enough to plot a safe and certain route. A journey that was supposed to take two weeks, via what became known as the Meek Cutoff, stretches into five. With no clear sense of where they are going, tensions rise as water and food run low. The wives look on, unable to participate in the decision making, as their husbands discuss how long they should continue to follow Meek.

The dynamics of power shift when they capture a Cayuse man and hold him in the hope he will lead them to a source of water, despite Meek's wish to kill him at once. Meek argues that the man cannot be trusted, but the group by now have no confidence in Meek. Later, when Meek prepares to shoot the captive, Emily Tetherow intervenes. In the end, after the group encounters the positive sign of a tree, Meek submits to majority opinion. The fate of the group is left ambiguous as the Cayuse man continues to walk on.

== Cast ==
- Michelle Williams as Emily Tetherow
- Bruce Greenwood as Stephen Meek
- Will Patton as Solomon Tetherow
- Zoe Kazan as Millie Gately
- Paul Dano as Thomas Gately
- Shirley Henderson as Glory White
- Neal Huff as William White
- Tommy Nelson as Jimmy White
- Rod Rondeaux as The Indian

== Production ==
=== Development ===
Writer-director Kelly Reichardt developed the film with screenwriter Jonathan Raymond, with whom she had collaborated on her previous feature, Wendy and Lucy (2008). Through historical research, Raymond had become acquainted with the story of fur trapper Stephen Meek, who led a group of travelers on an ill-fated journey along the Oregon Trail in 1845.

Describing her goal with the film, she commented: "I wanted to give a different view of the west from the usual series of masculine encounters and battles of strength, and to present this idea of going west as just a trance of walking." In preparation for filming, Reichardt researched extant journals and diaries of women who embarked on the Oregon Trail.

=== Filming ===
Principal photography took place in late 2009 in rural central Oregon. During filming, the cast and crew stayed in the city of Burns. Actress Shirley Henderson recalled that the natural elements posed a number of issues during the filming process: "There were quite difficult conditions. The landscape dictates everything, we had snow and really intense dust storms, I've never seen anything like that before. Where we were filming was a couple of hours drive into the desert each day so you lose the light quickly. We were against time; there wasn't the luxury of extra days. There's a limited amount of film stock because we're on a budget, so there's a pressure there, you can feel that."

To help the actors prepare for the shoot, Reichardt set up a pioneer camp in the desert for the actors to spend time in and become accustomed to the demands of 19th-century chores and upkeep in the wilderness.

== Reception ==
=== Box office ===
The film was given a limited theatrical release in the United States on April 8, 2011 through Oscilloscope Laboratories, and grossed $20,024 during its opening weekend in two theaters. The release expanded to a total of 45 theaters, grossing $977,772 domestically. It earned an additional $227,485 in international markets, making for a worldwide box-office gross of $1,205,257.

=== Critical response ===
Review aggregator Rotten Tomatoes gave the film an 86% approval rating based on reviews from 130 critics, with an average score of 7.5/10. It reported the consensus: "Moving at a contemplative speed unseen in most westerns, Meek's Cutoff is an effective, intense journey of terror and survival in the untamed frontier." At Metacritic, which assigns a weighted average score out of 100 to reviews from mainstream critics, the film received an average score of 85 based on 36 reviews.

Peter Bradshaw of The Guardian praised the film, writing: "There is a comparable sense of an embattled, frightened expeditionary force, out of food and water, and ideas: without the experience, resources or language to understand someone who may be their destroyer or their only hope of survival. This superbly made, austere film is Reichardt's best yet... and a powerful new addition to the western genre."

A number of critics praised the film for its realistic depiction of settlers of the period attempting to survive the harsh natural conditions of the American west. Among them were critic Roger Ebert, who gave the movie 3.5 stars out of 4 and noted: "To set aside its many other accomplishments, Meek's Cutoff is the first film I've seen that evokes what must have been the reality of wagon trains to the West. They were grueling, dirty, thirsty, burning and freezing ordeals." Henry Cabot Beck of True West Magazine made similar observation, summarizing: "The film is smart and haunting, and, if nothing else, it's probably more accurate in its depiction of the tedium and uncertainty of daily life and survival in a struggling wagon train than anything ever seen on screen."

In July 2025, it ranked number 51 on Rolling Stone's list of "The 100 Best Movies of the 21st Century."
