= Warm Springs Reservoir =

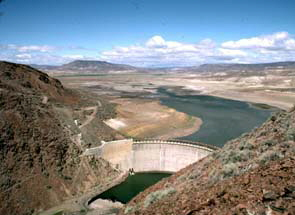
- Warm Springs Dam and Reservoir

- Location within Oregon Location within the United States
- Location: Harney / Malheur counties, Oregon, United States
- Coordinates: 43°35′08″N 118°12′32″W
- Type: Reservoir
- Primary inflows: Malheur River
- Primary outflows: Malheur River
- Catchment area: 1,059.5 mi^{2} (2,744.1 km^{2})
- Basin countries: United States
- Built: 1919
- Max. length: 8.5 mi (14 km)
- Max. width: 1.3 mi (2.1 km)
- Surface area: 4,194 acres (1,697 ha)
- Average depth: 68 ft (21 m)
- Max. depth: 140 ft (42.7 m)
- Water volume: 169,714 acre⋅ft (209,339 dam^{3})
- Residence time: 2.2 years
- Shore length^{1}: 34.5 mi (55.5 km)
- Surface elevation: 3,406 ft (1,038 m)
- ^{1} Shore length is not a well-defined measure.

Warm Springs Reservoir is a reservoir on the boundary between Harney and Malheur counties in the U.S. state of Oregon. It is located 13 miles (21 km) southwest of Juntura at an elevation of 3,406 feet (1,038 m). The lake's primary inflow and outflow are both the Malheur River.

The 106-foot-tall (32 m) and 469-foot-long (143 m) thin-arch concrete Warm Springs Dam was built from 1918 to 1919 by the Warm Springs Irrigation District, and was later modified in 1930 and 1939 with the help of the United States Bureau of Reclamation. It was constructed from 19,500 cubic yards (14,900 m^{3}) of material on top of a series of olivine basalt lava flows. The resultant 8.5-by-1.3-mile (14 by 2.1 km) reservoir has a maximum area of 4,194 acres (1,697 ha), a maximum volume of 169,714 acre-feet (209,339 dam^{3}), and a maximum depth of 140 feet (42.7 m). It has a shore length of about 34.5 miles (55.5 km) and a residence time of about 2.2 years.

Warm Springs Reservoir's watershed covers approximately 1,059.5 square miles (2,744.1 km^{2}) of eastern Oregon. It receives an average precipitation of 17.5 inches (444 mm). As of the 2000 Census, there were 157 people living within the watershed's boundaries.

The predominant wildlife in the region is mule deer and various waterfowl. Bass, bluegill, and rainbow trout are the main fish found in the reservoir. The reservoir is classified as eutrophic, with a transparency of about 3.3 feet (1.0 m).

== See also ==
- List of lakes in Oregon
