= Oregon Historic Trails Advisory Council =

The Oregon Historic Trails Advisory Council is an agency of the U.S. state of Oregon that oversees and provides advice on Oregon's sixteen historic trails, which include trails used in the 19th century by explorers and pioneer emigrants to the region as well as trails associated with the original Native American inhabitants. The council, a division of the Oregon State Parks and Recreation Department, was created by the executive order of Governor Kitzhaber in 1998 and consists of nine volunteer members.

== History ==
In 1984, an Oregon Trail Advisory Council was formed by executive order of Governor Atiyeh. In 1988, the council published Our Oregon Trail: A Report to the Governor. In December 1990, Governor Roberts responded to the report by supporting the founding of the Oregon Trail Coordinating Council (OTCC) as an independent nonprofit corporation, and called on the council to plan activities for the 1993 Oregon Trail sesquicentennial celebration. The OTCC had anticipated dissolving after the commemoration, but the sesquicentennial highlighted the success of its programs and the state continued to support the group while expanding its mandate to include other Oregon historic trails, so the OTCC postponed its dissolution until at least 1995. The same year, the state legislature passed the Oregon Historic Trails Bill, which provided for the OTCC and the Oregon State Parks and Recreation Department to enter into a cooperative agreement to develop a statewide historic trails program and recognized the "value and significance" of sixteen trails in Oregon. During the 1997 legislative session, however, a bill was passed that included a provision terminating the manufacture of the specialty Oregon Trail commemorative license plates that had been authorized in 1993 and 1995 to provide funding for the council. Faced with a shortage of funds, in 1998 the OTCC transferred its financial assets to the Oregon Community Foundation, establishing the Oregon Historic Trails Fund, which continues to support programs related to Oregon's historic trails.

After seeing that the dissolution of the OTCC would create the need for a statewide advisory body to "continue to recognize the value and significance of Oregon’s historic trails as outlined in ORS 358.057", Governor Kitzhaber took the recommendation of the OTCC to reactivate of the Oregon Trail Advisory Council, which was renamed the Oregon Historic Trails Advisory Council.

== Trails ==
These sixteen trails were designated as historic by the Oregon State Legislature, as provided in the Oregon Revised Statutes (ORS 358.057).

=== National Historic Trails ===
- The Lewis and Clark National Historic Trail
- The Oregon National Historic Trail
- The Applegate Trail
- The Nez Perce National Historic Trail

=== Alternate routes of the Oregon Trail ===
- The Whitman Mission Route
- The Upper Columbia River Route
- The Meek Cutoff
- The Free Emigrant Road
- The Cutoff to the Barlow Road

=== Other Oregon routes ===
- The Klamath Trail
- The Jedediah Smith Route
- The Nathaniel Wyeth Route
- The Benjamin Bonneville Route
- The Ewing Young Route
- The John Frémont Route
- The Santiam Wagon Road

== See also ==
- National Historic Trail
- Oregon Trail Memorial Association
- Oregon-California Trails Association
