= Malheur River =

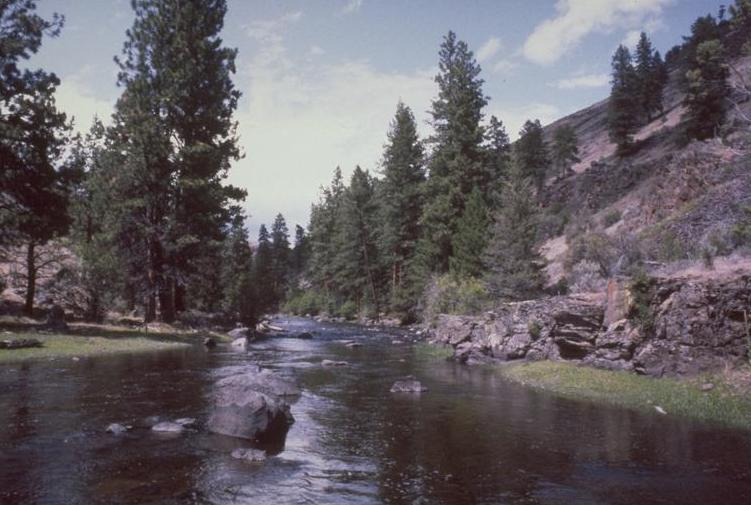
- Malheur River flowing through Harney County

- Location of the mouth of the Malheur River in Oregon
- Etymology: From the French malheur (bad fortune), applied by French Canadian hunters whose cache of furs near the river were stolen

Location
- Country: United States
- State: Oregon
- County: Malheur, Harney, Grant

Physical characteristics
- Source: Blue Mountains
  - location: Grant County, Oregon
  - coordinates: 44°8′5″N 118°37′14″W
- Mouth: Snake River
  - location: Malheur County, Oregon
  - coordinates: 44°3′33″N 116°58′31″W
  - elevation: 2,133 ft (650 m)
- Length: 190 mi (310 km)
- Basin size: 4,700 sq mi (12,000 km^{2})
- Discharge
  - location: near Vale, Oregon
  - average: 203 cu ft/s (5.7 m^{3}/s)
  - minimum: 0 cu ft/s (0 m^{3}/s)
  - maximum: 20,800 cu ft/s (590 m^{3}/s)

Basin features
- Tributaries
  - left: North Fork Malheur River, Bully Creek, Willow Creek
  - right: South Fork Malheur River

National Wild and Scenic River
- Type: Wild, Scenic
- Designated: October 28, 1988

The Malheur River (/ˈmælhjʊər/ MAL-hure) is a 190-mile-long (306 km) tributary of the Snake River in eastern Oregon in the United States. It drains a high desert area, between the Harney Basin, the Blue Mountains and the Snake.

In the past Malheur Lake (located in the enclosed Harney Basin to the southwest) outflowed into the river.

== Course ==
The Malheur River rises in the southern Blue Mountains of southern Grant County, south of Strawberry Mountain in the Strawberry Mountain Wilderness. It flows south through Malheur National Forest, then southeast past Drewsey and through Warm Springs Reservoir. At Riverside in western Malheur County, it receives the South Fork Malheur River from the south, then turns sharply back northward to Juntura, where it receives the North Fork Malheur River from the north. From Juntura it flows generally east past Vale, joining the Snake from the west approximately two miles (3 km) north of Ontario, Oregon. The mouth of the Malheur River is approximately at Snake river mile (RM) 370 or river kilometer (RK) 600.

== History ==
The name of the river is derived from the French for "misfortune". The name was attached to the river by French Canadian voyageur trappers working for the North West Company on the Snake County Expeditions of Donald Mackenzie as early as 1818 for the unfortunate circumstance that some beaver furs they had cached there were snatched by Indigenous people. The name first appears in the record in 1826 when Peter Skene Ogden, a fur trapper with the Hudson's Bay Company, referred to it as "River au Malheur (from rivière au Malheur, literally: River of the Misfortune") and thereafter as "Unfortunate River".

The river lived up to its name a second time in 1845, when mountain man Stephen Meek, seeking a faster route along the Oregon Trail, led a migrant party up the river valley into the high desert along a route that has since become known as the Meek Cutoff. After leaving the river valley, the party was unable to find a water supply and lost 23 people by the time they reached The Dalles on the Columbia River; gold was found, also see Lost Blue Bucket Mine.

In 1853, 1854 and 1859 the river was used more successfully as the route of the Elliott Cutoff. The emigrants followed the ruts of Stephen Meek until they reached Harney Basin. From here they sought more direct routes to the Deschutes River, where they turned south until reaching the Free Emigrant Road. The road was built over the Cascades through Willamette Pass and brought emigrants into Central Oregon.

== River modifications ==
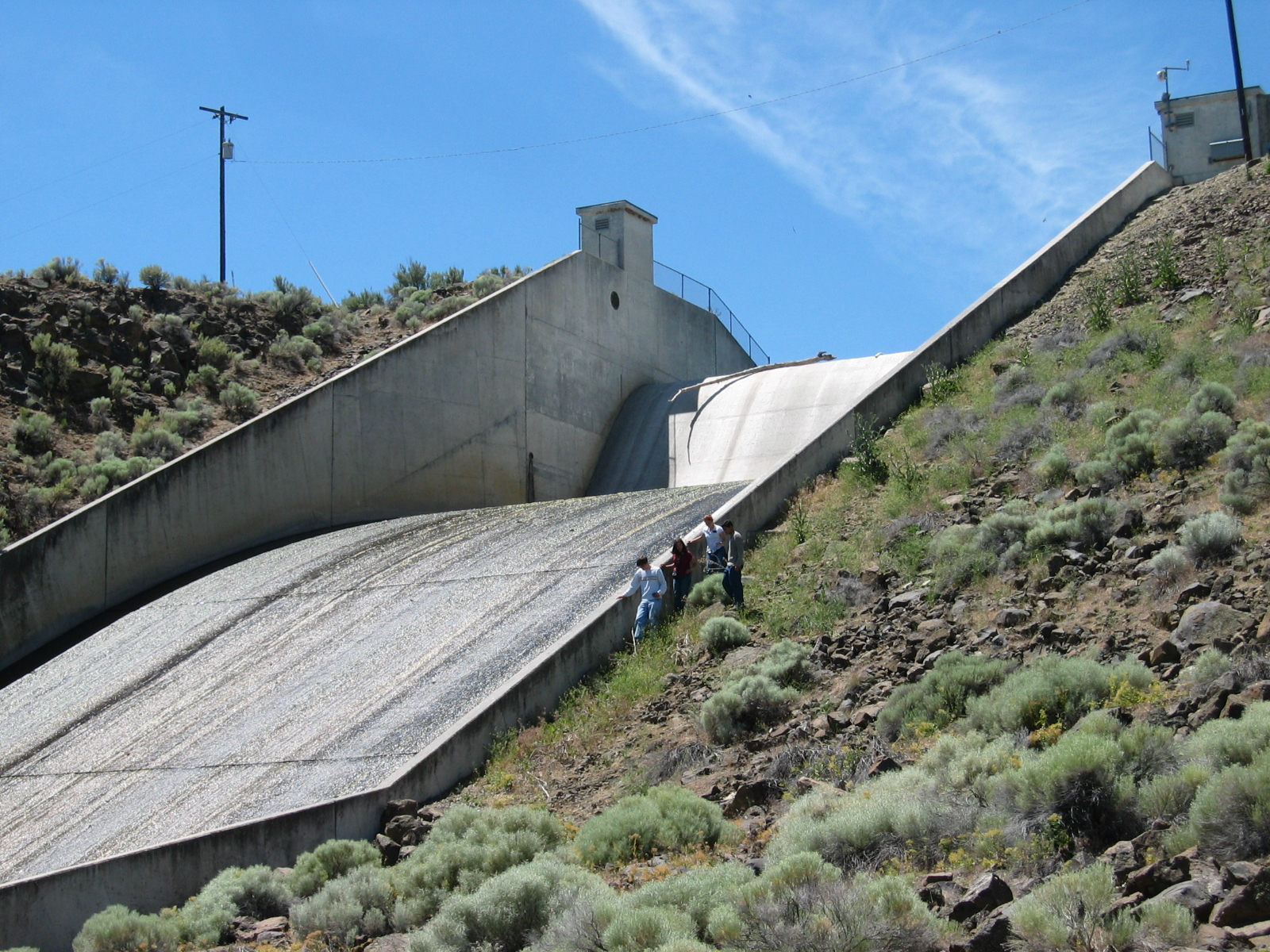
Bully Creek Dam in height perspective with human subjects

The lower Malheur River is used for irrigation in the agricultural potato-growing in the Snake River Plain along the Idaho-Oregon border.

There are approximately 370 miles (600 km) of irrigation-related canals and ditches in the lower basin of the Malheur River and its tributary Willow Creek. The streamflow of the Malheur and its tributaries is heavily influenced by a complex system of irrigation diversions, siphons, and canals, which begin near Malheur river mile 65, near Namorf and Harper, Oregon. This irrigation system extends downstream to the mouth of the Malheur at Ontario, Oregon. Irrigation is used on about 132,000 acres (530 km^{2}) within the Malheur River basin. The irrigation system is part of the Bureau of Reclamation's Vale Project, which includes a number of water impoundments, the largest of which are Warm Springs Reservoir on the mainstem Malheur River, Beulah Reservoir on the North Fork Malheur, Bully Creek Reservoir on Bully Creek, and Malheur Reservoir on Willow Creek. The project is operated and maintained by the Vale-Oregon Irrigation District.

Agricultural runoff has resulted in a phosphorus pollution problem in its lower reaches.

== Natural history ==
The Malheur River watershed was once a major spawning ground for anadromous fish such as salmon. In the early 20th century a number of dams on the Snake River blocked fish migration.

== Protected area ==
A 13.7-mile (22.0 km) segment of the Malheur River from Bosenberg Creek to the Malheur National Forest boundary became protected as wild and scenic in 1988 as part of the National Wild and Scenic Rivers System. The protected area includes 3,758 acres (15.21 km^{2}) of land along the river.

== See also ==
- List of longest streams of Oregon
- List of National Wild and Scenic Rivers
- List of rivers of Oregon
