= Lost Blue Bucket Mine =

Lost mine reputed to be in Oregon, United States

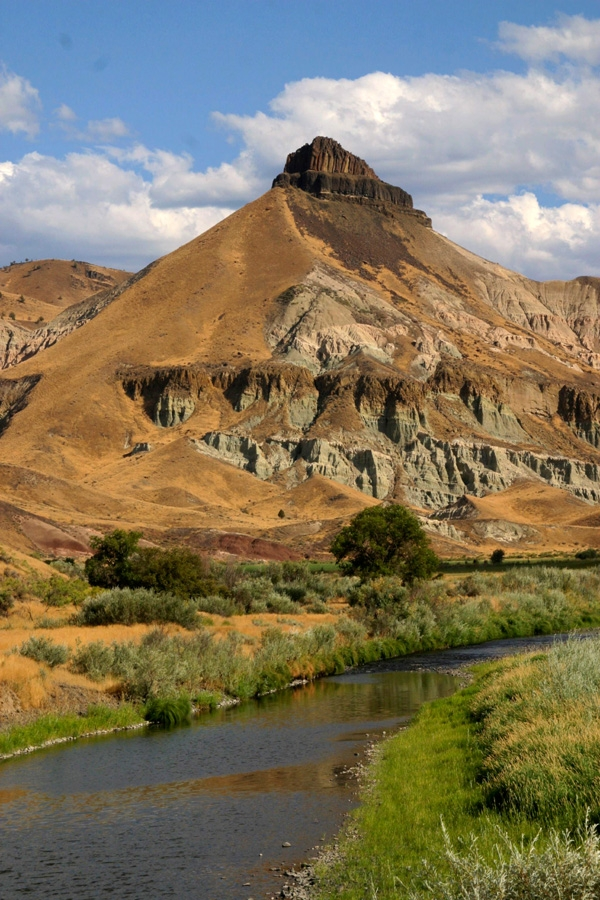
The John Day River passing by Sheep Rock in the John Day Fossil Beds National Monument; the mine is thought to be near the John Day River

The Lost Blue Bucket Mine is a lost mine reputed to be located along the Meek Wagon Train trail between the present day cities of Vale and The Dalles in Oregon, United States. Its discovery traces back to 1845, several years before the start of the California Gold Rush (1848–1855).

== The legend ==
=== Points of agreement ===
The various versions of the legend tend to agree on a few key points:

1. Lost Oregon-bound emigrants discovered the mine in summer 1845,
2. The deposit is coarse placer gold in a dry stream bed or canyon,
3. The canyon is bottomed with lava pocked with cavities and potholes.

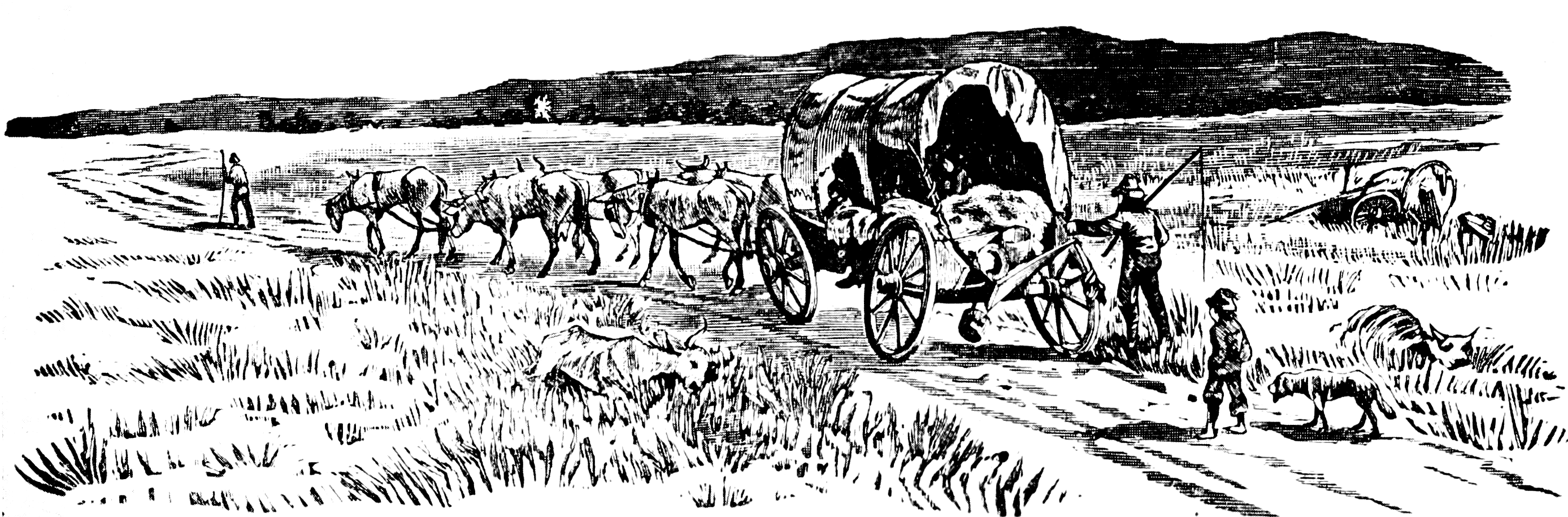
A drawing of a pioneer covered wagon

=== Versions of the legend ===
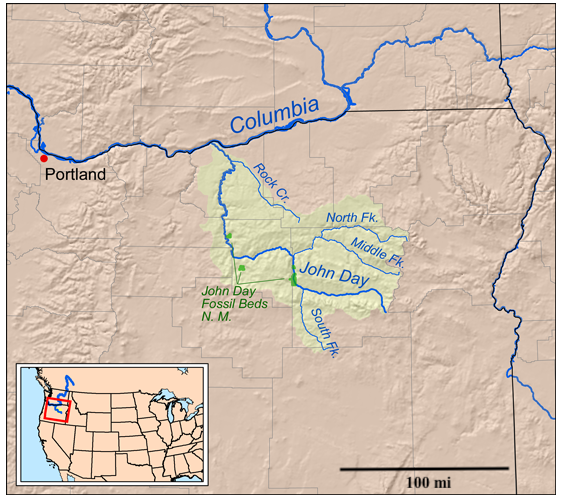
The watershed of Oregon's John Day River

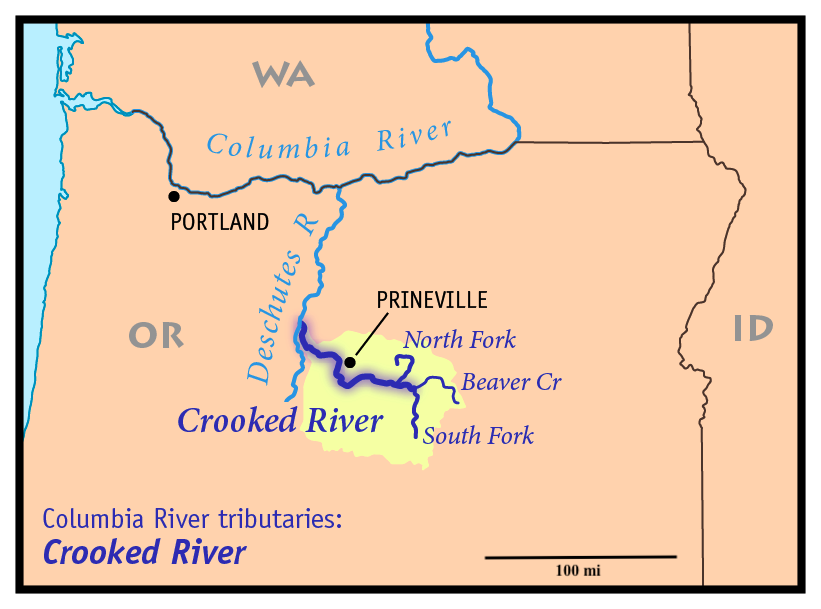
The watershed of Oregon's Crooked River

One version states that a wagon train got lost off the Meek Cutoff of the Oregon Trail, near the Malheur River. Three young men (or boys, or a single girl — accounts vary) went to fetch water, and while doing so put some shiny rocks into a blue bucket. Older members of the party said it was copper. Someone asked, "Was there much of it?" One replied, "We could have filled one of these blue buckets". This was 1845, before the California Gold Rush, and back then many could not recognize gold. A Mrs. Fisher kept one nugget and left the rest behind. The wagons eventually reached what is now The Dalles, Oregon in October, 1845. The single nugget was eventually recognized as gold.

Another version holds that when the Stephen Meek Wagon train stopped along the trail in present-day Crook County near Bear Creek, children went to gather water at some distance from the camp. They returned with a blue bucket filled with shiny pebbles. An old-timer in the party stated that the pebbles were made of copper. One of the families, however, kept several of the pebbles as souvenirs. Years later, and after having moved to California, the family came across the pebbles in a dresser drawer. By this time, the California Gold Rush had occurred, and the expertise was available to recognize that the pebbles were in fact gold. However, no one could remember the precise location where the pebbles had been found.

== Results ==
The legend sparked a gold rush to the area of modern-day Baker City, Oregon.

== Current status ==
If the mine existed, its location is unknown; the area comprises perhaps 40,000 square miles (100,000 km^{2}). It is believed to be on a tributary of the John Day River, or in another version, on a Bear Creek tributary of the Crooked River. There are three real mines in the U.S. named the "Blue Bucket", including one in Grant County, Oregon, that are unrelated to the lost mine.
