= Stephen Meek =

Fur trapper and guide in the American Old West

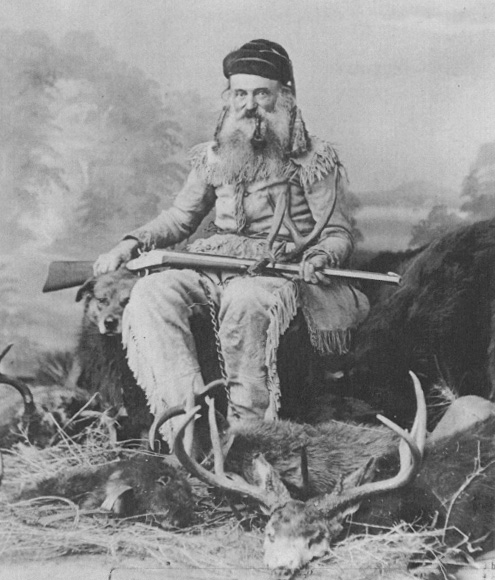
- Born: July 4, 1807; Washington County, Virginia
- Died: January 8, 1889 (aged 81); Etna, California
- Occupations: Trapper, Guide
- Spouse: Elizabeth Schoonover

Stephen Hall L. Meek (July 4, 1807 – January 8, 1889) was a fur trapper and guide in the American west, most notably a guide on a large wagon train that used a trail known as the Meek Cutoff. A native of Virginia, both he and his younger brother Joseph Meek would spend their lives as trappers west of the Rocky Mountains.

== Early years ==
Stephen Meek was born in Washington County, Virginia on July 4, 1807. In his autobiography, he claims to be a relative of President James K. Polk, and the claim is corroborated by his brother. He was educated in the local public schools in Virginia before beginning work for William Sublette in 1827. He began working as a laborer for Sublette's Rocky Mountain Fur Company in St. Louis, Missouri. Soon, however, he became a trapper for a variety of companies.

== American West ==
Meek joined an expedition with Benjamin Bonneville in 1831 as a trapper while Bonneville was exploring the Great Salt Lake. From 1833 to 1834, he traveled to California with Joseph R. Walker. Meek moved to the Oregon Country in 1835 and began working at the Hudson's Bay Company's Fort Vancouver for John McLoughlin. This included trips to California with Thomas McKay.

In 1841, Meek bought the first lot of the Oregon City, Oregon, townsite from John McLoughlin, and helped to survey the land. He joined the American mountaineers that year for one year. The following year, he served as a guide for a wagon train of pioneers to the Willamette Valley from Fort Laramie, and in 1845 led the ill-fated group that followed him from the Oregon Trail on the Meek Cutoff. That party split at Fort Hall from the main party that included Joel Palmer and Sam Barlow. In May 1845, he married Elizabeth Schoonover at St. Louis, Missouri. They had one son, George. The Meeks would reside at Linn City, Oregon, until 1848.

== Later years ==
Meek would later spend time in the mines of the California Gold Rush before settling in Siskiyou County, California. In 1850, he briefly returned to the Oregon Territory, before returning to California, continuing to mine until 1865. In 1865, Elizabeth died, and he returned to working as a guide and trapper. Stephen Meek died in Etna, California, on January 8, 1889, at the age of 81.

Pop Culture

Stephen Meek is always the points leader on the leader board in the computer game: Oregon Trail.

He was portrayed by actor Bruce Greenwood in the 2010 Western film Meek's Cutoff.

== See also ==
- Harney Basin
- Lost Blue Bucket Mine
- Malheur River
- Meek's Cutoff, a film about the cutoff trail
