= Wagontire Mountain =

Mountain in Oregon, United States

Coordinates: 43.34882°N 119.89152°W

Wagontire Mountain is a summit in the U.S. state of Oregon. With an elevation of 6,440 feet (1,960 m), Wagontire Mountain is the 435th highest summit in the state of Oregon.

Wagontire Mountain was named for a historical claim that early pioneers reported seeing an old covered wagon tire nearby.

The unincorporated community of Wagontire was named after the mountain.
