= Silvies River =

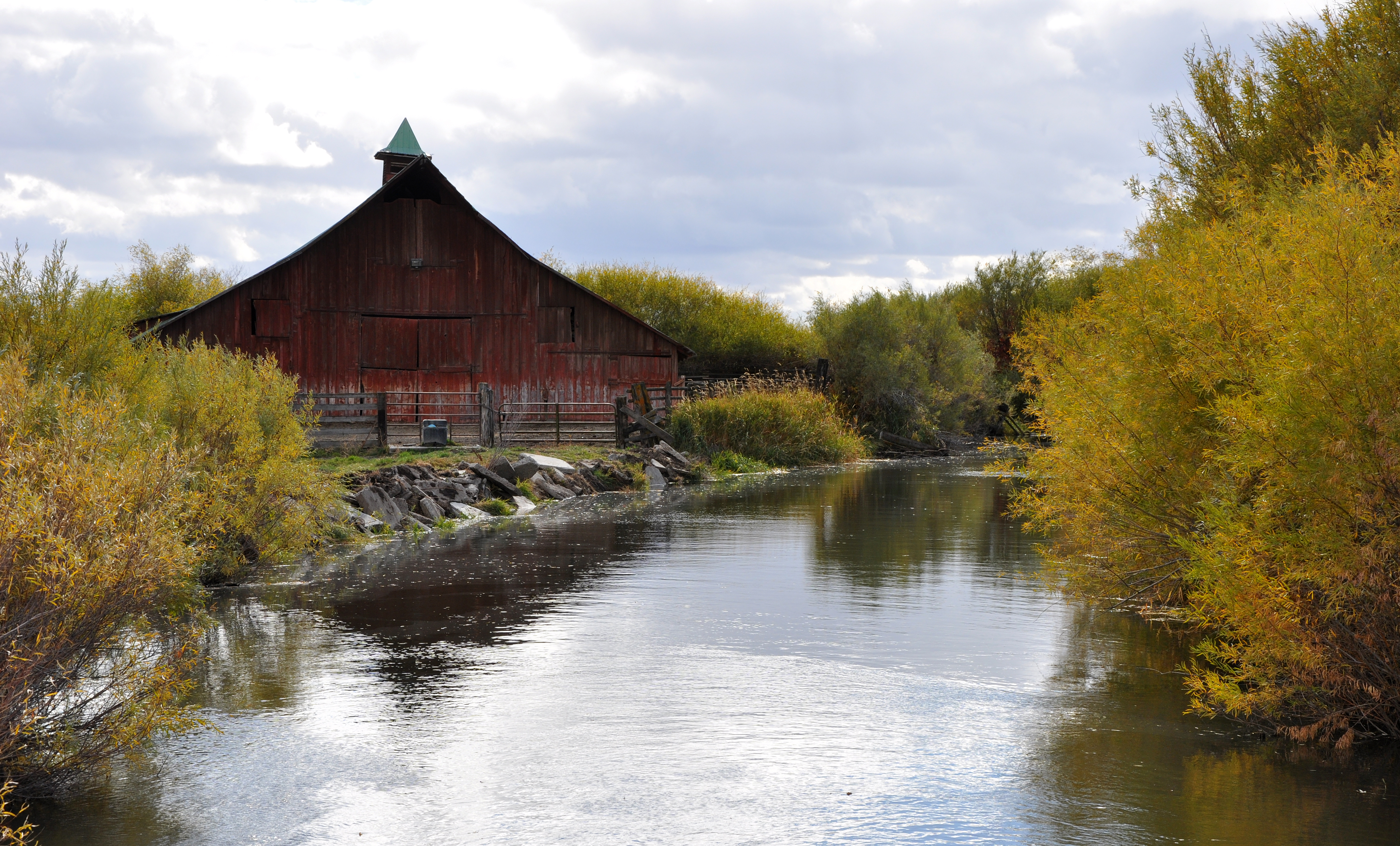
- View from Oregon Route 78 bridge near Burns

- Location of the mouth of Silvies River in Oregon

Location
- Country: United States
- State: Oregon
- County: Grant and Harney

Physical characteristics
- Source: Aldrich Mountains
  - location: Grant County
  - coordinates: 44°07′19″N 119°13′53″W
  - elevation: 5,598 ft (1,706 m)
- Mouth: East Fork and West Fork distributaries
  - location: south of Burns, Harney County
  - coordinates: 43°34′05″N 119°02′04″W
  - elevation: 4,150 ft (1,260 m)
- Length: 119 mi (192 km)
- Basin size: 1,273 sq mi (3,300 km^{2})
- Discharge
  - location: above diversions on the lower river
  - average: 185 cu ft/s (5.2 m^{3}/s)

The Silvies River flows for about 119 miles (192 km) through Grant and Harney counties in the U.S. state of Oregon. The river drains 1,273 square miles (3,300 km^{2}) of the northern Harney Basin.

The headwaters are on the southern flank of the Aldrich Mountains, about 10 miles (16 km) south of Mount Vernon in Grant County. Named tributaries include Bear Creek and Emigrant Creek. The Silvies runs generally southward and passes near Seneca and Burns. Southeast of Burns, in Harney County, the river splits into two distributaries, the East Fork Silvies River and the West Fork Silvies River. Both terminate at Malheur Lake about 25 miles (40 km) southeast of Burns.

Flowing mainly through private land with limited public access, the river supports populations of redband trout, especially on its upstream reaches. Downstream of Seneca, fish such as smallmouth bass, yellow perch, and carp are more abundant. The pool behind Five-Mile Dam, about 5 miles (8 km) north of Burns, is used for swimming, canoeing, and fishing.

== See also ==
- List of rivers of Oregon
- List of longest streams of Oregon
- Malheur National Wildlife Refuge

== Works cited ==
- Sheehan, Madelynne Diness (2005). Fishing in Oregon: The Complete Oregon Fishing Guide, 10th edition. Scappoose, Oregon: Flying Pencil Publications. ISBN 978-0-916473-15-0.
