= Dry River (Crooked River tributary) =

- Location of the mouth of Dry River in Oregon

Location
- Country: United States
- State: Oregon
- County: Deschutes and Crook counties,

Physical characteristics
- Source: near Hampton Buttes
  - location: Deschutes County, Oregon
  - coordinates: 43°46′56″N 120°16′44″W
  - elevation: 5,886 ft (1,794 m)
- Mouth: Crooked River (Oregon)
  - location: west of Prineville, Crook County, Oregon
  - coordinates: 44°20′10″N 121°02′50″W
  - elevation: 2,782 ft (848 m)
- Length: 88 mi (142 km)
- Basin size: 752 sq mi (1,950 km^{2})

The Dry River is an intermittent tributary, 88 miles (142 km) long, of the Crooked River in the U.S. state of Oregon. The stream arises near Hampton Buttes north of Hampton and U.S. Route 20 between Brothers and Riley in the Oregon High Desert. Beginning in eastern Deschutes County near its border with Crook County, it flows generally northwest along the Deschutes–Crook county line, crossing briefly into Crook County before turning slightly south and returning to Deschutes County. Along these upper reaches, it flows roughly parallel to the highway, under which it passes several times before turning sharply north near the Horse Ridge Research Natural Area, 19 miles (31 km) southeast of Bend. Continuing north and re-entering Crook County, it passes under Powell Butte Highway, Oregon Route 126 (Ochoco Highway), and Oregon Route 370 (O'Neil Highway) before entering the Crooked River 34 miles (55 km) from the larger stream's confluence with the Deschutes River.

Oregon Geographic Names says that the dry channel of the river, which runs in places between walls of basalt, is clearly marked for more than 50 miles (80 km), from the west end of the desert to the Crooked River. Dry River Canyon, a deeply incised stretch of the river bed near Millican, is used as a hiking path, about 2.3 miles (3.7 km) long. The canyon was carved during the wetter climate of the Pleistocene epoch by water flowing from a now-vanished lake in the Millican Valley. Canyon walls in this stretch rise 300 feet (91 m) above the sandy bed of the river. Other sights include large boulders, juniper trees, and Native American petroglyphs.

== See also ==
- List of rivers of Oregon
- List of longest streams of Oregon
