= Crooked River Railroad Bridge =

Coordinates: 44.3911°N 121.1962°W

The Crooked River Railroad Bridge, part of a BNSF Railway line between the Columbia River and Bend, Oregon, crosses Oregon's Crooked River Canyon in southern Jefferson County. The bridge is 320 feet (98 m) above the river and when it was completed in 1911, it was the second-highest railroad bridge in the United States. It is a steel two-hinge arch span with a total length of 460 feet (140 m).

== History ==
The crossing of the Crooked River played a critical role in the competition to build a railroad up the Deschutes River Valley. The incentive for railroad construction was reaching the vast stands of timber south of Bend. The Oregon Trunk Railway Company, a subsidiary of the Spokane, Portland and Seattle Railway owned by James J. Hill of the Great Northern Railway, started up the west side of the Deschutes while the Des Chutes Railroad, owned by Edward Harriman of the Union Pacific, started up the east side. At North Junction, approximately 65 miles (105 km) south of the Columbia River, Hill's Oregon Trunk crossed over to the east bank. At 126 miles (203 km) both railroads would have had to cross a major tributary of the Deschutes, the Crooked River. There was only one place where the cliffs on both sides were close enough to build a bridge. Jim Hill had obtained the rights to the location when his Oregon Trunk Railroad acquired the Central Oregon Railroad Company on December 1, 1909. The Central Oregon had laid no track and the rights to the bridge site were its principal asset. Hill's acquisition of the location forced Harriman to negotiate a settlement whereby the Oregon Trunk, Hill's railroad, would own almost the entire line from the Columbia to Bend but Harriman's company would have the right to use the track.

Through a series of mergers the rail line and the bridge became part of the Burlington Northern and Santa Fe Railway (which changed its name to BNSF Railway in 2005). Union Pacific, Harriman's old railroad, still has the right to use the track. Great Northern extended the line south from Bend to Chemult in 1928.

The bridge was designed by the famous bridge architect, Ralph Modjeski, who also designed the San Francisco–Oakland Bay Bridge. The Missouri Valley Bridge & Iron Company built the bridge by cantilevering it out from rock walls on both sides of the canyon. A myth arose, fostered by a photograph of men climbing a rope ladder up to the bridge, that the bridge builders camped at the bottom of the canyon and climbed up to work every day. In fact the crew lived two miles north of the bridge in a large construction camp at Opal City. Opal City was expected to thrive well into the future but it was completely abandoned soon after the railroad was completed.

The first steel for the bridge arrived on May 18, 1911, and was lowered by derrick to the bottom of the gorge. Men climbed down rope ladders to attach cables to the steel beams and the steel was hoisted back up both sides of the canyon as the beams were needed. The first train crossed the bridge only four months later on September 17. Half the rivets holding the bridge together were installed after trains started using the bridge. The bridge was built quickly to facilitate laying the last 25.5 miles (41.0 km) of track to Bend where Jim Hill himself drove the "golden" spike on October 5. Dramatic photographs of the bridge's construction were taken by Olof Hedlund of Madras.

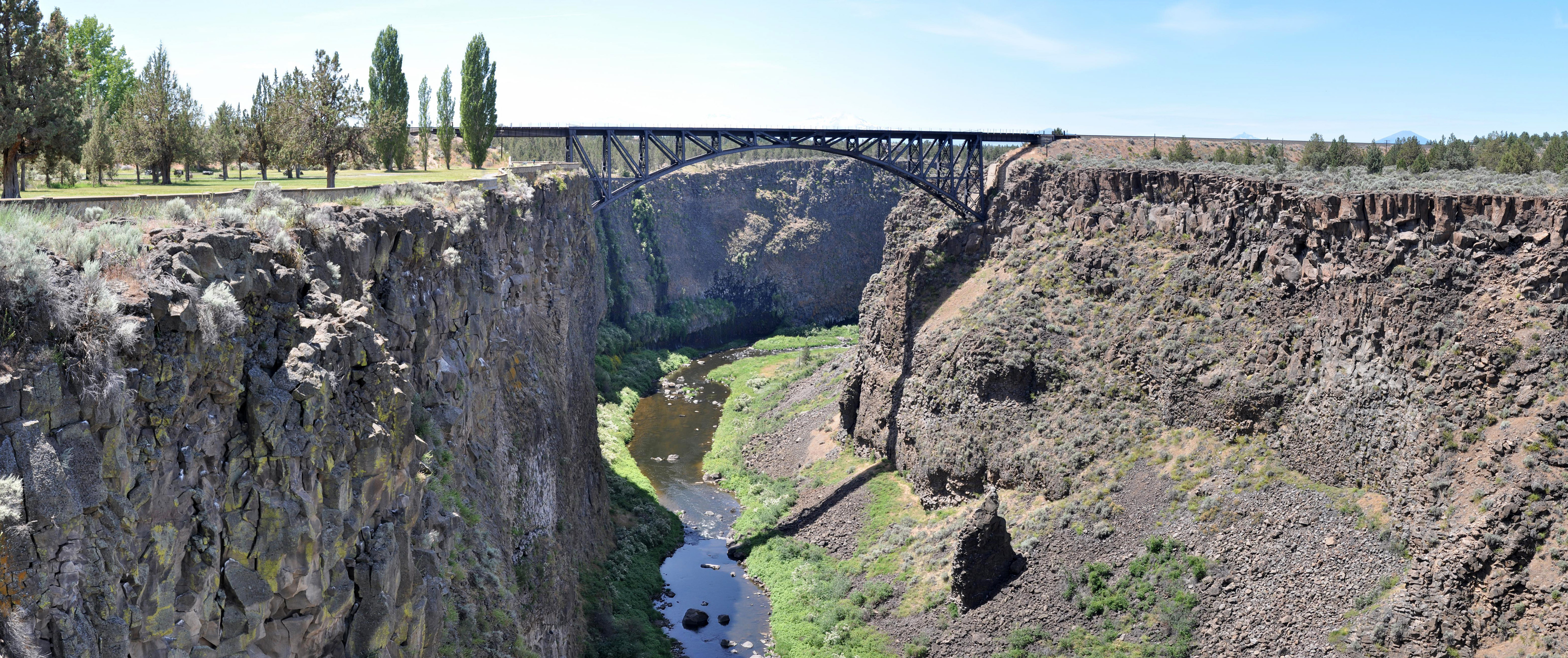
Crooked River Railroad Bridge spanning over the canyon at Peter Skene Ogden State Scenic Viewpoint

== Nearby bridges ==
Less than 1/4 mile (0.40 km) upriver from the bridge are the Crooked River High Bridge, the Rex T. Barber Veterans Memorial Bridge (which carries U.S. Route 97 over the Crooked River), and the Peter Skene Ogden State Scenic Viewpoint. Further upriver the City of Prineville Railway, linking Redmond and Prineville, operates the only other railroad bridge across the Crooked River.

== See also ==
- List of bridges documented by the Historic American Engineering Record in Oregon
