= Rex T. Barber =

USAAF and USAF officer (1917–2001)

- Official military photograph of Rex Barber
- Born: May 6, 1917; Culver, Oregon, U.S.
- Died: July 26, 2001 (aged 84); Terrebonne, Oregon, U.S.
- Burial place: Redmond Memorial Cemetery; Redmond, Oregon, U.S.
- Military career
- Allegiance: United States
- Branch: United States Army Air Forces; United States Air Force
- Service years: 1941–1961
- Rank: Colonel
- Conflicts: World War II (WIA): Guadalcanal campaign; Solomon Islands campaign; Operation Vengeance; Korean War
- Awards: Navy Cross; Silver Star (2); Purple Heart; Air Medal

Rex Theodore Barber Sr. (May 6, 1917 – July 26, 2001) was a World War II fighter pilot from the United States. He is best known as a member of Operation Vengeance, the top secret mission to intercept the aircraft carrying Japanese Admiral Isoroku Yamamoto in April 1943.

== Early life and education ==
Born and raised in Culver, Oregon, Barber's parents were Charlotte F. Barber and William C. Barber. He was a student at Linfield College and then Oregon State College in Corvallis; he majored in agricultural engineering from 1937 to 1940 before enlisting in the U.S. Army Air Corps in September 1940.

== Personal life ==
Barber married Margaret I. Smith (February 11, 1918 – April 26, 2005) at Tyndall Field on October 3, 1947. They had two sons, Rex Jr. and Richard.

== Career ==
Barber received his commission as a U.S. Army officer and his pilot's wings on October 31, 1941. He joined the 70th Pursuit Squadron, which arrived at Guadalcanal, Solomon Islands, in December 1942. Flying a Bell P-39 Airacobra, he scored his first victory by downing a Japanese bomber on the 28th. Upon transfer to the 339th Squadron, he began flying P-38 Lightnings and claimed two Zero fighters on April 7.

On April 18, Lieutenant Barber figured prominently in the Yamamoto interception, also known as Operation Vengeance. Intelligence sources had learned that Yamamoto would be flying in a "Betty" bomber on an inspection tour of Japanese bases in the northern Solomon Islands. Historian Donald P. Bourgeois credits Barber with the sole kill of Yamamoto's aircraft. In 1991, Barber and Captain Thomas George Lanphier Jr. were officially credited with half a kill each in Yamamoto's bomber after the Air Force reviewed the incident. Barber also shared a second Betty destroyed on the same mission.

In 2003, Barber was credited by the Governor and Legislature of Oregon with the sole kill after an inspection analyzed the crash site and determined the path of the bullet impacts, thereby validating Barber's account and invalidating Lanphier's claim. However, despite numerous appeals, the US Air Force refused to reverse its 1991 ruling giving each pilot half credit for the kill. Military historian Daniel L. Haulman, who was a member of the US Air Force panel that reviewed the case in 1985, stated in 2024 that after reviewing new evidence, "I have become convinced that, despite the panel decision and the subsequent Rice decision, credit for shooting down Yamamoto's plane really should go to Rex Barber."

After his tour of duty ended in June 1943, then-Captain Barber requested a return to combat. Late that year, he joined the 449th Fighter Squadron in China, still flying P-38s. He claimed three further Japanese planes probably destroyed and damaged, but he was shot down on his 139th mission, bailing out near Kiukiang on April 29. He was rescued by Chinese civilians, who treated his injuries and escorted him to safety five weeks later. At the end of the war, Barber attained the rank of major. He transferred to the newly established U.S. Air Force when it was established as an independent service in 1947 and commanded one of America's first jet fighter squadrons. He retired from the Air Force as a colonel in 1961.

== Decorations ==
=== Navy Cross ===

Citation:

The President of the United States of America takes pleasure in presenting the Navy Cross to First Lieutenant (Air Corps) Rex Theodore Barber (ASN: 0-429902), United States Army Air Forces, for extraordinary heroism while serving as Pilot of a P-38 fighter airplane in the 339th Fighter Squadron, 37th Fighter Group, THIRTEENTH Air Force, U.S. Army Air Forces, attached to a Marine Fighter Command in action against enemy Japanese forces in the Solomon Islands on 18 April 1943. Participating in a dangerously long interception flight, First Lieutenant Barber contacted a formation of two enemy bombers escorted by six fighters in a complete surprise approach. Quickly engaging the enemy, he pressed his tactical advantage and struck fiercely, destroying one Japanese bomber at such close range that fragments from the explosion lodged in the wings of his plane, and shooting down the escorting enemy fighter plane which had been attempting to divert the attack. His brilliant airmanship and determined fighting spirit throughout a daring and vital mission were in keeping with the highest traditions of the United States Armed Services.

=== Commendations ===
Barber was awarded the following awards over his military career, including the Veterans of Foreign Wars Gold Medal of Merit.

Badge	U.S. Army Air Forces Command Pilot Badge		
1st row	Navy Cross		Silver Star with 1 Oak leaf cluster
2nd row	Purple Heart	Air Medal	American Campaign Medal
3rd row	Asiatic–Pacific Campaign Medal with 2 Campaign stars	World War II Victory Medal	National Defense Service Medal with 1 Service star
4th row	Korean Service Medal	Air Force Longevity Service Award with 4 Oak leaf clusters	China War Memorial Medal (1941-1945)
5th row	Republic of Korea Presidential Unit Citation	United Nations Korea Medal	Korean War Service Medal

== Later life ==
Upon his retirement from the military, Barber returned to Culver, Oregon, and resided there for the next forty years. He worked as an insurance agent and, at different times, served the city of Culver as mayor and judge.

He was a strong supporter of Little League Baseball, and often helped out local youth. He was actively involved in service organizations until his death at his home in Terrebonne, Oregon. His son, Rex Jr., is quoted as saying that his "afterburner just flamed out on him."

== Legacy ==
=== 60th anniversary of the Yamamoto shootdown ===
On April 18, 2003, Governor Ted Kulongoski proclaimed the day "Rex T. Barber Day." The previous week, the Oregon State Legislature had declared that the new bridge on U.S. Highway 97 over the Crooked River was to be named the Rex T. Barber Veterans Memorial Bridge in his honor. This bridge replaced the Crooked River High Bridge. The new bridge, plaque and kiosk honoring Barber were dedicated on August 9, 2003, at Peter Skene Ogden State Scenic Viewpoint.
