= Peter Skene Ogden State Scenic Viewpoint =

State park in Oregon, United States

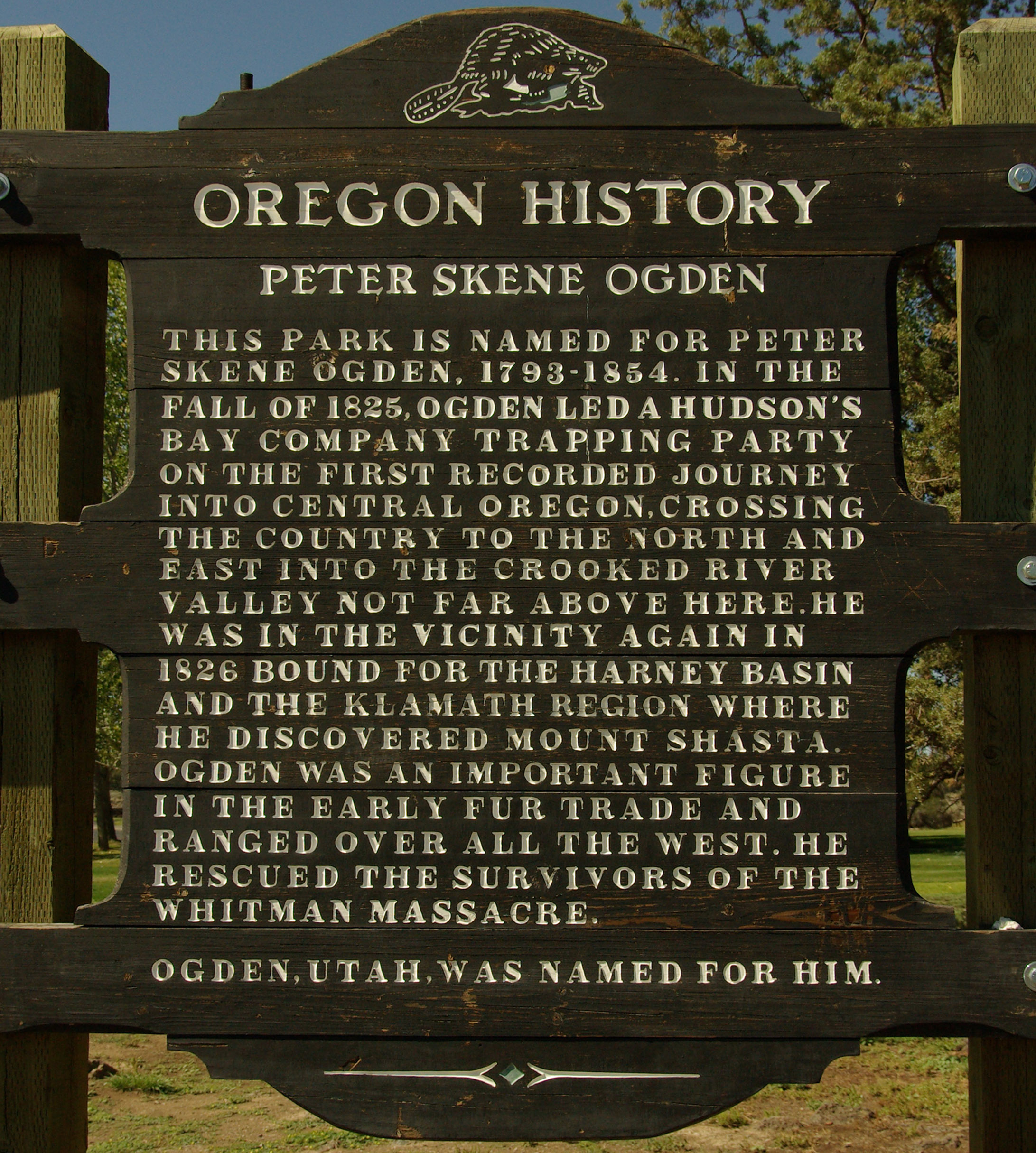
- Peter Skene Ogden historical marker

- Location within Oregon Location within the United States
- Type: Public, state
- Location: Deschutes and Jefferson counties
- Nearest city: Redmond
- Coordinates: 44°23′29″N 121°11′37″W
- Operator: Oregon Parks and Recreation Department

The Peter Skene Ogden State Scenic Viewpoint is a state park on the Crooked River in Oregon, United States. It is on the border of Deschutes and Jefferson counties.

== History ==
The facility is named in honor of Peter Skene Ogden who first entered the Crooked River Valley while leading a Hudson's Bay Company trapping party in 1825. Although no mention is made at the park itself, it was also the site of one of Oregon's most sensational murders, which led to the conviction of Jeannace June Freeman of first degree murder. She was the first woman ever sentenced to death in Oregon, and remained the only woman ever sentenced to death in Oregon until 2011. Her conviction was upheld by the Oregon Supreme Court, though she was not in fact executed.

== Features ==
Located 9 miles (14 km) north of Redmond along on U.S. Route 97, Peter Skene Ogden State Scenic Viewpoint is a rest area and viewpoint with limited (but available) parking for trucks and vehicles with trailers. Facilities include restrooms, picnic tables and dramatic viewing of the Crooked River canyon, as well as a views of the Crooked River Railroad Bridge, the Crooked River High Bridge, and the Rex T. Barber Veterans Memorial Bridge. The area is very popular with photographers. The developed area is on the west side of U.S. Route 97, but is accessible easily to both north and southbound traffic with a drive through parking and loop exit for both trucks and trailers.

The viewpoint is also the site of a memorial honoring World War II flying ace Rex T. Barber.

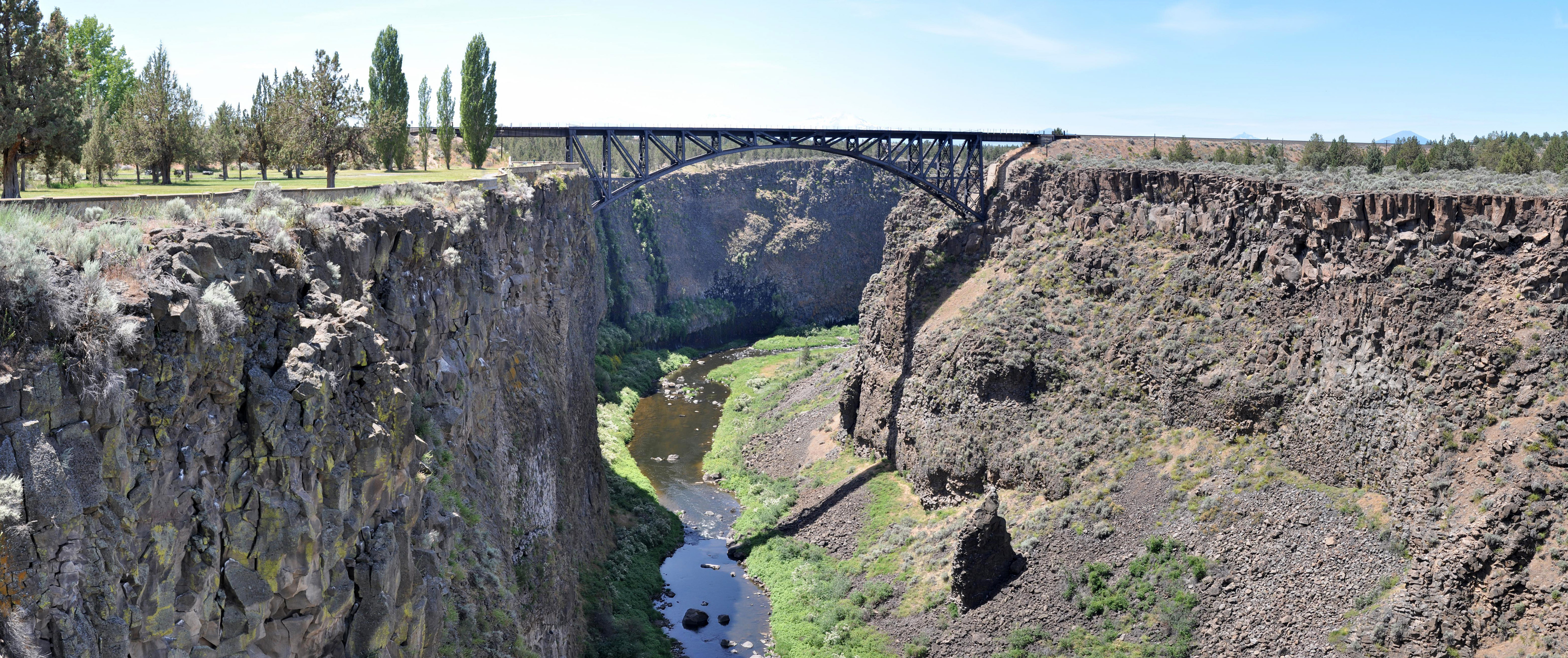
Crooked River Railroad Bridge spanning the canyon at Peter Skene Ogden State Scenic Viewpoint, to the left

== See also ==
- List of Oregon state parks
