= South Fork Crooked River =

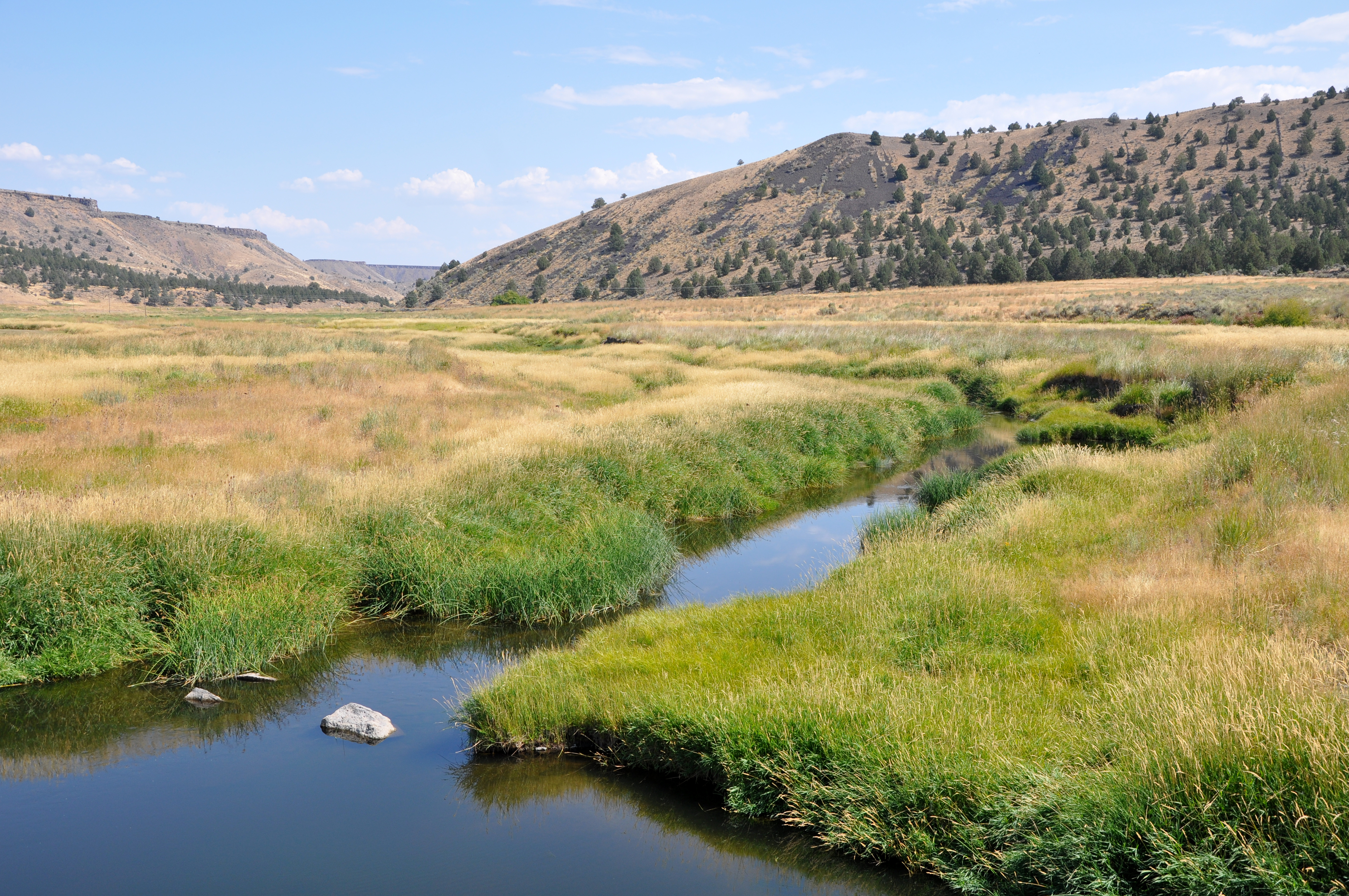
- Lower river west of Paulina

- Location of the mouth of South Fork Crooked River in Oregon

Location
- Country: United States
- State: Oregon
- County: Deschutes and Crook

Physical characteristics
- Source: Ram Lake (dry)
  - location: near Hampton, Deschutes County
  - coordinates: 43°38′55″N 120°23′40″W
  - elevation: 4,779 ft (1,457 m)
- Mouth: Crooked River
  - location: near Paulina, Crook County
  - coordinates: 44°06′05″N 120°03′04″W
  - elevation: 3,622 ft (1,104 m)
- Length: 76 mi (122 km)
- Basin size: 1,530 sq mi (4,000 km^{2})

The South Fork Crooked River is a tributary, 76 miles (122 km) long, of the Crooked River in the U.S. state of Oregon. Starting southeast of Hampton in Deschutes County, the South Fork flows east from near Ram Lake (dry). It passes under U.S. Route 20 at Hampton, then continues east and north for about 6 miles (10 km) before entering Crook County. Shortly thereafter, east of Hampton Buttes, it receives Buck Creek from the right and then passes through Logan Reservoir. Flowing north, it receives Sand Hollow Creek from the left, then Twelvemile Creek from the right before crossing under Oregon Route 380 (Southeast Paulina Highway). Just north of the highway, in southeastern Crook County, the river joins Beaver Creek to form the Crooked River 125 miles (201 km) from its confluence with the Deschutes River.

The South Fork Crooked River drains a sparsely populated basin of 1,530 square miles (4,000 km^{2}). About 75 percent of the basin is rangeland; the rest is a mixture of forests, pasture, and hay fields. Precipitation varies from less than 9 inches (230 mm) near the river's source to as much as 35 inches (890 mm) in the Ochoco Mountains on the northeastern edge of the watershed.

== See also ==
- List of rivers of Oregon
- List of longest streams of Oregon
