= Jeannace June Freeman =

20th-century American murderer in Oregon

Jeannace June Freeman (June 22, 1941 – December 19, 2003), also known as Wilma Lin Rhule, was the first woman ever sentenced to death in the U.S. state of Oregon, and remained the only woman sentenced to death in Oregon until 2011. Her conviction was upheld by the Oregon Supreme Court, though she was never executed.

== Biography ==
Jeannace June Freeman was born on June 22, 1941 in Cottage Grove, Oregon. In her early childhood, she experienced repeated sexual abuse from her stepfather. According to a former school counselor, Freeman attempted to seek help from authorities when she was 12, but police said there was not enough evidence to press charges. At some point in her teenage years, she became a ward of the state and moved from school to school before eventually being sent to the Hillcrest School of Oregon.

Freeman was responsible for the murder of her partner Gertrude May Nuñez Jackson's two children on May 11, 1961. Freeman and Jackson met when Jackson (32 years old) hired Freeman (19 years old) as a babysitter. They soon became lovers, though the relationship was volatile.

According to Jackson's later testimony in court, Freeman beat Jackson's son Larry to death, with a tire iron, in a fit of rage. Jackson agreed to conceal the crime and go along with killing her daughter Martha. They discarded both children's bodies in Crooked River Gorge, at Peter Skene Ogden State Scenic Viewpoint. The pair fled to Berkeley, California, where they were arrested a few weeks after the children's bodies were discovered and identified. Jackson agreed to testify against Freeman in exchange for a life sentence. The date of her parole is disputed, with some sources saying she was released in 1968 and others saying she was released in June 1976. On September 15, 1961, Freeman was found guilty of first degree murder. She was sentenced to death four days later.

After losing her appeal to the Oregon Supreme Court, Freeman was scheduled for execution on December 6, 1962. However, she won a stay of execution on November 23, 1962. On January 5, 1963, Governor Mark Hatfield rejected a clemency request from Freeman. Her execution was rescheduled for January 29, 1963, and then for August 1, but she won two stays on January 17 and July 10, respectively, as she continued to appeal. On January 31, 1964, Freeman received an execution date for March 6, but she won a fifth stay on February 10. When Oregon voters abolished capital punishment in 1964, Governor Hatfield commuted Freeman's sentence to life imprisonment. On her request, Freeman was transferred to the Federal Reformatory For Women in Alderson, West Virginia in 1969. Some time in the late 1970s or early 1980s, she was transferred to the Federal Correctional Institution near Pleasanton, California. Freeman was paroled in July 1983, but returned to prison as a parole violator in January 1984. She had given her parole officer her incorrect address, was carrying a knife, and was living with a woman who had children. Freeman was served another 19 months before being paroled again on July 29, 1985. She later changed her name to Wilma Lin Rhule.

In February 2002, Freeman was arrested for forcing two acquaintances to drive her to a store at knifepoint after threatening to notify their landlord of a lease agreement violation unless they complied. In May 2002, she pleaded guilty to coercion and unlawful use of a dangerous weapon. While Freeman could have been freed on probation, the judge sentenced her to four years in prison, which was considered a relatively long sentence for the charges. The spokesperson for the Lane County District Attorney's Office said afterwards that Freeman's prior conviction for murder was the main factor in the length of the sentence.

Freeman died of emphysema and lung cancer on December 19. 2003, while still in custody at Coffee Creek Correctional Facility.

== See also ==
- List of homicides in Oregon
- Murder in United States law
