= Glass Buttes =

Group of volcanic mountains in central Oregon

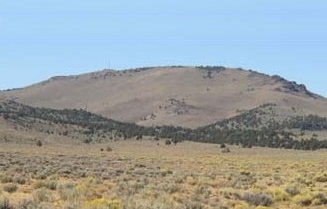
- Glass Buttes are a high desert landmark

Highest point
- Elevation: 6,385 ft (1,946 m)
- Prominence: 2,000 ft (610 m)
- Coordinates: 43°33′27″N 120°04′28″W

Geography
- Location within Oregon
- Location: Lake County, Oregon, US
- Topo map: USGS Glass Butte

Geology
- Rock age: 5 to 5.8 million years
- Mountain type: Silicic domes

Climbing
- Easiest route: Rough dirt road

Glass Buttes are a group of volcanic mountains made up of two prominent peaks and several smaller hills. They are located in the remote northeast corner of Lake County between Bend and Burns in central Oregon, United States. Raising high above the high desert plain, the buttes are an important landmark in an area once known as the Oregon's Great Sandy Desert. The buttes are named for the numerous large deposits of obsidian found on their slopes. Today, most of the mountains and surrounding land are administered by the Bureau of Land Management. The mountains offer a number of recreational opportunities including rock collecting, hiking, camping, and hunting.

== Geography and geology ==
Glass Buttes are located in Oregon's high desert in the northeast corner of Lake County, approximately 70 miles (110 km) southeast of Bend and 50 miles (80 km) west of Burns. The nearest settlement is the small unincorporated community of Hampton, Oregon, located 10 miles (16 km) northwest of the buttes.

Glass Buttes include two prominent peaks and a number of adjacent hills. The highest point in the Glass Buttes complex is known as Glass Butte. Its elevation is 6,388 feet (1,947 m) above sea level. The buttes are steep with a number of massive basalt outcroppings scatter along the slopes. There is a secondary peak southeast of the main summit called Little Glass Butte that has an elevation of 6,155 feet (1,876 m). The buttes are a major landmark, rising well above the surrounding high desert plain with a topographic prominence of approximately 2,000 feet (610 m).

Glass Buttes were formed approximately 5 to 5.8 million years ago during the late Miocene and Pliocene epochs. The mountains are remnants of ancient silicic volcanoes that have been worn down by erosion. They were formed during three lava flow periods. The foundation flows were basalt. They were followed by rhyolitic lava flows which were in turn covered by a second series of basalt flows from local vents. The primary rock that makes up the mountains is rhyolite which in some areas has been mineralized by geothermal forces. Deposits of cinnabar, alunite, hematite, hyalite, and pyrite are also found in certain areas.

== Environment and ecology ==
Glass Buttes are part of Oregon's high desert environment. The area around the buttes is extremely arid with little or no natural surface water most of the year. In fact, Glass Buttes are a major landmark in the middle of what was once known as Oregon's Great Sandy Desert. The ground cover on the mountain slopes is primarily sagebrush, green rabbitbrush, mountain mahogany, Idaho fescue, and bluebunch wheatgrass. However, on the north and west facing slopes and in some canyon areas there are dispersed western juniper trees and some pine groves with an understory dominated by sagebrush and mountain mahogany. There are also willows in some seasonal drainage areas.

Glass Buttes and the surrounding area host a variety of wildlife. Larger mammals found in the area include pronghorn, mule deer, elk, coyotes, bobcats, and cougars. Smaller mammals include American badgers, striped skunks, black-tailed jackrabbits, white-tailed jackrabbits, pygmy rabbits, Belding's ground squirrels, golden-mantled ground squirrels, least chipmunks, Ord's kangaroo rats, canyon mice, deer mice, and northern grasshopper mice. Rattlesnakes and several lizard species are also common in the area around Glass Buttes.

Birds common to the area around Glass Buttes include sagebrush sparrow, lark sparrow, Brewer's sparrow, mountain bluebird, green-tailed towhee, sage thrasher, Brewer's blackbird, and black-billed magpie. The Glass Buttes area is also prime habitat for greater sage-grouse. Larger birds found in the area include barn owls, great horned owls, prairie falcons, red-tailed hawks, turkey vultures, and golden eagles.

== History ==
For thousands of years, Native Americans used obsidian for making cutting tools, arrowheads, and spear points. Obsidian was also an important trade good for Native Americans. Glass Buttes obsidian was used for these purposes at least 9000 years ago. Clovis people may have also collected obsidian at Glass Buttes up to 13,000 years ago. Glass Buttes obsidian has been found at sites throughout the Pacific Northwest, from British Columbia in the north to California in the south and as far east as Idaho. Some reports place Glass Buttes obsidian artifacts at archaeological sites as far east as Ohio.

In the early twentieth century, American homesteaders began to settle in scattered sites around Glass Buttes. Most of the homesteaders arrived between 1910 and 1913. The only community in the area was Stauffer. It was located in the Lost Creek Valley, just south of Glass Buttes. The Stauffer post office was opened in 1913, but the community was never incorporated. Many of the settlers in Stauffer used logs from juniper trees cut on Glass Buttes to build their home. They also decorated their homes with obsidian gathers from sites around the buttes. By 1918, homesteads around Glass Buttes were being abandoned due to economic pressures created by federal policies during World War I and the lack of water for livestock. However, a small post office was maintained at Stauffer until 1950.

In the 1930s, Percy L. Forbes, a local rancher and self-taught geologist, began surveying the obsidian and mineral deposits in the Glass Buttes area. In 1934, the Bend Bulletin reported that Forbes had found numerous obsidian sites and had identified seven specific varieties of natural glass around Glass Buttes. His discoveries included an iridescent rainbow-colored variety with bands of blue, green, red, pink, and gold that was unique to the Glass Buttes area.

Mercury was mined in the Glass Buttes mountain complex from the mid-1940s to the early 1960s. The mercury deposits were first identified by P. L. Forbes in 1933. By 1957, there were 25 mining claims in the Glass Buttes area. At that time, the largest mine was producing 65 to 70 flasks of mercury per month. While the mercury was present in commercially valuable quantities, to cover production costs a relatively high market price was required. As a result, all the mines were closed by 1961 because the market price for mercury no longer covered the cost of production.

In 2009, a private company leased 37,500-acre (15,200 ha) around Glass Buttes from the Bureau of Land Management for geothermal exploration. The company's geologists believed they could find 300 °F (149 °C) water about 3,000 feet (910 m) below the ground surface. The project involved construction and maintenance of several access roads as well as drilling, testing, and monitoring of up to 13 geothermal wells on public lands. The project also includes three exploratory wells on private land near Glass Buttes. An environmental assessment study was completed in 2013. Based on study, the Bureau of Land Management approved seven geothermal test wells. If the test wells find hot enough water, the company will use it to drive steam turbines to generate electricity.

Today, there is a rough road that goes to the top of Glass Butte, the highest point in the mountain complex. The road services several communication towers located at the summit. In 2015, the Oregon Department of Transportation began a project to repair or replace on-sites components of the state's radio network used by the department of transportation and the Oregon State Police. Work on the Glass Butte towers began in 2016.

== Recreation ==
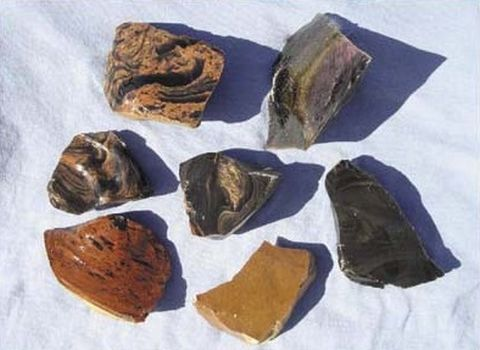
Examples of Glass Buttes obsidian

The Glass Buttes area offers a number of recreational opportunities including rock collecting, hiking, camping, hunting, and nature study. Of these activities, rock collecting is the most popular. The buttes have one of the largest and most diverse deposits of obsidian in the world. In fact, the mountains are named for the numerous deposits of obsidian found on their slopes. There is a wide variety of high-quality obsidian found in the area including jet black, brown, green, red fire, pumpkin, mahogany, midnight lace, rainbow, gold sheen, silver sheen, and snowflake as well as several double flow varieties. While some rockhounds dig for preferred obsidian specimens, there are large fields of colorful obsidian readily available on the ground for easy collection.

Today, most of the land on and around Glass Buttes is owned by the United States Government. Those Federal lands are administered by the Department of Interior's Bureau of Land Management. Because the Glass Buttes complex has abundant, high-quality obsidian, the Bureau of Land Management has reserved 36 square miles (93 km^{2}) as a free-use area where the public can gather obsidian for private use. No permits are required; however, individuals can only remove 250 pounds (110 kg) of obsidian per year. There is also some state-owned land and a few private obsidian claims in the Glass Buttes area that are not generally open to the public.

The Glass Buttes area is very remote and extremely rugged. The access roads are not maintained so four-wheel drive vehicles are recommended. Also, the widely dispersed natural glass (obsidian) increases the chances of a flat tire on the roads. It is normally quite dry in the Glass Buttes areas; however, when it rains the road can quickly become impassable even for four-wheel drive vehicles. There are no developed campsites or other facilities in the area; however, dispersed camping is permitted. During the summer, it is recommended that visitors check with the Prineville Bureau of Land Management District regarding fire restrictions before traveling to the area.
