= Stauffer, Oregon =

Abandoned town in Oregon, United States

- Ghost town
- Stauffer homestead in the winter, 1915

- Location in Lake County and Oregon Stauffer (the United States)
- Coordinates: 43°29′04″N 120°07′00″W
- Country: United States
- State: Oregon
- County: Lake
- Established: ca. 1911
- Elevation: 4,570 ft (1,390 m)

Population
  - Total: 0
- Time zone: UTC-8 (Pacific)
  - Summer (DST): UTC-7 (Pacific)

Stauffer was an unincorporated community located in Lake County, Oregon, United States. The first homesteaders arrived in the area around 1910. By 1918, the local population was declining rapidly due to the harsh environment. Today, Stauffer is a ghost town with no population and no surviving structures. The site is located approximately 12 miles (19 km) south of U.S. Route 20 between Bend and Burns, Oregon. The nearest inhabited place is Hampton, Oregon, 21 miles (34 km) northwest of the Stauffer site.

== Geography and environment ==
The Stauffer town site is in the Lost Creek Valley, in the northeast corner of Lake County. It is deep in Oregon’s remote high desert country. The site is located on an unimproved dirt road 12 miles (19 km) south of Route 20, approximately 70 miles (110 km) southeast of Bend and 50 miles (80 km) southwest of Burns.

The elevation at the site is 4,570 feet (1,390 m) above sea level. Stauffer is just a few miles south of Glass Buttes, which is well known for its extensive obsidian deposits. The buttes are a major landmark, rising well above the surrounding high desert plain with a topographic prominence of approximately 2,000 feet (610 m). Snow melt from the southern slopes of Glass Buttes drains into the Lost Creek Valley where Stauffer is located. It was common for Stauffer area homesteaders to collect obsidian from Glass Buttes.

In the high desert country around the Stauffer site, the soil is thin and alkaline. Rainfall is limited, just 8 inches (20 cm) to 10 inches (25 cm) per year. As a result, vegetation is sparse, consisting mainly of sagebrush and bunchgrass with widely dispersed western juniper in some areas.

== Charles Stauffer ==
The first settlers arrived in the Stauffer area around 1910. They were drawn there by the promise of free land made available by the Homestead Act of 1909. Charles Albert Stauffer, his wife Maude, and their family of nine children moved to Oregon from Nebraska in 1910. After he arrived, Stauffer filed a homestead claim in the Lost Creek Valley. He quickly became a community leader. In addition to his ranch operation, Stauffer served as the community's postmaster. He was also a notary public and a United States Land Commissioner, who processed land claims for newly arrived homesteaders. In 1914, he started a weekly newspaper called the Stauffer Enterprise, but no record of the newspaper exists today.

In 1918, Bill Brown, a wealthy sheep and horse rancher from neighboring Crook County, had Stauffer arrested for stealing sheep. Stauffer denied the charges, saying he was holding the sheep for a third party named Perry, who also claimed to own the animals. A grand jury decided not to indict Stauffer and all charges were dropped. Stauffer then filed a $50,000 malicious prosecution lawsuit against Brown. He later dropped the requested damages to $10,000. That claim went to trial, but the jury sided with Brown, rejecting Stauffer’s damage claim.

Stauffer and his family left the Lost Creek Valley in 1919. They relocated to Bend. A year after moving to Bend, one of Stauffer’s six sons fell ill and died at age seventeen. In 1928, Charles and Maude Stauffer moved to Portland, Oregon, where they lived for the rest of their lives. Maude died there in 1936. Stauffer died at his home in Portland in 1943.

== Community history ==
Most of the initial homesteaders in the Stauffer area lived in tents for many months waiting for lumber to be shipped in from Bend or Prineville. Other settlers cut Juniper trees on the slopes of Glass Buttes for logs to build rustic cabins. Basic food products and other supplies were delivered by freight wagon from Bend every six months, a trip that took six days each way.

Once the Stauffer homesteaders were settled in, they planted backyard gardens that provided fresh vegetables. Many also brought dairy cows to their homesteads to provide milk and to use for producing cheese. Hunting rabbits, deer, and antelope on the high desert range provided meat for homestead families. Also, community rabbit drives were important events in Stauffer. To brighten up their homes, many homesteaders decorated their rustic dwellings with obsidian gathers from sites around nearby Glass Buttes. Today, many abandoned homestead sites around Stauffer are marked by piles of obsidian collected by pioneer families.

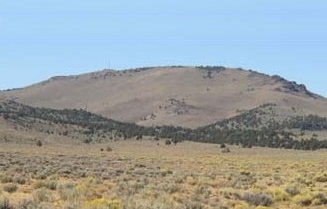
Glass Buttes north of the Stauffer town site

The Stauffer post office was opened on 13 September 1913. Residents originally wanted to name the post office Lost Creek. However, the United States postal system already had a post office with that name, so it was named after Charles Stauffer, who was the community’s first postmaster.

The community centered around the Stauffer ranch and the adjacent post office. Beyond that, the Stauffer community never developed into much of a town. It had no general store, tavern, hotel, or any public buildings except the post office and a one-room schoolhouse. Alice Brookings was the first teacher at the Stauffer school. She later became postmistress when Stauffer left that position. Brookings ran the post office until 1917, when the post office was moved back to the Stauffer ranch.

A few years after the initial rush of settlers arrived between 1910 and 1913, the lack of water and the harsh freezing winters, when temperatures often dropped to −25 °F (−32 °C), forced many homesteaders to abandon their Lost Creek Valley land claims. While mail deliveries from Bend had increased to twice a week by 1916, the exodus from the Lost Creek Valley homesteads had become pronounced. By 1918, only ten Stauffer residents voted in that year’s election. Charles Stauffer and Fred Donovan delivered the ballots to the Lake County seat in Lakeview, 90 miles (140 km) south of the Lost Creek Valley.

By 1922, the Stauffer mail route from Bend only served 25 families along the entire 70-mile (110 km) route. Over the next decade, the enrollment at Stauffer’s school continued to shrink. By 1934, there were only five students in the school. The following year, the last two students left the Stauffer area and the school was closed. That same year, the Stauffer post office was closed and postal serve was transferred to Hampton, which was located on the main Route 20 highway between Bend and Burns. However, a postal substation was maintained at Stauffer until 1950, when all postal service to the Stauffer area was permanently discontinued.

In 1943, the United States Army conducted a large-scale battle near the Stauffer town site as part of the Oregon Maneuver training exercise to prepare troops for combat in World War II. The Oregon Maneuver was one of the largest military training exercises ever conducted in the continental United States with over 100,000 soldiers and airmen participating.

The last resident left Lost Creek Valley sometime in the 1950s. By 1977, only a few scattered remnants of homesteader cabins remained in the valley. Today, Stauffer is a ghost town with no population and no surviving structures. The nearest inhabited place is the small unincorporated community of Hampton, Oregon, which is located 21 miles (34 km) northwest of the Stauffer site.
