= Bridge Creek Wildlife Area =

Wildlife reserve in Oregon, United States

- IUCN category V (protected landscape/seascape)
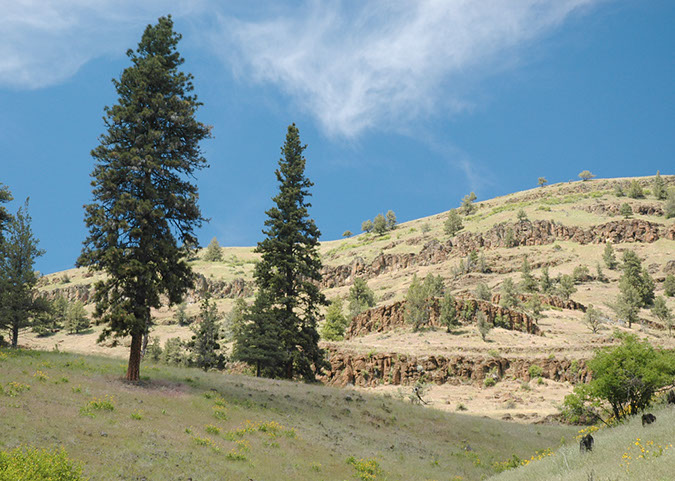

- Location within the United States
- Location: Umatilla County, Oregon
- Nearest city: Ukiah, Oregon
- Coordinates: 45.0470937°N 118.9413661°W
- Area: 15,206 acres (61.54 km^{2})
- Established: 1961
- Governing body: Oregon Department of Fish and Wildlife

The Bridge Creek Wildlife Area is a wildlife management area located near Ukiah, Oregon, United States. The location was set aside in 1961 as a wintering area for elk.

The area is administered by the Oregon Department of Fish and Wildlife.
