= Willow Creek Wildlife Area =

Protected area in Oregon, United States

Coordinates: 45.7821°N 120.0073°W

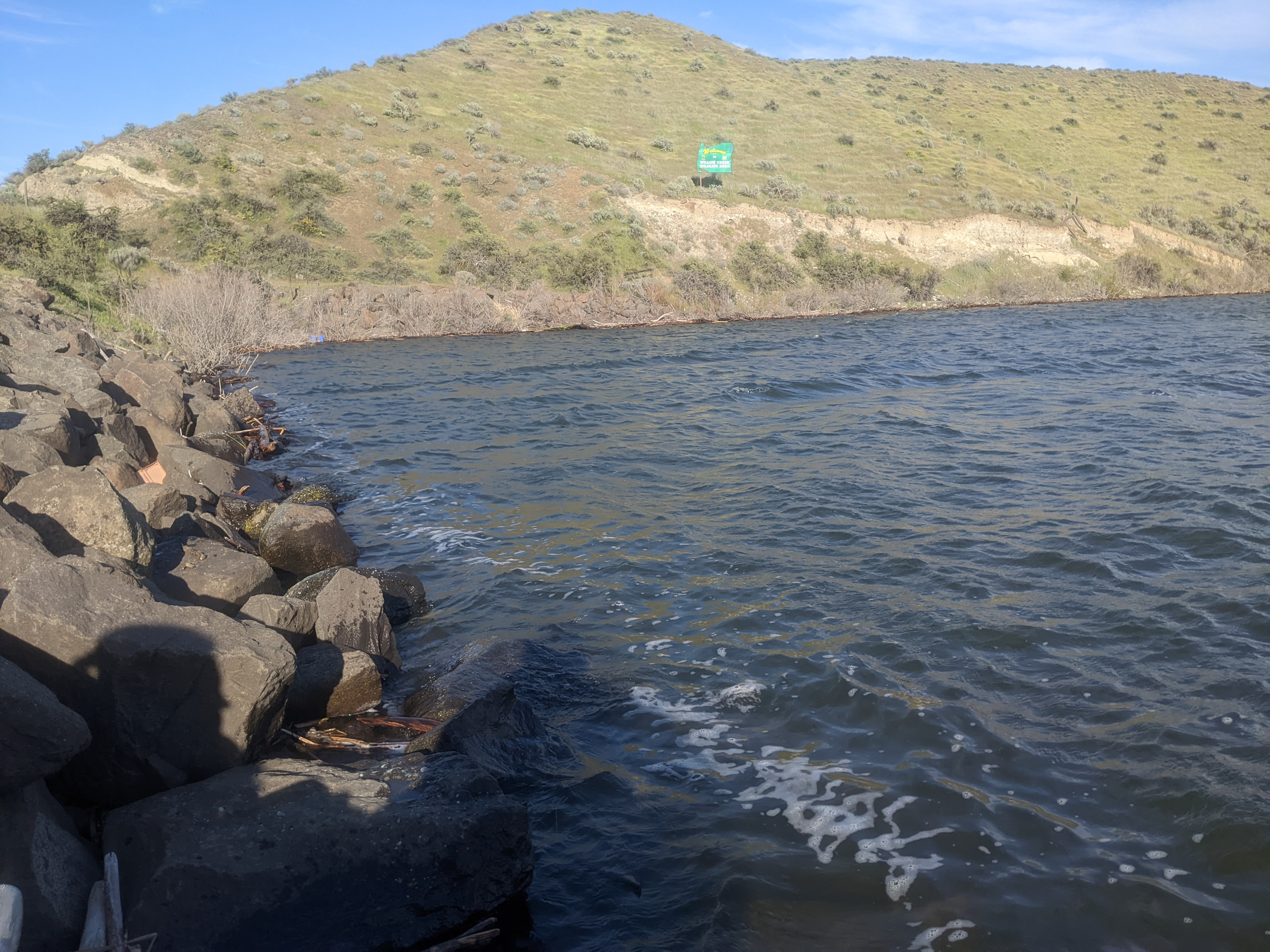
- Willow Lake and wildlife area
- Interactive map of Willow Creek Wildlife Area
- Location: Gilliam County, Oregon, United States
- Nearest city: Arlington, Oregon
- Area: 646 acres (2.61 km^{2})
- Governing body: Oregon Fish and Wildlife

Willow Creek Wildlife Area, located in northeastern Oregon, United States, near the Columbia River, is operated by the Oregon Department of Fish and Wildlife. Birds watchers may find birds of prey, waterfowl, wading birds, songbirds and shorebirds.

It is one of four wildlife areas in the Columbia Basin, all open seven days a week. The other three are Coyote Springs, Irrigon, and Power City Wildlife Areas. The Willow Creek Wildlife Area is 646 acres (261 ha) of wetland, sagebrush steppe, grassland, and agricultural habitats. Visitors may hunt deer, pheasant, quail, duck, geese and mourning doves. Boat access is provided and camping is allowed in a designated parking area. There are no restroom facilities.
