= Beaver Creek (Crooked River tributary) =

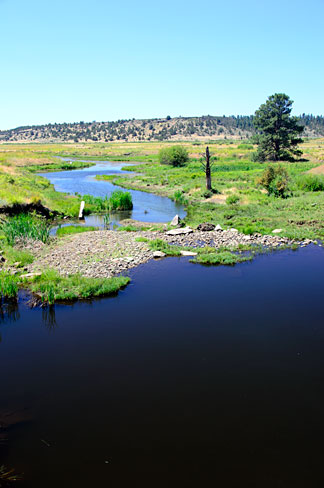
- Beaver Creek on Laughlin Table

- Location of the mouth of Beaver Creek in Oregon

Location
- Country: United States
- State: Oregon
- County: Crook

Physical characteristics
- Source: Confluence of north and south forks
  - location: Laughlin Table
  - coordinates: 44°10′21″N 119°45′46″W
  - elevation: 3,834 ft (1,169 m)
- Mouth: Crooked River
  - location: near Paulina
  - coordinates: 44°06′05″N 120°03′04″W
  - elevation: 3,622 ft (1,104 m)

Beaver Creek is a tributary of the Crooked River in the U.S. state of Oregon. It is formed by the confluence of its two forks in southeastern Crook County, a sparsely populated part of Central Oregon. North Fork Beaver Creek flows south and then west around Laughlin Table. South Fork Beaver Creek drains the slopes of Snow Mountain and Funny Butte in southwestern Grant County before joining the North Fork.

The Beaver Creek main stem flows west from the forks' confluence to near Birdsong Butte then southwest down Paulina Valley past the unincorporated community of Paulina to join the South Fork Crooked River. From this confluence, the main stem of the Crooked River flows generally west 125 miles (201 km) to meet the Deschutes River, a tributary of the Columbia River.

Named tributaries of the creek from source to mouth are Sugar Creek, which enters from the right; Grindstone Creek, left; Wolf and Paulina creeks, right; Alkali Creek, left; Profanity Gulch, right, and Drift Canyon, left. Oregon Route 380 (Paulina Highway) runs along the lower creek from near Paulina to the mouth. The stream flows under the highway twice, first slightly upstream of Paulina and then further downstream near Profanity Gulch.

== Camping ==
Sugar Creek Campground is along Sugar Creek, a tributary of Beaver Creek that flows generally west to the main stem from the Ochoco Mountains. Amenities include three campsites, picnic tables, toilets, and drinking water. A short paved trail at the campground follows Sugar Creek through a forest of ponderosa pines.

Wolf Creek Campground is along Wolf Creek, another tributary of Beaver Creek that flows west from the same mountainous area as Sugar Creek. Amenities include campsites, picnic tables and toilets. The campground roads are narrow with tight corners and RVs over 20' are not recommended. Both campgrounds are managed by the United States Forest Service.

== See also ==
- List of rivers in Oregon
