= Wenaha Wildlife Area =

Wildlife area

- IUCN category V (protected landscape/seascape)
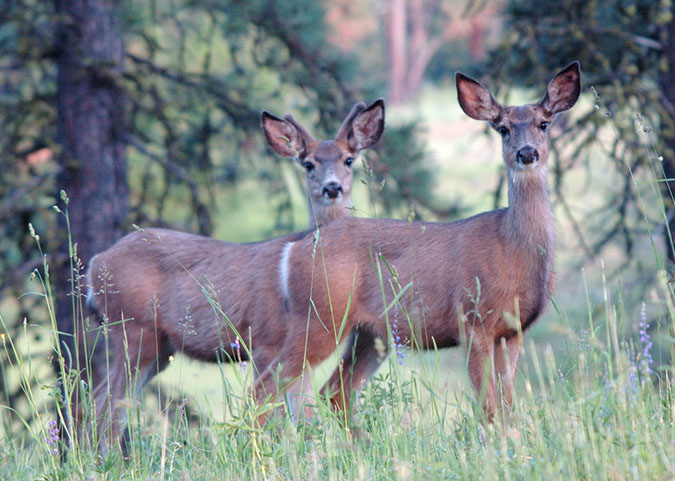
- Two mule deer in Wenaha Wildlife Area

- Location within Oregon
- Location: Wallowa County, Oregon
- Nearest city: Troy
- Coordinates: 45.905688°N 117.519772°W
- Area: 12,419 acres (5,026 ha)
- Governing body: Oregon Department of Fish and Wildlife
- Website: www.dfw.state.or.us/resources/visitors/wenaha_wildlife_area.asp

Wenaha Wildlife Area is a 12,419-acre (5,026 ha) wildlife area near Troy, Oregon, United States. It is operated by the Oregon Department of Fish and Wildlife. The area is bordered by Umatilla National Forest. Wildlife visible in the park includes bald eagles, bears, bighorn sheep, bobcats, elk, mule deer, and wild turkey.
