= Elkhorn Wildlife Area =

Wildlife management area in Oregon, United States

- IUCN category V (protected landscape/seascape)
- Location within the United States
- Location: Baker County and Union County, Oregon
- Nearest city: North Powder, Oregon
- Coordinates: 45.0304139°N 118.0954957°W
- Area: 8,674 acres (35.10 km^{2})
- Established: 1971
- Governing body: ODFW, BLM, and USFS

The Elkhorn Wildlife Area is a wildlife management area located near North Powder, Oregon, United States. The large site covers parts of Union and Baker counties, including parts of the Wallowa-Whitman National Forest.

The area was set aside in 1971 for protecting migrating elk and deer during the winter months. Ownership of the land falls principally to the Oregon Department of Fish and Wildlife with 26.57 km^{2} (10.26 mi^{2}), almost 76%. The remainder is divided amongst the United States Forest Service, the Bureau of Land Management, and private owners.
