= Peter Skene Ogden =

British-Canadian fur trapper and explorer

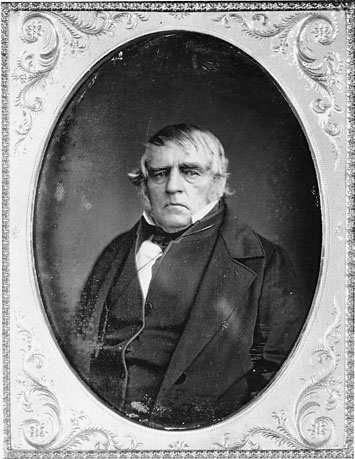
- Baptised: 12 February 1790
- Died: 27 September 1854 (aged 63–64); Oregon City, Oregon Territory
- Resting place: Mountain View Cemetery, Oregon City, Oregon; 45°20′28″N 122°35′25″W
- Occupations: Fur trader, explorer
- Employers: American Fur Company; North West Company; Hudson's Bay Company
- Known for: Exploring the western United States
- Partner: Julia Rivet (1818–1854)
- Children: 8
- Relatives: Charles Richard Ogden (brother)

Peter Skene Ogden (alternately Skeene, Skein, or Skeen; baptised 12 February 1790 – 27 September 1854) was a British-Canadian fur trader and an early explorer of what is now British Columbia and the Western United States. During his many expeditions, he explored parts of Oregon, Washington, Nevada, California, Utah, Idaho, and Wyoming. Despite early confrontations with the Hudson's Bay Company (HBC) while working for the North West Company, he later became a senior official in the operations of the HBC's Columbia Department, serving as manager of Fort Simpson and similar posts.

== Family ==
Ogden was a son of Chief Justice of the Admiralty Court (1788–1808) Isaac Ogden of Quebec and his wife Sarah Hanson. The family was descended from a 17th-century British emigrant to the American colonies (Long Island and New Jersey).

Both Isaac and his father David were Loyalists during the American Revolution; Isaac relocated to England at this time, then later returned to British-run Quebec. One of Peter's brothers, Charles Richard Ogden, was a lawyer, politician, and public servant from Canada East. Peter Skene Ogden married Julia Rivet/Reava, a Metis/Nez Perce.

== Professional life ==
After a brief time with the American Fur Company, Ogden joined the North West Company in 1809. His first post was at Île-à-la-Crosse, Saskatchewan, in 1810, and by 1814 he was in charge of a post at Green Lake, Saskatchewan, 100 miles (160 km) south.

Ogden had frequent run-ins with the rival HBC employees and engaged in physical violence on several occasions. In 1816, HBC clerks reported that Ogden killed a Native American who had traded with the Hudson's Bay Company. The Native American was "butchered in a most cruel manner", according to HBC officer James Bird. Although many in the North West Company viewed this as a necessary part of living in the Northwest, the HBC viewed Ogden as a dangerous man whose actions were deplorable, especially considering his background as the son of a judge. Ogden was charged with murder, and the North West Company moved him further west to attempt to avoid any further confrontations with the HBC. He served at different posts in modern-day Oregon, Washington, and British Columbia for the next several years.

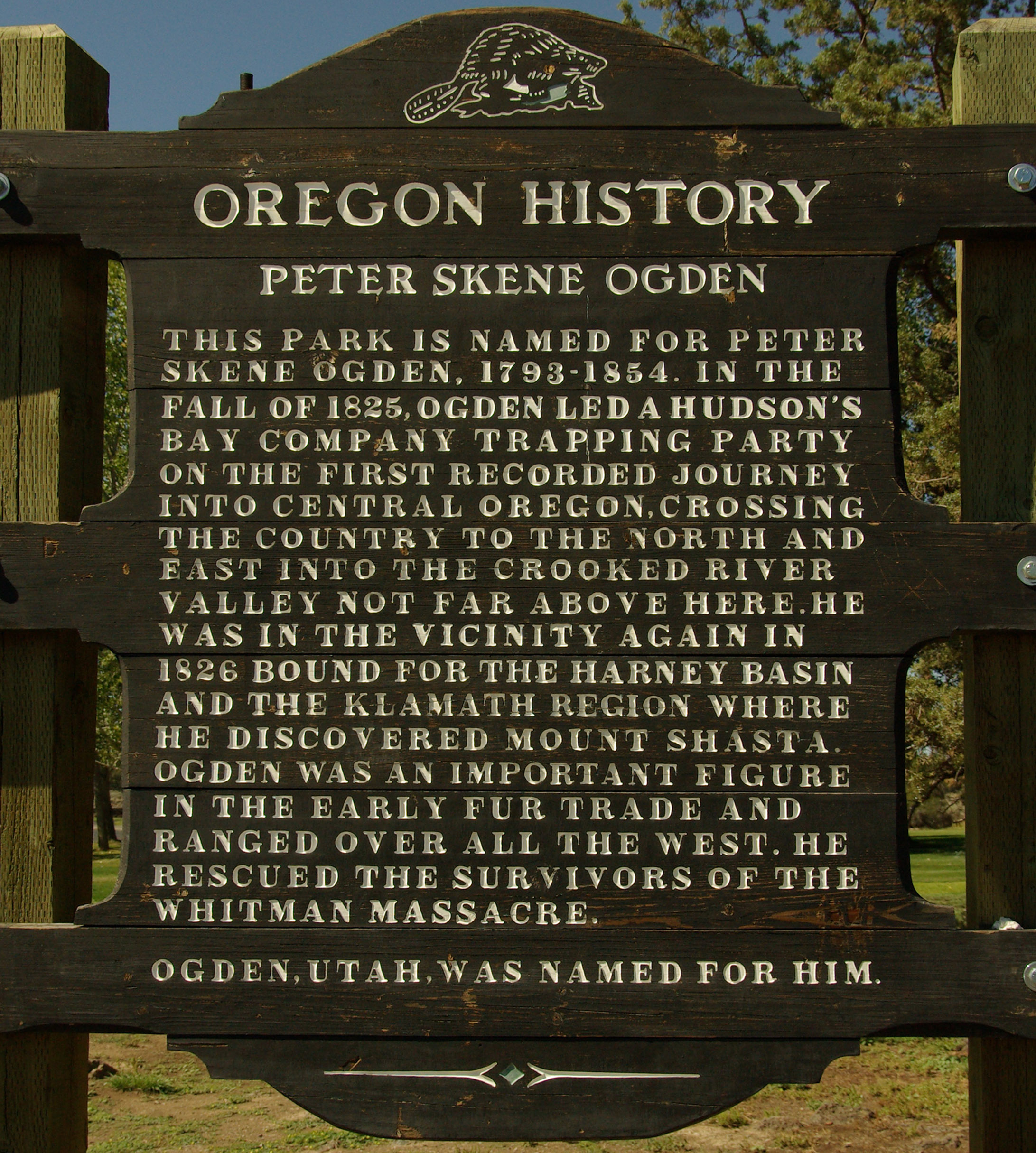
Historical marker at Peter Skene Ogden State Scenic Viewpoint in Oregon

As a way of ending the ongoing strife between the two companies, the HBC and the North West Company merged in 1821. Ogden's violent history placed the now larger HBC in a quandary. Some in the company management severely disliked and distrusted Ogden, but newly appointed governor George Simpson pushed for his reinstatement, arguing that he had done no more than many others during the "fur-trade wars". Ogden was admitted to the reconfigured HBC with the rank of Chief Trader in 1823 and put in charge of Spokane House. In November 1824, he was put in charge of the Snake River Country (part of the HBC's Columbia Department Expedition).

Between 1824 and 1830, Ogden led a series of expeditions to explore and trap in the Snake River Country. One of the company's objectives was to bring as many furs from this area as possible to the HBC so as to create a "fur desert", which was intended to discourage inroads by American trappers and traders. The exploration trips included:

- 1824–1825: Ogden led a fur brigade that expanded HBC's influence along the Snake River east to Montana's Bitterroot River and south to the Bear River in present-day Utah. During this trip, near modern Mountain Green, Utah, 23 freemen, independent trappers outfitted by HBC, defected with about 700 beaver pelts to Americans operating in the area.
- 1825–1826: Traveling south from the Columbia River to the Deschutes River in Oregon, Ogden then turned east and traveled through the Blue Mountains to the Snake River.
- 1826–1827: From Walla Walla, in present-day Washington, an expedition explored the Deschutes River, following it to Klamath Lake and an area near the upper Rogue River and Mount McLoughlin.
- 1827–1828 Ogden explored southern Idaho as far east as present day Idaho Falls.
- 1828–1829: Ogden explored the Great Salt Lake and the Weber River drainage, where the Ogden River, and subsequently the current city of Ogden, Utah, is named for him. He explored areas of the Great Basin, finding and following the Humboldt River, later named for German naturalist Alexander von Humboldt, 330 miles (530 km) west to its dry sink in present-day Nevada. A year earlier, in 1827, American trapper and explorer Jedediah Smith had become the first American to cross the Great Basin in 1827, traversing west to east from the Sierra Nevada near Ebbetts Pass. Smith, however, missed Humboldt Lake and the Humboldt River, and nearly died for lack of food and water. Ogden's easier route following the river eventually became part of the California Trail.
- 1829–1830: Leaving Fort Vancouver on 28 August 1829, Ogden proceeded to Walla Walla, then to the Great Salt Lake, then southwest, probably reaching the Gulf of California. He then went north through California, skirting the western foothills of the Sierra Nevada in order to avoid contact with Mexican authorities. The party arrived at Fort Nez Perce on 30 June and transferred to canoe-like Columbia boats. On 3 July, at The Dalles, nine men plus the wife and two sons of one of the men were drowned when their boat was caught in a whirlpool; also lost were 300 beaver pelts and all papers from the trip, including Ogden's journal. Ogden and the other survivors reached Fort Vancouver on 6 July 1830.

In 1830, Ogden was sent north to establish a new HBC post named Fort Simpson near the mouth of the Nass River in British Columbia. He also managed an outpost on the south coast of Alaska. In 1834, he was promoted to Chief Factor, HBC's highest field rank, spending 9 years at his new post at Fort St. James in the New Caledonia district of British Columbia, together from 1835 until 1844. In 1844, he took a one year leave of absence, spent predominantly in England. He returned to Lower Canada in 1845, whereupon after a accompanying clandestine survey trip from Lachine to the Columbia district, he arrived in Fort Vancouver and followed his orders to purchase Cape Disappointment for the Hudson's Bay Company. He administered Fort Vancouver in the late 1840s. There Ogden fought successfully against American fur competition and successfully negotiated with local native tribes, including the Cayuse. In 1847, Ogden averted an Indian war and successfully negotiated for the lives of 49 settlers taken as slaves by the Cayuse and Umatilla Indians after the Whitman massacre.

== Retirement and death ==
Ogden retired to Oregon City, Oregon, with one of his several Native American wives. His contact with native tribes led him to write a memoir, Traits of American Indian Life and Character. By a Fur Trader. The book was published posthumously in 1855. He died in 1854 and is buried at the Mountain View Cemetery in Oregon City. His fur brigade captain's journal for his expedition of 1826–1827 has been published as Peter Skene Ogden, Snake Country Journal 1826–1827 (London: Hudson's Bay Record Society, 1967, vol. 23, ed. K. G. Davies).

== Legacy ==
Places named for Peter Skene Ogden include:

- Ogden, Utah
- Ogden Valley, Utah
- Ogden Avenue, a street in downtown Las Vegas, Nevada
- Ogden Point in Victoria, British Columbia, Canada
- Peter S. Ogden Elementary School in Vancouver, Washington
- Peter Skene Ogden Secondary School in 100 Mile House, British Columbia, Canada
- Peter Skene Ogden State Scenic Viewpoint in Jefferson County, Oregon
- SS Peter Skene Ogden, a ship laid down 18 October 1942 and launched 14 November 1942. She was torpedoed off the coast of Algeria in 1944 and was later scrapped.
- Peter Skene Ogden Trail in La Pine, Oregon

== See also ==
- Whitman massacre
- Owyhee River History
