= Oregon Department of Fish and Wildlife =

Government agency of US state of Oregon

The Oregon Department of Fish and Wildlife (ODFW) is a government agency of the U.S. state of Oregon responsible for programs protecting Oregon fish and wildlife resources and their habitats. The agency operates hatcheries, issues hunting and angling licenses, advises on habitat protection, and sponsors public education programs. Its history dates to the 1878 establishment of the office of Columbia River Fish Warden. Since 1931, enforcement of Oregon's Fish and Game laws has been the responsibility of the Oregon State Police rather than separate wardens.

== Hunting, fishing, shellfishing and wildlife viewing ==
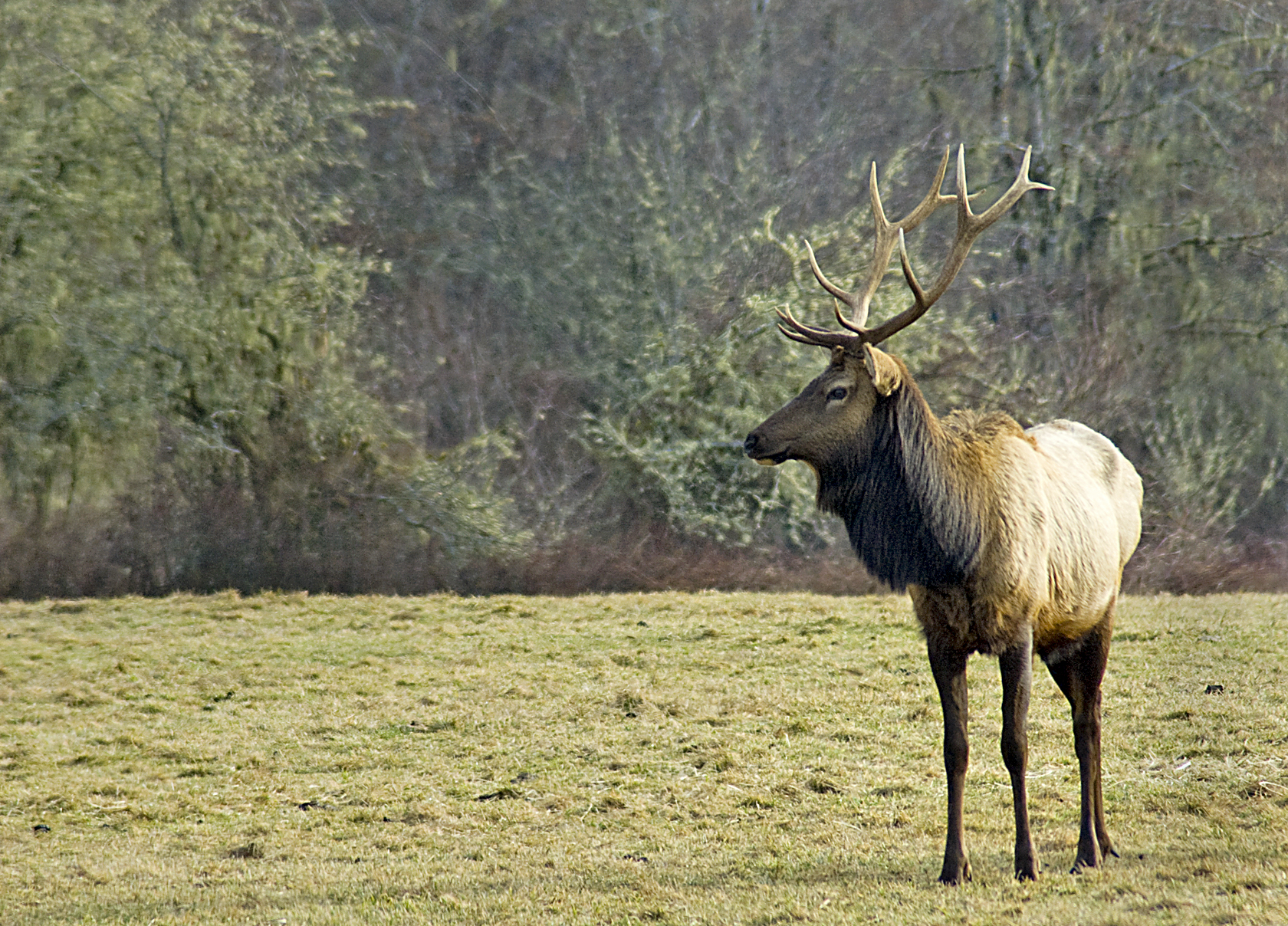
A bull elk

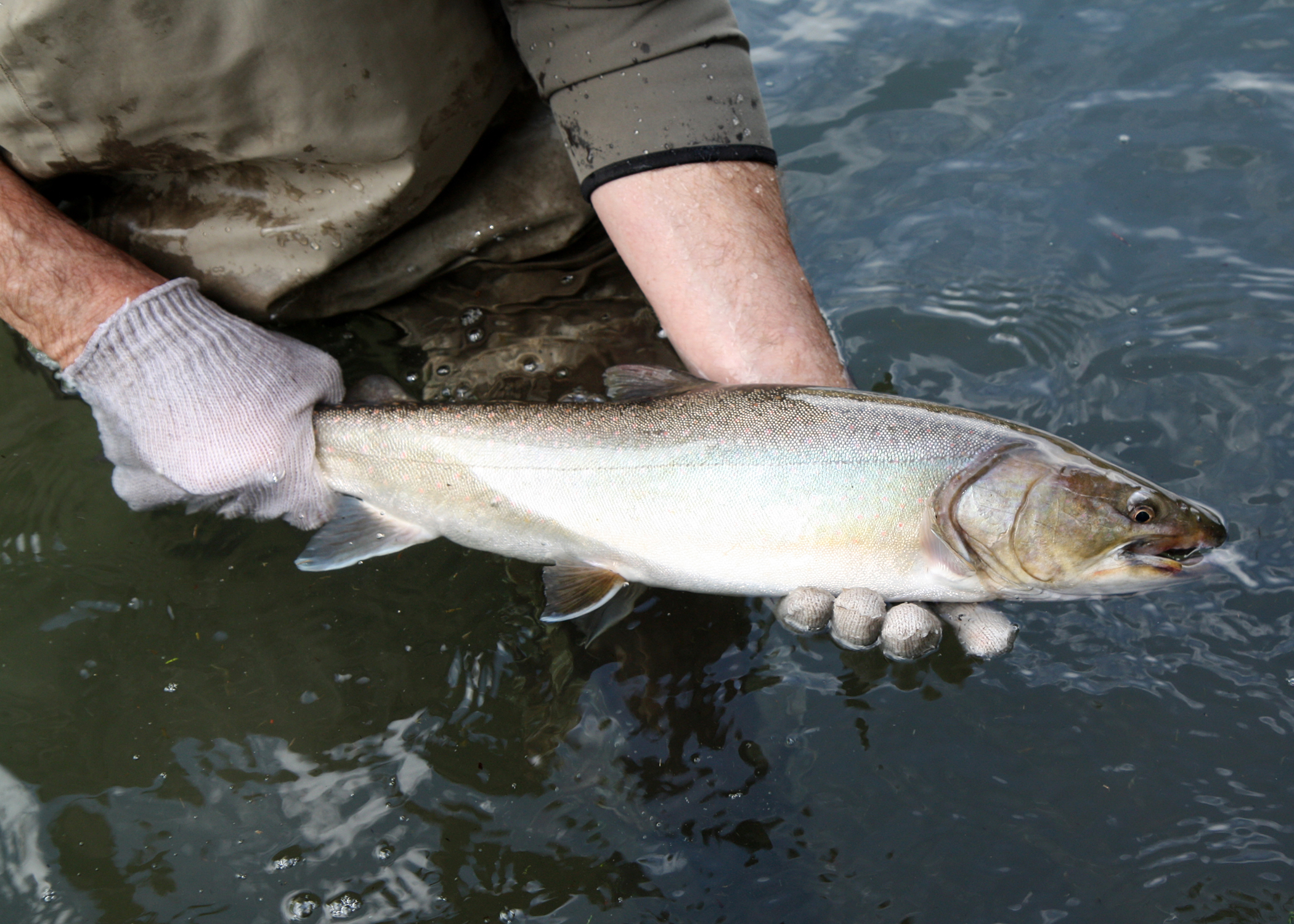
A bull trout

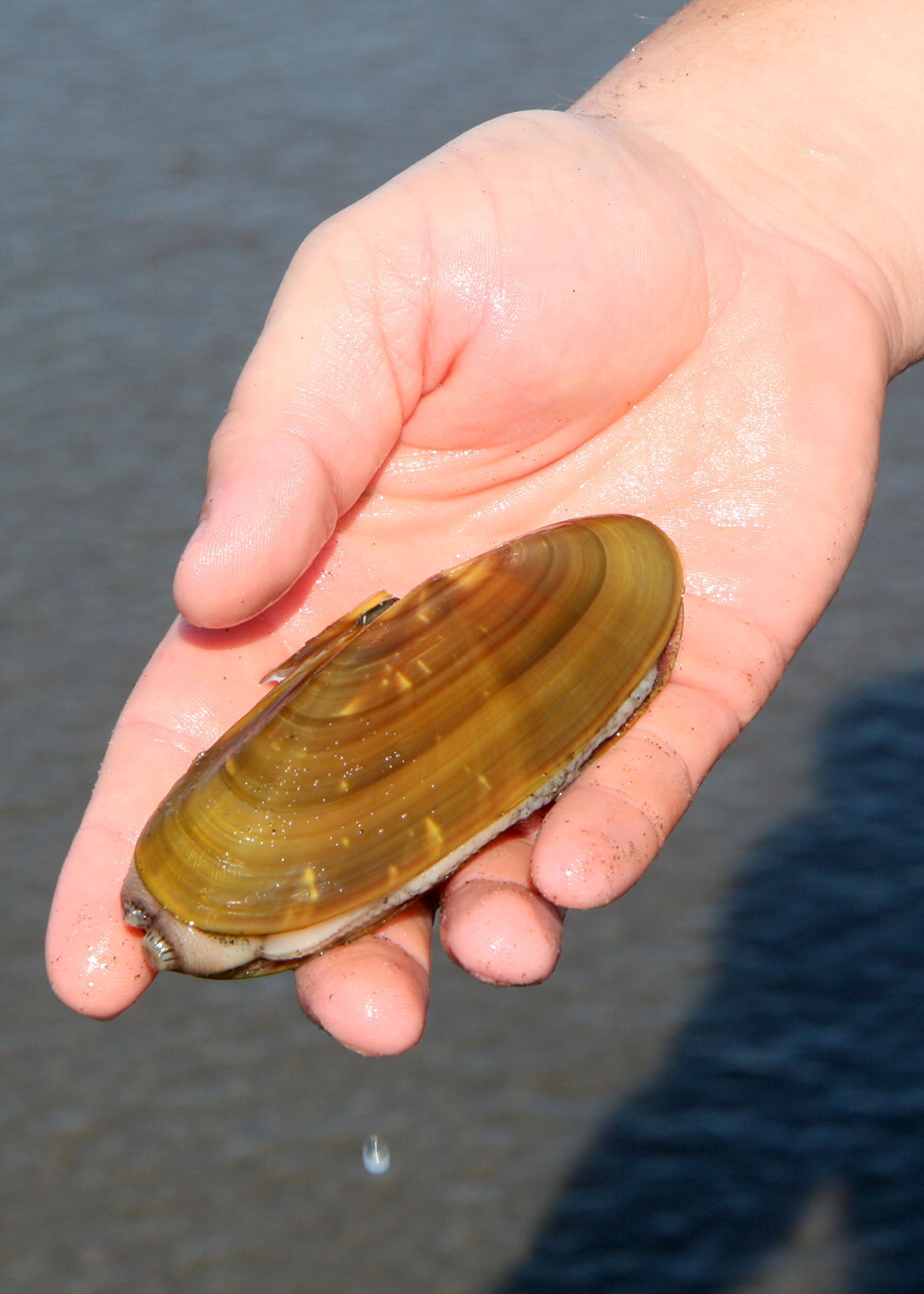
A Pacific razor clam

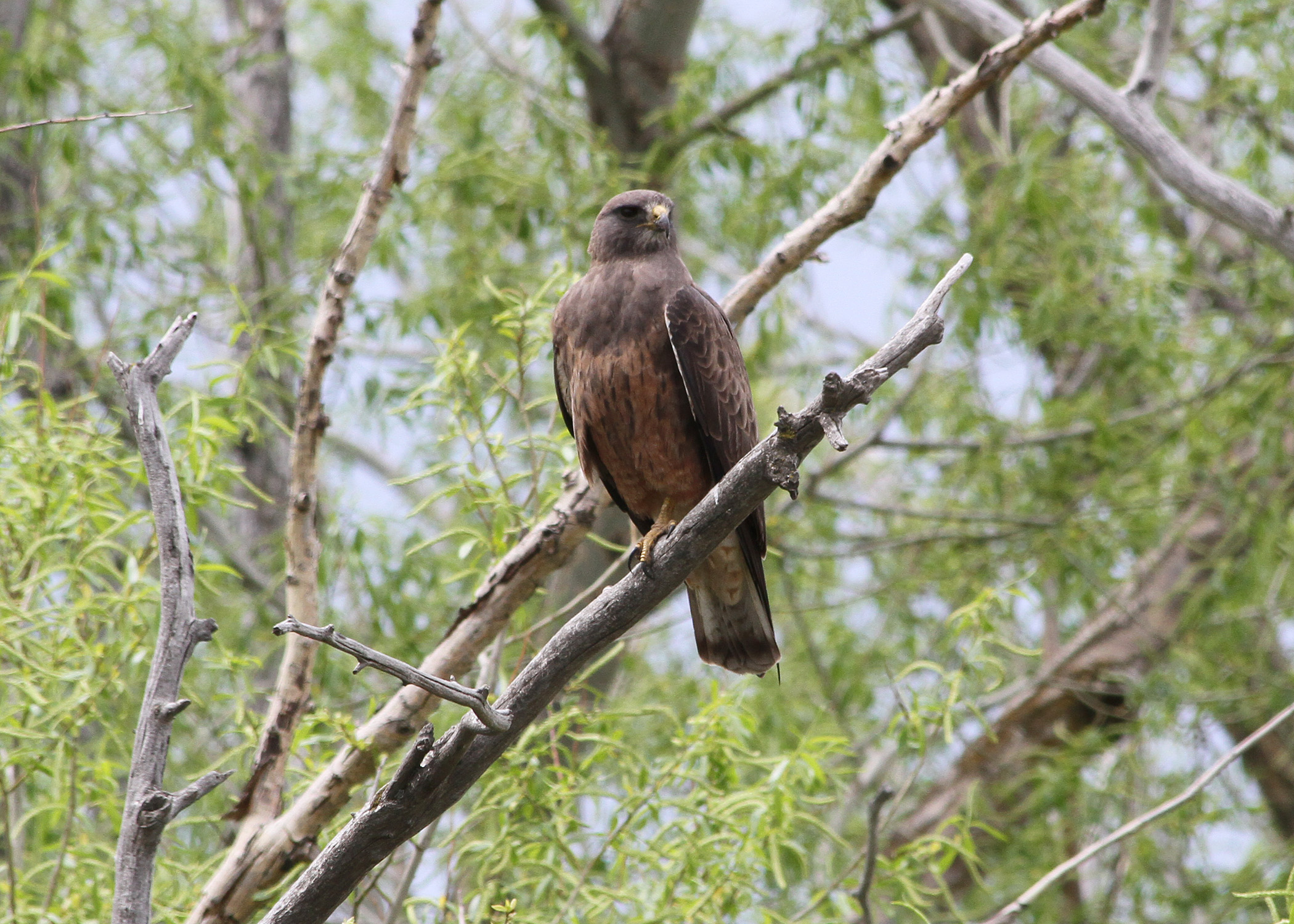
A Swainson's hawk

A study was done in 2008 by ODFW and Travel Oregon to find the results of expenditures made throughout Oregon from residents and nonresidents that participated in the economic significance of fishing, hunting, wildlife viewing, and shellfish harvesting in Oregon. Roughly 2.8 million residents and non-residents participated in either hunting, fishing, wildlife viewing, and shellfish harvesting. 631,000 fished, 282,000 hunted, 175,000 harvested shellfish, and 1.7 million participated in wildlife viewing. During 2008 $2.5 billion in expenditures was made as a result of these activities. All regions of Oregon had benefited from the amount of expenditures made during 2008. Of this report fishing had a response rate of only 18%, hunting had a response rate of 26%, shellfishing had a response rate of 35% and wildlife viewing had a response rate of 62%.

=== Hunting ===
282,000 residents and non-residents participated in hunting in 2008 from this residents and non-resident made travel generated expenditures of $104,458,000, $31,574,000 was spent on local recreation and $381,908,000 was spent from equipment.

=== Fishing ===
631,000 residents and non-residents participated in fishing in 2008 from those that participated they spent a total of $264,605,000 on travel generated expenditures. $76,905,000 was spent on local recreation and $441,356,000 was spent on equipment.

=== Shellfishing ===
175,000 residents and non-residents participated in shellfishing in 2008 from those that participated they spent a total of $31,039,000 on travel generated expenditures. $5,256,000 was spent on local recreation and $135,688,000 was spent on equipment.

=== Wildlife viewing ===
1,700,000 residents and non-residents participated in wildlife viewing in 2008 from those that participated they spent a total of $462,087,000 on travel generated expenditures. $33,173,000 was spent on local recreation and $527,980,000 was spent on equipment.

== Volunteers ==
ODFW relies on about 4000 volunteers to support its programs and the management of wildlife areas. Volunteers lead public workshops about fish and wildlife, teach hunter education, help families learn to fish, teach archery and shooting skills, plant vegetation, build bird nesting boxes, monitor fish and wildlife populations, help biologists learn more about wildlife behavior by trapping, monitoring and recording animal patterns and activity, clean up at fish hatcheries, build sign kiosks, maintain equipment and more. ‌

== Oregon wildlife management units ==
List of units: Note: unit 0 denotes Indian Reservation

Name	unit #	Regional area	Area (acres)	Notes
Saddle Mountain	10	Northwest		Unit 10 map.
Scappoose	11	Northwest		
Wilson	12	Northwest		
Trask	14	Northwest		
Willamette	15	Northwest		
Santiam	16	Northwest		
Stott Mountain	17	Northwest		
Alsea	18	Northwest		
Mckenzie	19	Northwest		
Siuslaw	20	Northwest		
Indigo	21	Southeast		
Dixon	22	Southeast		
Melrose	23	Southeast		
Tiogoa	24	Southeast		
Sixes	25	Southeast		
Powers	26	Southeast		
Chetco	27	Southeast		
Applegate	28	Southeast		
Evans Creek	29	Southeast		
Rogue	30	Southeast		
Keno	31	South Central		
Klamath Falls	32	South Central		
Sprague	33	South Central		
Upper Deschutes	34	Central		
Paulina	35	Central		
Maury:	36	Central		
Ochoco	37	Central		
Grizzly	38	Central		
Metolius	39	Central		Includes Deschutes and Ochoco national forests
Maupin	40	Columbia		
White River	41	Columbia		
Hood	42	Columbia		
Biggs	43	Columbia		
Columbia Basin	44	Northeast		
Fossil	45	Northeast		
Murderers Creek	46	Northeast		
Northside	47	Northeast		
Heppner	48	Northeast		
Ukiah	49	Northeast		
Desolation	50	Northeast		
Sumpter	51	Northeast		
Starkey	52	Northeast		
Catherine Creek	53	Northeast		
Mount Emily	54	Northeast		
Walla Walla	55	Northeast		
Wenaha	56	Northeast		
Sled Springs	57	Northeast		
58 Chesnimnus	58	Northeast		
Snake River	59	Northeast		
Minam	60	Northeast		
Imnaha	61	Northeast		
Pine Creek	62	Northeast		
Keating	63	Northeast		
Lookout Mountain	64	Northeast		
Beulah	65	Northeast		
Malheur River	66	Southeast		
Owyhee	67	Southeast		
Whitehorse	68	Southeast		
Steens Mountain	69	Southeast		
Beaty's Butte	70	Southeast		
Juniper	71	Southeast		
Silvies	72	Southeast		
Wagontire	73	Southeast		
Warner	74	Southeast		
Interstate	75	South Central		
Silver Lake	76	South Central		
Fort Rock	77	South Central		

== State wildlife areas ==
- Bridge Creek Wildlife Area
- Dean Creek Wildlife Area
- Denman Wildlife Area
- E.E. Wilson Wildlife Area
- Elkhorn Wildlife Area
- Fern Ridge Wildlife Area
- Irrigon Wildlife Area
- Jewell Meadows Wildlife Area
- Klamath Wildlife Area
- Ladd Marsh Wildlife Area
- Lower Deschutes Wildlife Area
- Phillip W. Schneider Wildlife Area
- Prineville Reservoir Wildlife Area
- Riverside Wildlife Area
- Sauvie Island Wildlife Area
- Snake River Islands Wildlife Area
- Summer Lake Wildlife Area
- Wenaha Wildlife Area
- White River Wildlife Area
- Willow Creek Wildlife Area

== State marine reserves ==
- Cape Falcon Marine Reserve
- Cascade Head Marine Reserve
- Otter Rock Marine Reserve
- Cape Perpetua Marine Reserve
- Redfish Rocks Marine Reserve

== See also ==
- List of law enforcement agencies in Oregon
- List of state and territorial fish and wildlife management agencies in the United States
