= Crooked River (Oregon) =

River in Oregon, U.S.

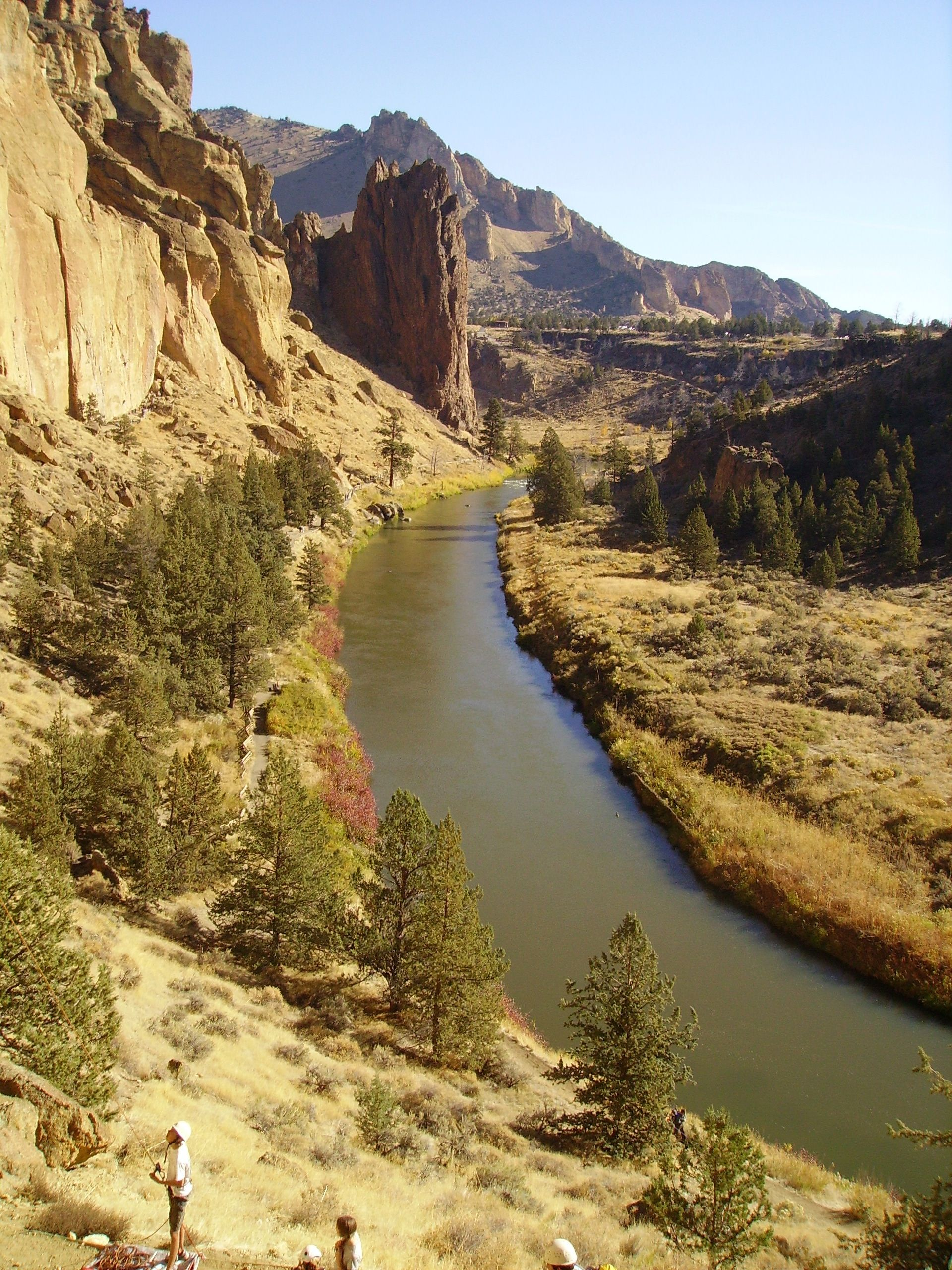
- The Crooked River in Smith Rock State Park

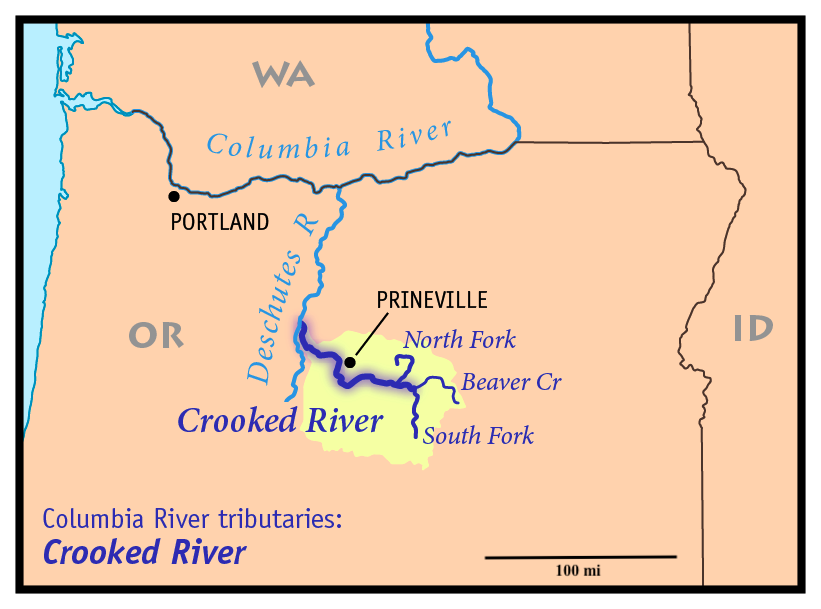
- Map of the Crooked River watershed, its main tributaries and downriver connection to the Columbia River via the Deschutes River.
- Native name: udɨ huudɨ (Northern Paiute)

Location
- Country: United States
- State: Oregon
- Counties: Jefferson, Deschutes, Crook
- City: Prineville

Physical characteristics
- Source: South Fork Crooked River
  - coordinates: 43°38′55″N 120°23′30″W
  - elevation: 4,775 ft (1,455 m)
- Mouth: Deschutes River
  - location: Lake Billy Chinook
  - coordinates: 44°34′25″N 121°16′19″W
  - elevation: 1,950 ft (590 m)
- Length: 125 mi (201 km)
- Basin size: 4,500 sq mi (12,000 km^{2})
- Discharge
  - location: near mouth
  - average: 1,544 cu ft/s (43.7 m^{3}/s)
  - minimum: 656 cu ft/s (18.6 m^{3}/s)
  - maximum: 6,660 cu ft/s (189 m^{3}/s)

Basin features
- Tributaries
  - right: Beaver Creek, North Fork Crooked River, Ochoco Creek

National Wild and Scenic River
- Type: Recreational
- Designated: October 28, 1988

The Crooked River (Northern Paiute: udɨ huudɨ) is a tributary, 125 miles (201 km) long, of the Deschutes River in the U.S. state of Oregon. The river begins at the confluence of the South Fork Crooked River and Beaver Creek in southeastern Crook County. Of the two tributaries, the South Fork Crooked River is the larger and is sometimes considered part of the Crooked River proper. A variant name of the South Fork Crooked River is simply "Crooked River". The Deschutes River flows north into the Columbia River.

== Course ==
The South Fork Crooked River originates in an area called Misery Flat, along the Deschutes County, Lake County and Harney County boundaries, north of Glass Buttes. The South Fork's tributaries drain Hampton Buttes to the west and Mackey Butte to the east. The South Fork Crooked River flows north for 76 miles (122 km), collecting tributaries including Buck Creek and Twelvemile Creek before joining Beaver Creek to form the Crooked River proper near Paulina in Crook County.

Beaver Creek arises in two forks, North Fork and South Fork Beaver Creek, in Grant County. South Fork Beaver Creek drains the slopes of Snow Mountain and Funny Butte before joining the North Fork. Beaver Creek then flows west through Paulina Valley and is joined by Grindstone Creek just upstream from Paulina. Downstream of Paulina, Beaver Creek joins the South Fork Crooked River to form the Crooked River proper.

From the confluence of the South Fork and Beaver Creek, the Crooked River flows west, collecting the tributary Camp Creek from the south and then the North Fork Crooked River from the north. The North Fork Crooked River arises in Big Summit Prairie on the southern side of the Ochoco Mountains.

Below the North Fork confluence, the Crooked River continues flowing west, between the Ochoco Mountains to the north and the Maury Mountains to the south. The river passes Post, the geographic center of Oregon. Then, at about river mile 87 (river kilometer 140), the river flows into Prineville Reservoir, created by Bowman Dam (also called Prineville Dam). Below the dam, the river bends northward to Prineville, Oregon, where it is joined by Ochoco Creek from the northeast. Like the North Fork, Ochoco Creek drains the Ochoco Mountains. After Prineville, the Crooked River flows northwest, collecting McKay Creek and several other minor tributaries before emptying into Lake Billy Chinook, an impoundment of the Deschutes River created by Round Butte Dam. The dam also impounds the lower reach of the Crooked River. The Crooked River enters the Deschutes River about 114 miles (183 km) upstream from the larger river's confluence with the Columbia River, to the north.

Some of the Crooked River's drainage basin lies within the Ochoco National Forest and the Crooked River National Grassland. A 17.8-mile (28.6 km) stretch of the river, from the national grassland boundary to Dry Creek, was classified as a recreational part of the National Wild and Scenic Rivers System in 1988. Most of the North Fork Crooked River is also part of the wild and scenic system.

Bridges over the Crooked River include the Crooked River Railroad Bridge owned by BNSF Railway, the Rex T. Barber Veterans Memorial Bridge that carries U.S. Route 97, and a second railroad bridge that carries the city of Prineville railway.

== History ==
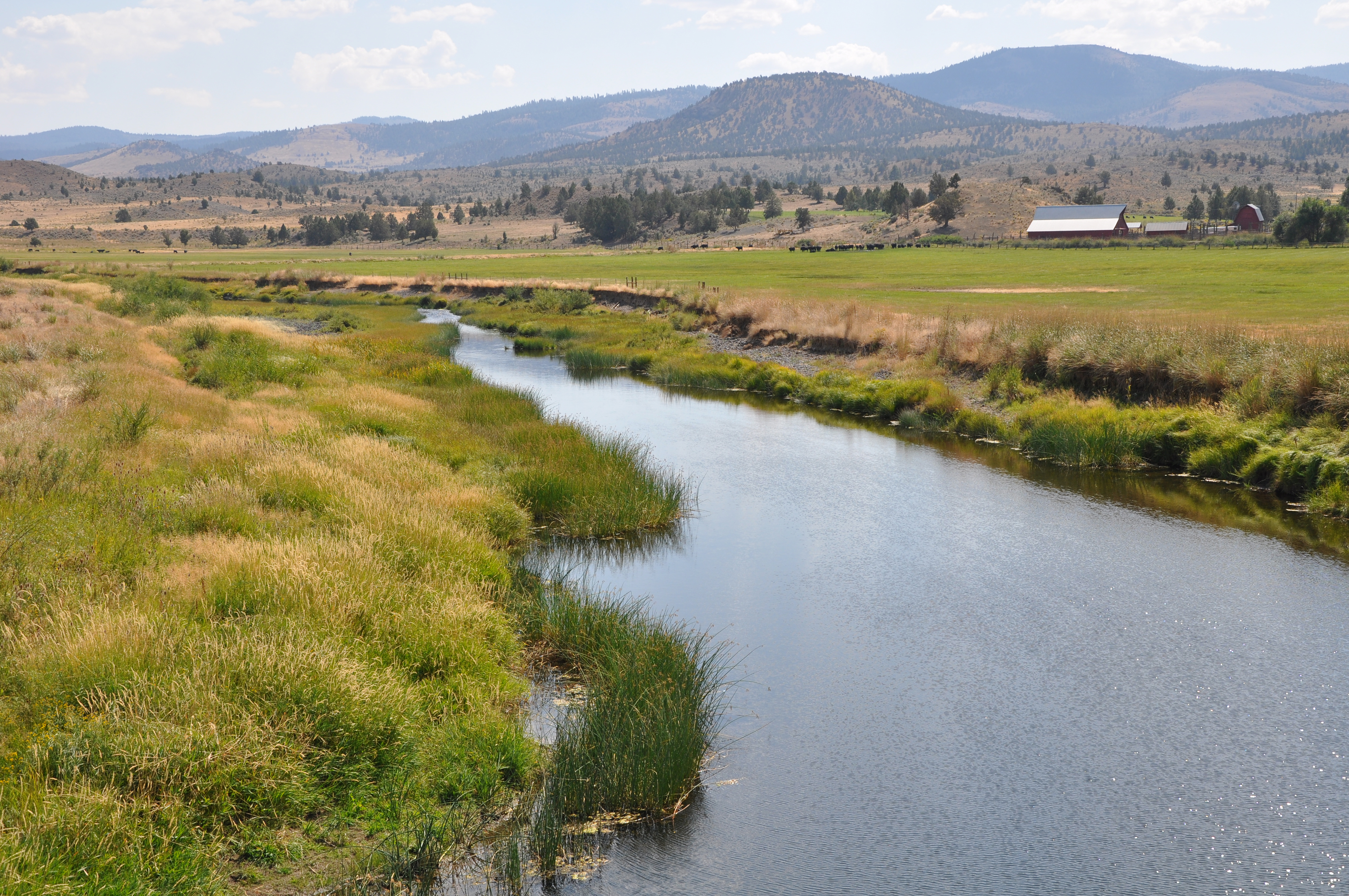
Upper river near Post

Prior to European settlement, the Northern Paiute called the river udɨ huudɨ, which means "deep canyon creek."

The Crooked River and its tributaries were once a major spawning ground for anadromous fish such as spring Chinook salmon, steelhead trout, and Pacific lamprey. Non-migratory fish such as Columbia River redband trout and bull trout, as well as various non-game fish were also abundant. Fish populations began to drop in the early 19th century due to irrigation withdrawals.

Early explorers described the lower Crooked River's floodplain as large and filled with waist-high grasses and willow trees ("Ochoco" is a Paiute word for "willow"). Beaver were also plentiful, especially on the upper river and tributaries, thus fur trappers frequented the region until the beaver were depleted.

The Cove Power Plant on the lower Crooked River, built around 1910, effectively blocked upriver migration of spring Chinook Salmon during low streamflow conditions. In addition, Ochoco Dam, built in 1920 on Ochoco Creek, blocked fish passage completely. Round Butte Dam, built in the 1950s on the Deschutes River below the Crooked River confluence, included fish passage facilities. But attempts to pass anadromous fish failed by the late 1960s, thus blocking migratory fish, such as salmon, from historic spawning and rearing habitat in the Crooked River basin. Redband trout are the only native game fish left in the Crooked River basin. There are efforts currently underway to reestablish fish passage at the dam. Some hatchery fish have been introduced in an attempt to mitigate the losses.

Water diversion in the Crooked River basin for irrigation agriculture began in the 19th century. Two large reservoirs were built to supply irrigation water during the summer growing season: Prineville Reservoir on the Crooked River and Ochoco Reservoir on Ochoco Creek. Today, irrigation diversions during the summer remove most of the Crooked River's flow below Prineville.

== Recreation ==
=== Fishing ===
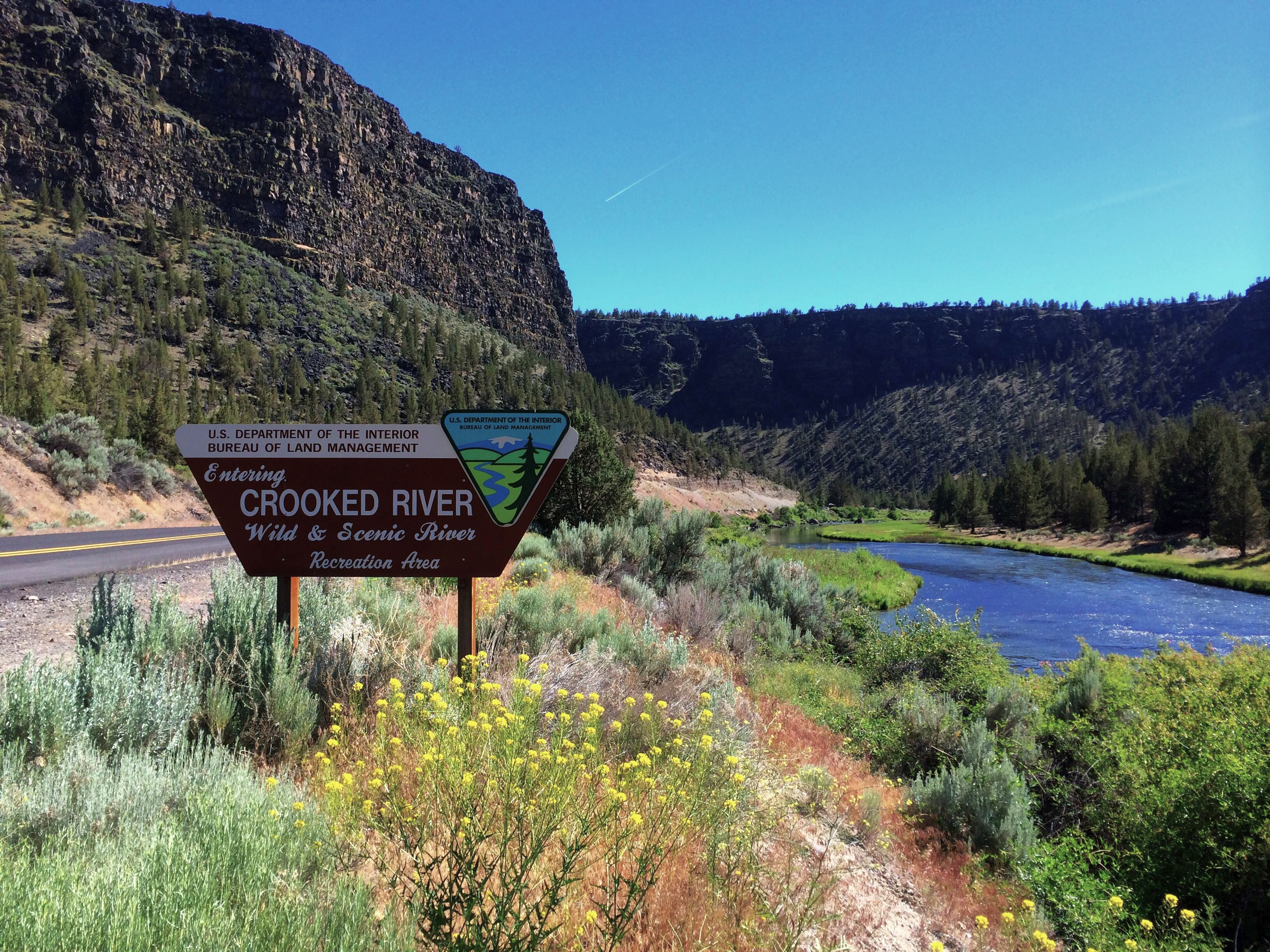
Lower Crooked Wild and Scenic River Recreation Area

Fishing along the main stem above Prineville Reservoir is generally poor. Fish populations there have been adversely affected by irrigation withdrawals, drought, and degraded riparian zones.

The reservoir, which is 15 miles (24 km) long and covers 3,000 acres (1,200 ha), supports populations of rainbow trout, smallmouth bass, largemouth bass, catfish, crappie, and crayfish. It is open to fishing year-round from boats or from the shore.

The situation below Bowman Dam, which creates the reservoir, is quite different. According to Fishing in Oregon, the Crooked River is "one of the most productive trout streams in Oregon." Most productive are the 7 miles (11 km) of easily accessible stream below the dam. This stretch of water, kept cool by water releases from the reservoir, supports large populations of redband trout. Open all year to fly fishing, this "classic tail-water fishery" is about an hour's drive from Bend. Another stretch of good fishing can be found in the Crooked River Gorge further downstream, but access is more difficult.

=== Camping ===
Prineville Reservoir State Park has two developed campgrounds as well primitive sites along the 43-mile (69 km) shore of the lake created by Bowman Dam. Choices range from tent sites to hookup sites for recreational vehicles (RVs) to log cabins "with full amenities". The park is open for camping and day use year-round. Adjacent to the state park and its camping areas is the Prineville Reservoir Wildlife Area, managed by the Oregon Department of Fish and Wildlife and the Bureau of Reclamation, which is open for dispersed camping as well as water activities, hiking, and wildlife viewing.

The Lower Crooked Wild and Scenic River flows through 2,300 acres (930 ha) of public lands overseen by the Bureau of Land Management and 220 acres (89 ha) overseen by the Bureau of Reclamation. The Chimney Rock segment below Bowman Dam has nine developed campsites, seven of which are meant for single-family camping, and two that are multi-family or group sites. All are fee sites; all have toilets; only one, Chimney Rock, has drinking water. Opposite the Chimney Rock Campground is the trailhead for Chimney Rock Trail, which winds up a side canyon for 1.3 miles (2.1 km) to higher-elevation views of the main canyon and the Cascade Range. The BLM also oversees two day-use sites along this stretch of the river. All of these installations are connected by Oregon Route 27, which follows the river between the dam and Prineville.

Near Terrebonne, downstream of Prineville, Smith Rock State Park has an open area for tent camping. RV camping, open fires, and sleeping in cars are not allowed. The park is open for tenting and day use year-round.

=== Boating ===
Prineville Reservoir and its state park are used for boating and related activities including kayaking, paddle boating, waterskiing, wakeboarding, and windsurfing. The state park has 32 boat moorages available during summer.

An 8-mile (13 km) stretch of the river below Bowman Dam is suitable for canoeing when the river is not too crowded with anglers. Downstream of Prineville, expert kayakers sometimes run an 18-mile (29 km) segment rated class 4 to 5 on the International Scale of River Difficulty and below that another stretch of 9 miles (14 km) rated class 4.

=== Other ===
Ochoco State Scenic Viewpoint, on a butte overlooking Prineville, has views of the Crooked River and the Ochoco Mountains. The 251-acre (102 ha) park includes an area with rare plants.

Smith Rock State Park, off U.S. Route 97 about 3 miles (5 km) east of Terrebonne, has thousands of rock climbing routes as well as hiking and biking trails in a rugged canyon setting. The ancestral Crooked River helped create the crags and pinnacles in this park by eroding the interior of a volcanic vent over millions of years. In addition to the climbing routes, many of which are highly challenging, the park is open to swimming, fishing, photography, picnicking, and wildlife viewing. Amenities include restrooms with showers. The park covers more than 600 acres (240 ha) among large bends in the river, and its trail system totals more than 7 miles (11 km).

Along Route 97, about 9 miles (14 km) north of Redmond and downstream of Smith Rock is the Peter Skene Ogden State Scenic Viewpoint overlooking the Crooked River Gorge. The gorge at this point is about 300 feet (90 m) deep and 400 feet (120 m) wide. Amenities at this day-use park include picnic tables and restrooms.

The Cove Palisades State Park along Lake Billy Chinook is a complex of day-use areas, campgrounds, cabins, and a marina and restaurant along the lake arms that include the Crooked and Deschutes rivers. The park, which covers more than 4,000 acres (1,600 ha), has a wide variety of amenities such as houseboat rentals, an amphitheater, basketball hoops, and a camp store. The Crooked River Campground within the park opens in spring and closes at the end of September, while a companion Crooked River day-use area is open all year.

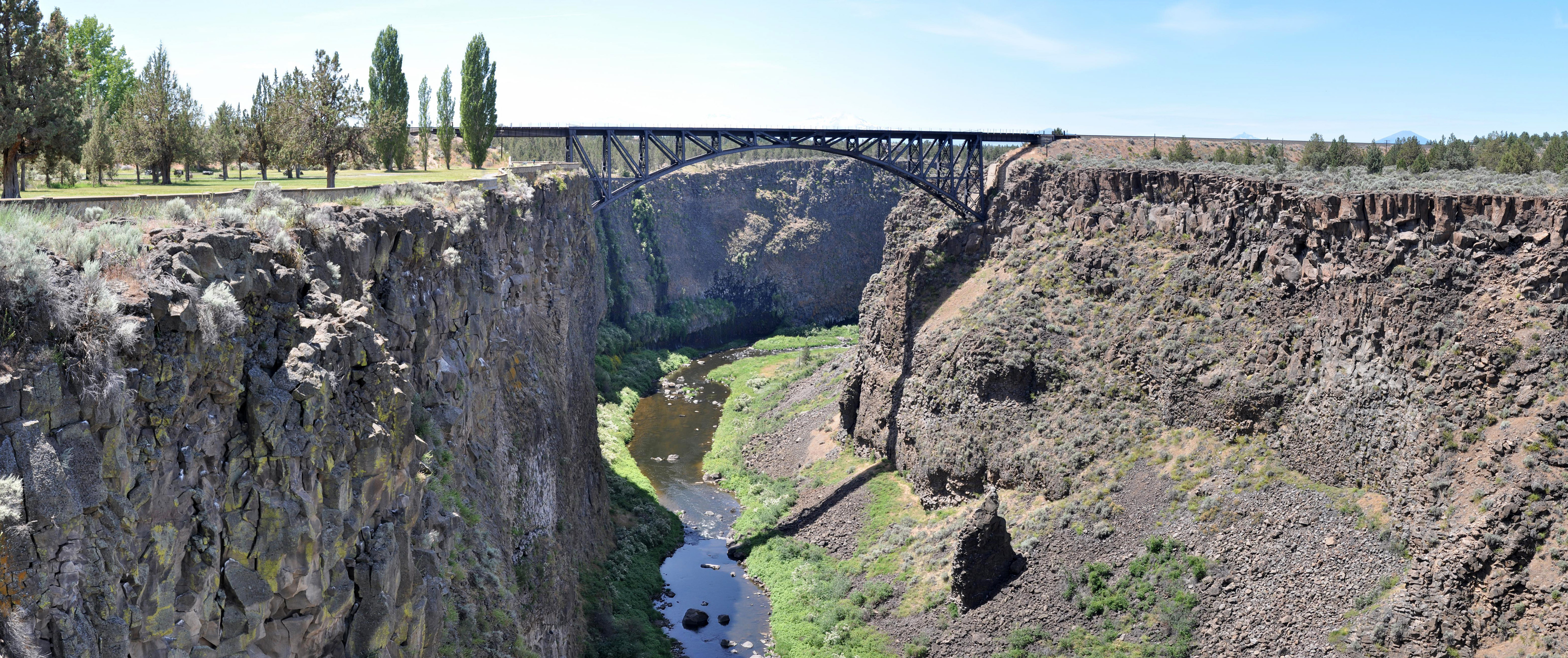
Crooked River Railroad Bridge spanning the canyon at Peter Skene Ogden State Scenic Viewpoint along U.S. Route 97

== See also ==
- List of rivers in Oregon
- List of longest streams of Oregon
