= Crooked River Gorge =

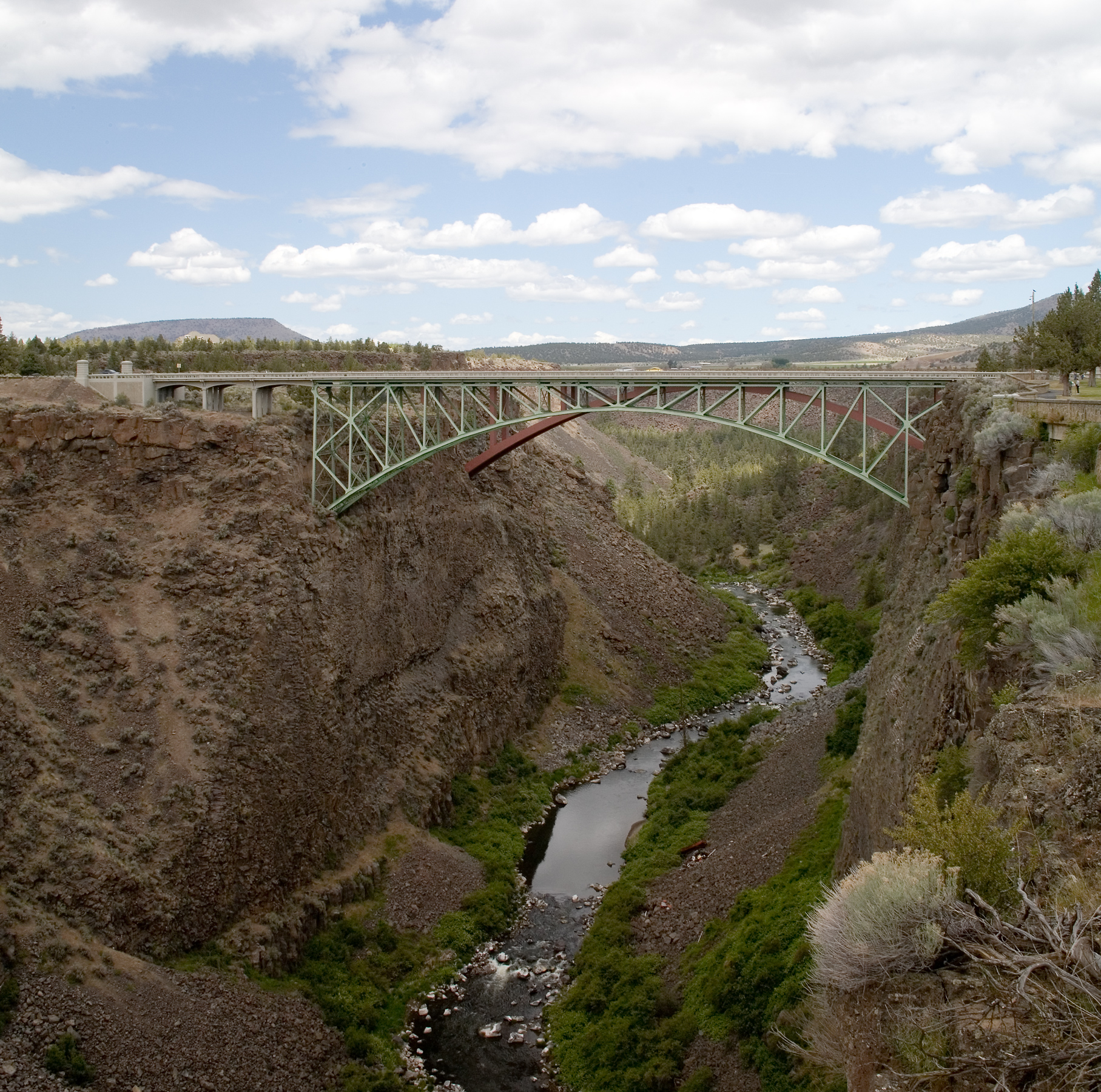
- Bridges crossing Crooked River Gorge
- Interactive map of Crooked River Gorge
- Location: Jefferson County, Oregon, Oregon, United States
- Coordinates: 44.4167°N 121.2310°W
- Length: 15 km (9.3 mi)

Crooked River Gorge is a 500-foot-deep (150 m) gorge located around Warm Springs and Smith Rock State Park, Central Oregon, United States. The gorge is surrounded by 400-foot (120 m) cliffs filled with a variety of wildlife. The upper part of the Crooked River Gorge, which are also popular among climbers, are made of columnar basalt cliffs eroded by the Crooked River since the Newberry volcanic eruption 1.2 million years ago.
