= Prineville Reservoir Wildlife Area =

Protected area in Oregon

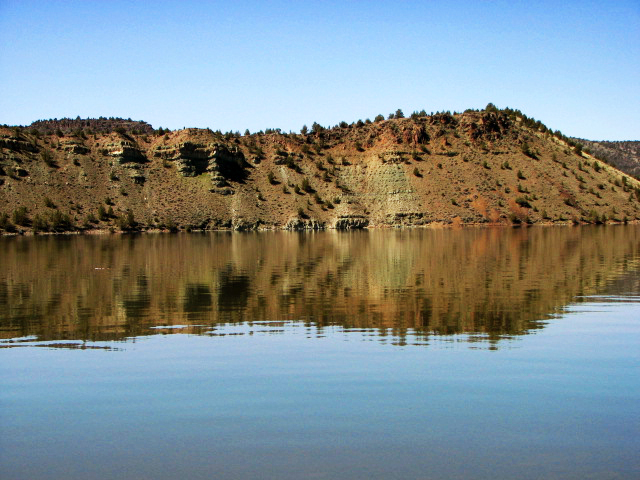
- The namesake reservoir

- Location within Oregon
- Nearest city: Prineville, Oregon
- Coordinates: 44°08′33″N 120°44′44″W
- Owner: Oregon Department of Fish and Wildlife
- Website: ODFW

Prineville Reservoir Wildlife Area is a wildlife area near Prineville, Oregon. It is administered by the Oregon Department of Fish and Wildlife. It also borders Prineville Reservoir State Park. Wildlife visible includes bald eagles, golden eagles, mule deer, and osprey. Fish include largemouth bass, rainbow trout, and smallmouth bass.
