= Crooked River High Bridge =

Crooked River (High) Bridge
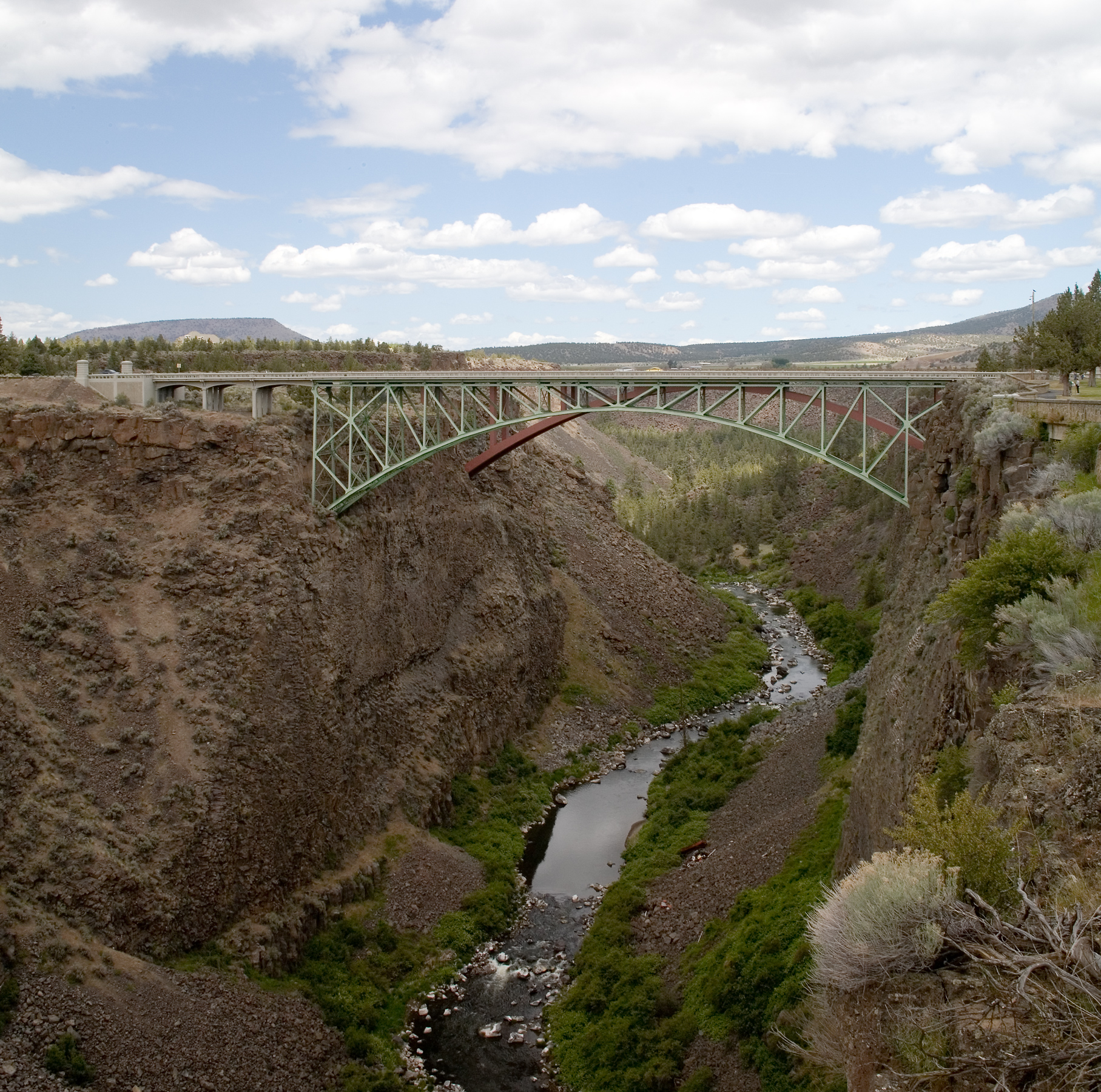
- Crooked River High Bridge with Rex T. Barber Veterans Memorial Bridge visible behind
- Coordinates: 44°23′33″N 121°11′39″W
- Carries: US 97
- Crosses: Crooked River
- Locale: Jefferson County, Oregon

Characteristics
- Design: steel deck arch
- Total length: 464 ft (141 m)
- Longest span: 330 ft (100 m)

History
- Opened: 1926

The Crooked River High Bridge is a steel arch bridge that spans the Crooked River gorge in Jefferson County, Oregon. The bridge was designed by Conde McCullough and was completed in 1926. Shortly after its completion, Oregon State Highway Division created the Peter Skene Ogden Park just to the south of the bridge.

The bridge has a total length of 464 feet (141 m) with a main span of 330 feet (100 m). The deck is 295 feet (90 m) above the canyon floor. The bridge was eventually unable to keep up with the growing traffic demands of US 97 (US 97), and was replaced by the wider Rex T. Barber Veterans Memorial Bridge in 2000. The old bridge is open to pedestrians.

== See also ==
- List of bridges documented by the Historic American Engineering Record in Oregon
- List of bridges in the United States by height
