= Hampton Buttes =

Mountain range in Oregon

- Location within Oregon

Highest point
- Peak: Hampton Butte
- Elevation: 6,352 ft (1,936 m)
- Coordinates: 43°46′28″N 120°16′56″W

Geography
- Country: United States
- State: Oregon
- Districts: Crook County and Deschutes County
- Topo map(s): USGS Hampton Butte, Hampton, West of Hampton, Long Barn

Hampton Buttes is a small range of mountains or hills in the U.S. state of Oregon. The range lies mostly in Crook County but extends south and west into Deschutes County in Central Oregon near the unincorporated community of Hampton. U.S. Route 20, an east–west highway, skirts the range to the south. The upper South Fork Crooked River flows north along the eastern base of the range.

The highest peak in the range is Hampton Butte, elevation 6,352 feet (1,936 m) above sea level. The peak, the range, and the unincorporated community of Hampton or Hampton Station, were named for a local resident, Joe Hampton, who moved from near Eugene to this area in 1870.

The Bureau of Land Management (BLM) oversees two wilderness study areas (WSA) at Hampton Buttes under the National Landscape Conservation System. WSAs are public lands under consideration by the U.S. Congress for wilderness protection. Hampton Butte WSA covers 10,600 acres (4,300 ha), while Cougar Well WSA, further south, covers 17,315 acres (7,007 ha). The BLM also oversees a rockhounding area at Hampton Buttes that is known for its petrified wood.
