= Rex T. Barber Veterans Memorial Bridge =

Arch bridge across Crooked River in Jefferson County, Oregon

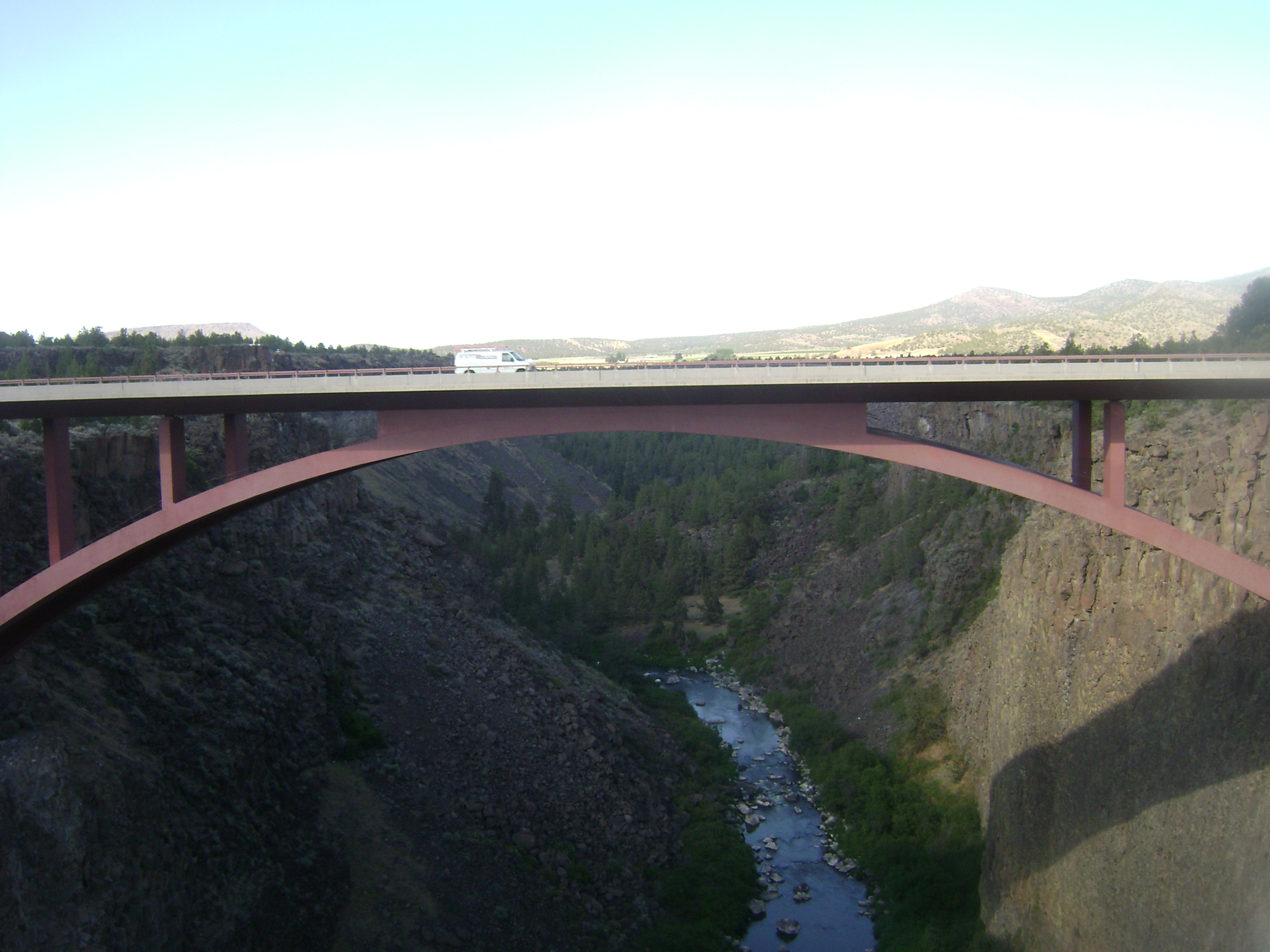
- View from west in August 2011
- Coordinates: 44.393°N 121.193°W
- Carries: US 97
- Crosses: Crooked River
- Locale: Jefferson County, Oregon

Characteristics
- Design: concrete arch
- Total length: 535 ft (163.1 m)
- Longest span: 410 ft (125.0 m)
- Clearance below: 300 ft (91.4 m)

History
- Construction start: 1998
- Opened: 2000

Location
- Interactive map of Rex T. Barber; Veterans Memorial Bridge

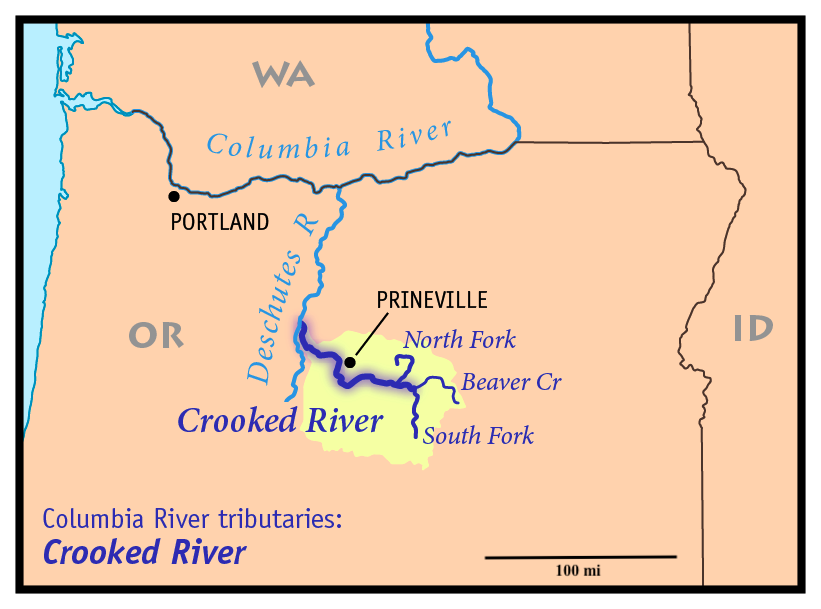
Crooked River in central Oregon

The Rex T. Barber Veterans Memorial Bridge is a concrete arch bridge in the western United States; it spans the Crooked River gorge in Jefferson County in central Oregon. Designed by T. Y. Lin International, the bridge was completed in 2000 to replace the Crooked River High Bridge. Parallel and west, the older bridge was built in 1926 and was not wide enough to accommodate increased traffic on US 97.

The bridge has a total length of 535 ft (163 m), an arch span of 410 ft (125 m), and is situated 300 ft (91 m) above the canyon floor. The elevation of the road deck is approximately 2,770 feet (840 m) above sea level. It was the first bridge in the United States to use a cast-in-place segmental method of construction.

Initially named the Crooked River Bridge, it was renamed in 2003 for Rex T. Barber (1917–2001), a native of the area. A World War II fighter pilot in the Pacific Theater, Barber shot down the plane carrying Japanese Admiral Isoroku Yamamoto in 1943.

== See also ==
- List of bridges documented by the Historic American Engineering Record in Oregon
- List of bridges in the United States by height
