= Hampton, Deschutes County, Oregon =

Unincorporated community in the state of Oregon, United States

Hampton, Oregon
- Unincorporated community
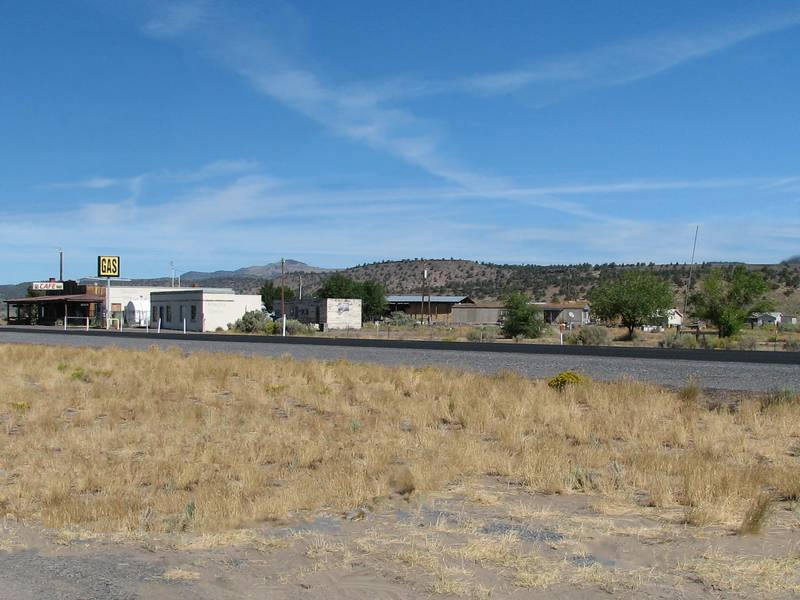
- Hampton looking north across US 20
- Nickname: Hampton Station
- Location in the state of Oregon Hampton (the United States)
- Coordinates: 43°40′25.11″N 120°14′10.43″W
- Country: United States
- State: Oregon
- County: Deschutes
- Elevation: 4,419 ft (1,346.9 m)
- Time zone: UTC-8 (Pacific)
  - Summer (DST): UTC-7 (Pacific)
- ZIP code: 97712
- Area code: 541

Hampton is an unincorporated community in Deschutes County, Oregon, United States. It lies about 60 miles (97 km) southeast of Bend, on U.S. Route 20, on the edge of the High Desert.

== History ==
Hampton was named for the Hampton Buttes, which in turn were named for Joe Hampton, who moved to the area from Eugene in the 1870s. Hampton post office was established in 1911 and closed in 1953, after one intermission. In 1940 Hampton had a population of 41. As of 2003, Hampton, also known as Hampton Station, had a gas station and a restaurant. By 2010, the gas station had closed. As of at least October 22, 2020 it is confirmed to be open again.

== Transportation ==
In the 21st century, Hampton is a stop on the Eastern POINT intercity bus line between Bend and Ontario. It makes one stop per day in each direction.
