= Dry Creek =

Dry Creek may refer to:

== Communities ==
=== Australia ===
- Dry Creek, South Australia, a suburb of Adelaide

=== United States ===
- Dry Creek, Alaska, a census-designated place
- Dry Creek, Louisiana, an unincorporated community
- Dry Creek, Oklahoma, a census-designated place
- Dry Creek, West Virginia, an unincorporated community

== Watercourses ==
=== Australia ===
- Dry Creek (Australian Capital Territory), a tributary of the Gudgenby River
- Dry Creek (Bylong River tributary), a tributary of the Bylong River in New South Wales
- Dry Creek (Krui River tributary), a tributary of the Krui River in New South Wales
- Dry Creek (South Australia), a seasonal stream in South Australia

=== Canada ===
- Dry Creek (Lake Erie), a watershed administered by the Long Point Region Conservation Authority, that drains into Lake Erie

=== United States ===
==== California ====
- Dry Creek (Butte County), flowing into the Sacramento River via the Cherokee Canal; see California State Route 149
- Dry Creek (Fresno County, California); see List of dams and reservoirs in California
- Dry Creek (Mokelumne River tributary)
- Dry Creek (Steelhead Creek tributary)
- Dry Creek (San Mateo County, California), a tributary of Tunitas Creek
- Dry Creek (Sonoma County, California), a tributary of the Russian River
- Dry Creek (Tuolumne River tributary)
- Dry Creek (near Woodside, California), a tributary of Bear Creek
- Dry Creek (Yuba River tributary), a tributary of the Yuba River

==== Minnesota ====
- Dry Creek (Big Piney River tributary)
- Dry Creek (Cottonwood River tributary)

==== Missouri ====
- Dry Creek (Big Creek tributary)
- Dry Creek (Big River (Missouri)), a tributary of the Big River
- Dry Creek (Flat Creek tributary)
- Dry Creek (Flat River tributary)
- Dry Creek (Huzzah Creek tributary)
- Dry Creek (James River tributary)
- Dry Creek (Jefferson County, Missouri), a tributary of the Big River
- Dry Creek (Twelvemile Creek tributary)

==== North Carolina ====
- Dry Creek (Haw River tributary)
- Dry Creek (Cape Fear River tributary), a stream in Harnett County, North Carolina

==== Oregon ====
- Dry Creek (Crooked Creek tributary), a tributary of Crooked Creek
- Dry Creek (Oregon), several other streams

==== Other states ====
- Dry Creek (Tennessee River tributary), a stream in Alabama and Tennessee
- Dry Creek (Georgia)
- Dry Creek (Kentucky), a tributary of the Ohio River
- Dry Brook, a tributary of the Paulins Kill in New Jersey
- Dry Brook (disambiguation), various streams in New Jersey and New York
- Dry Creek (Martins Creek tributary), a stream in Pennsylvania
- Dry Creek (Hyco River tributary), a stream in Virginia

=== Multiple countries ===
- Dry River (disambiguation)

== Other uses ==
=== Australia ===
- Dry Creek railway station, near Adelaide, South Australia

=== United States ===
- Dry Creek (RTD), a transit station in Centennial, Colorado
- Dry Creek Airpark, a private-use airport in Prineville, Oregon
- Dry Creek Archeological Site, a National Historic Landmark in Alaska
- Dry Creek Joint Elementary School District, California
- Dry Creek School (Manhattan, Montana), a historic one-room schoolhouse
- Dry Creek Valley AVA, a wine region in Sonoma County, California

== See also ==
- Arroyo (creek), a type of dry creek
- Wadi, a type of dry creek, most commonly found in the Middle East
- Big Dry Creek (disambiguation)
- Dry Fork (disambiguation)
- Dry Run (disambiguation)
- Dry (disambiguation)
