= Dry run =

Dry run may refer to:

- Dry run (testing), a testing process
- Dry run (terrorism), an act by a terrorist organization or individual to examine the reaction to an attempted attack

== Places in the United States ==
=== Settlements ===
- Dry Run, Ohio, a census-designated place in Hamilton County
- Dry Run, Scioto County, Ohio, an unincorporated community
- Dry Run, Pennsylvania, an unincorporated community
- Dry Run, West Virginia, an unincorporated community

=== Streams ===
- Dry Run (Lehigh River tributary) in Pennsylvania
- Dry Run (Susquehecka Creek tributary) in Pennsylvania
- Dry Run (West Branch Susquehanna River tributary) in Pennsylvania
- Dry Fork (Cheat River tributary), or Dry Run, in West Virginia

== Arts and entertainment ==
- Dark Waters (2019 film) (working title: Dry Run), an American film
- Dry Run, a 2010 film featuring Diora Baird
- "Dry Run" (Alfred Hitchcock Presents), a television episode
- "Dry Run" (Drifters), a 2013 television episode
- "The Dry Run" (Mad About You), a television episode
- "Dry Run", a short story by Larry Niven collected in Convergent Series
- "Dry Run", a song by Acid King from Zoroaster
- "Dry Run", a song by Dark Tranquillity from Character
- "Dry Run", a song by Ghoti Hook from Sumo Surprise

== See also ==
- Arroyo (creek), an intermittently dry creek
- Dry Creek (disambiguation)
- Dry Fork (disambiguation)
- Dry River (disambiguation)
