= Dry Fork =

Dry Fork or Dryfork may refer to:

== Rivers ==
- Dry Fork (Bourbeuse River tributary), a stream in Gasconade and Maries counties Missouri
- Dry Fork (Cedar Creek tributary), a stream in Callaway County, Missouri
- Dry Fork (Charrette Creek tributary), a stream in Warren County, Missouri
- Dry Fork (Grassy Creek tributary), a stream in Pike County, Missouri
- Dry Fork (Loutre River tributary), a stream in Montgomery County, Missouri
- Dry Fork (Meramec River tributary), a stream in Crawford, Dent and Phelps counties Missouri
- Dry Fork (North Moreau Creek tributary), a stream in Moniteau County, Missouri
- Dry Fork (Plattin Creek tributary), a stream in Jefferson, St. Francois and Ste. Genevieve counties in Missouri
- Dry Fork (Pomme de Terre River tributary), a stream in Polk County, Missouri
- Dry Fork (Salt River tributary), a stream in Ralls County, Missouri
- Dry Fork (White Oak Creek tributary), a stream in Pittsylvania County, Virginia
- Dry Fork (Cheat River tributary), Dry Fork of the Cheat River in West Virginia
- Dry Fork (Tug Fork tributary), Dry Fork of the Tug Fork in Virginia and West Virginia

== Communities ==
- Dry Fork, Kentucky
- Dry Fork, Pittsylvania County, Virginia
- Dry Fork, West Virginia
- Dry Fork Township, Carroll County, Arkansas

== Other ==
- Dry Fork Mine, a coal mine located in Gillette, Wyoming
- Dry Fork Plantation
