= Dry =

Dry or dryness most often refers to:

- Lack of rainfall, which may refer to
  - Arid regions
  - Drought
- Dry or dry area, relating to legal prohibition of selling, serving, or imbibing alcoholic beverages
- Dry humor, deadpan
- Dryness (medical)
- Dryness (taste), the lack of sugar in a drink, especially an alcoholic one
- Dry direct sound without reverberation

Dry or DRY may also refer to:

== Places ==
- Dry Brook (disambiguation), various rivers
- Dry Creek (disambiguation), various rivers and towns
- Dry, Loiret, a commune of the Loiret département in France
- Dry River (disambiguation), various rivers and towns

== Art, entertainment, and media ==
=== Film and television ===
- Dry (2014 film), a Nigerian film directed by Stephanie Linus
- Dry (2022 film), an Italian film directed by Paolo Virzì
- The Dry (film), a 2020 film directed by Robert Connolly and based on the novel by Jane Harper
  - Force of Nature: The Dry 2, a 2024 sequel film
- The Dry (TV series), an Irish TV series

=== Literature ===
- Dry (memoir), a 2003 memoir by Augusten Burroughs
- The Dry (novel), a 2016 novel by Jane Harper
- Dry, a 2018 novel by Jarrod and Neal Shusterman

=== Music ===
- Dry (group), a Cantopop music duo
- Dry (album), by PJ Harvey, 1992
- "Dry", a song by PJ Harvey from the 1993 album Rid of Me
- "Dry" (song), by Rancid Eddie, 2021
- "Dry", a song by Kutless from their self-titled album
- "Dry", a song by Welsh band Feeder from the 1999 album Yesterday Went Too Soon

== Organizations ==
- Asociación Democracia Real Ya
- Plataforma ¡Democracia Real YA!
- Wets and dries, a faction in the British Conservative Party

== Technology and computing ==
- Don't repeat yourself (DRY), a software development principle
- Dry cell, a type of battery

== Other uses ==
- Dry (surname), a surname
- Dry (rapper) (born 1977), real name Landry Delica, rapper of Congolese origin
