= Rattlesnake Creek (Oregon) =

- Location of the mouth of Rattlesnake Creek in Oregon

Location
- Country: United States
- State: Oregon
- County: Malheur

Physical characteristics
- Source
  - location: near McDermitt
  - coordinates: 42°16′55″N 117°40′10″W
  - elevation: 6,439 ft (1,963 m)
- Mouth: Crooked Creek
  - location: near Burns Junction
  - coordinates: 42°43′24″N 117°47′42″W
  - elevation: 3,770 ft (1,150 m)
- Length: 57 mi (92 km)
- Basin size: 298 sq mi (770 km^{2})

Rattlesnake Creek is a tributary, 57 miles (92 km) long, of Crooked Creek in the U.S. state of Oregon. The creek, which is intermittent, begins in the desert north of McDermitt in Malheur County. It joins Crooked Creek southeast of the intersection of U.S. Route 95 and Oregon Route 78 at Burns Junction, about 15 miles (24 km) from the larger stream's confluence with the Owyhee River.

== See also ==
- List of rivers of Oregon
- List of longest streams of Oregon
