= List of longest streams of Oregon =

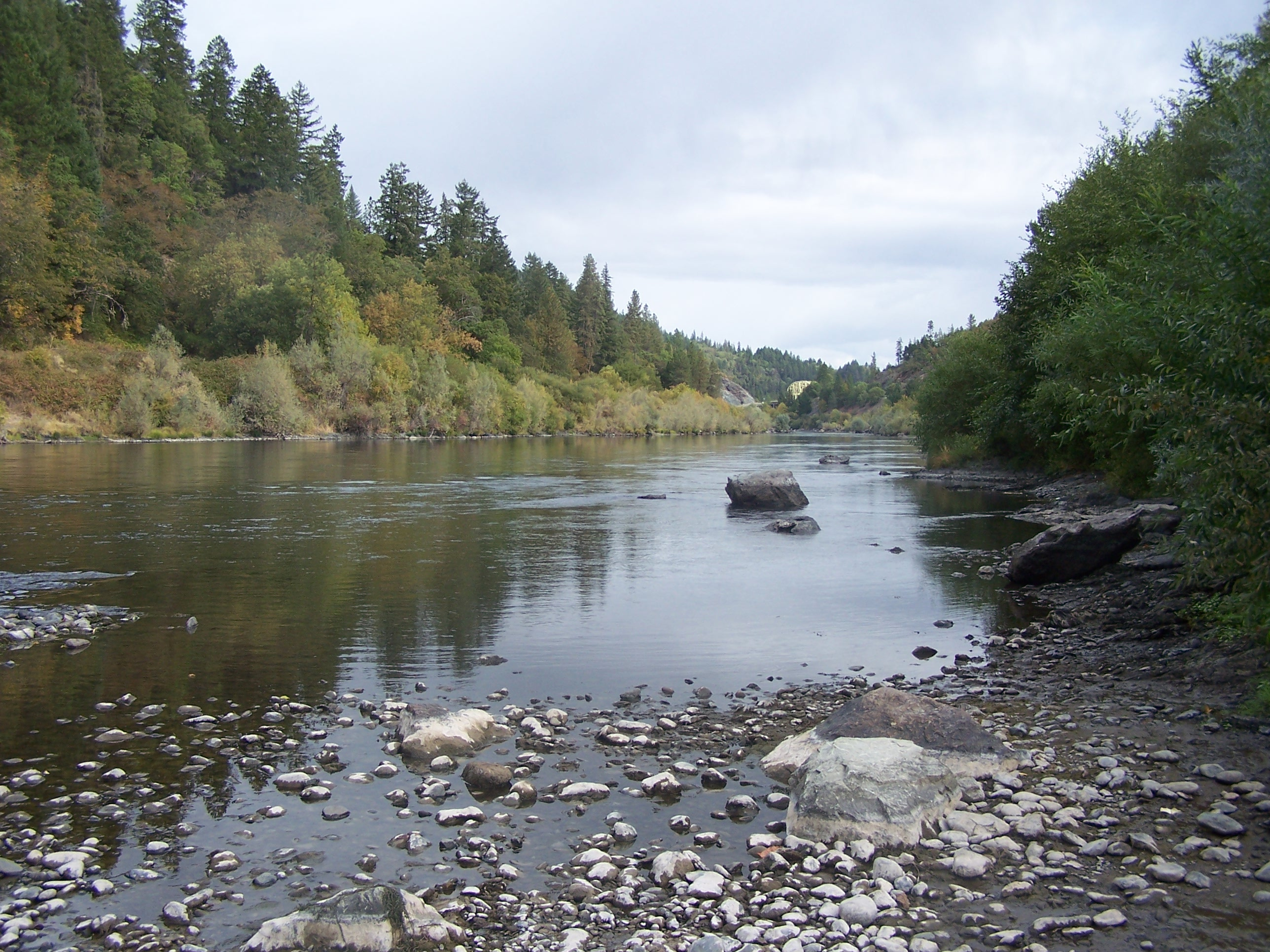
Rogue River (seventh longest) near Indian Mary Park in Josephine County

Seventy-seven rivers and creeks of at least 50 miles (80 km) in total length are the longest streams of the U.S. state of Oregon. All of these streams originate in the United States except the longest, the Columbia, which begins in the Canadian province of British Columbia and flows 1,249 miles (2,010 km) to the sea near Astoria. The second-longest, the Snake River, which at 1,078 miles (1,735 km) is the only other stream of more than 1,000 miles (1,600 km) on the list, begins in Wyoming and flows through parts of Idaho and Washington, as well as Oregon. Some of the other streams also cross borders between Oregon and California, Nevada, Idaho, or Washington, but the majority flow entirely within Oregon.

The Atlas of Oregon ranks 31 rivers in the state by average streamflow; the top five are the Columbia, Snake, Willamette, Santiam, and Umpqua. Not all Oregon rivers with high average flows are on this list of longest streams because neither their main stems nor any of their tributaries (including what are called "forks") are at least 50 miles (80 km) long. High-flow streams mentioned in the Atlas but not included in this long-stream list are the Metolius, Hood, Youngs, and Coos rivers. On the other hand, the list includes four low-flow intermittent streams—Dry River, Rattlesnake Creek, Rock Creek, and Dry Creek—that cross parts of the Oregon High Desert.

The direction of Oregon stream flow is influenced by four major drainage divides: the Oregon Coast Range on the west, the Cascade Range further inland, the Klamath–Siskiyou Mountains in the southwest, and the Blue Mountains in the northeast. One set of streams, including the Nehalem River, flows directly into the Pacific Ocean or into larger streams flowing directly to the Pacific; other streams, such as the Deschutes River, flow into the Columbia River or its tributaries. A third set, including the Klamath River and its tributaries, originates in Oregon, but its waters eventually flow into northern California before reaching the ocean. Other streams like the Donner und Blitzen River flow into closed basins, such as Malheur Lake, that have no outlet to the sea.

Source data for the table below came from topographic maps created by the United States Geological Survey and published on-line by TopoQuest, and from the Atlas of Oregon; the Oregon Atlas and Gazetteer; two federally produced geographic information system (GIS) datasets—the National Hydrography Dataset and the National Watershed Boundary Dataset—and other sources as noted. In the table, total lengths are given in miles (mi) and kilometers (km), and elevations are in feet (ft) and meters (m).

== Rivers and creeks ==
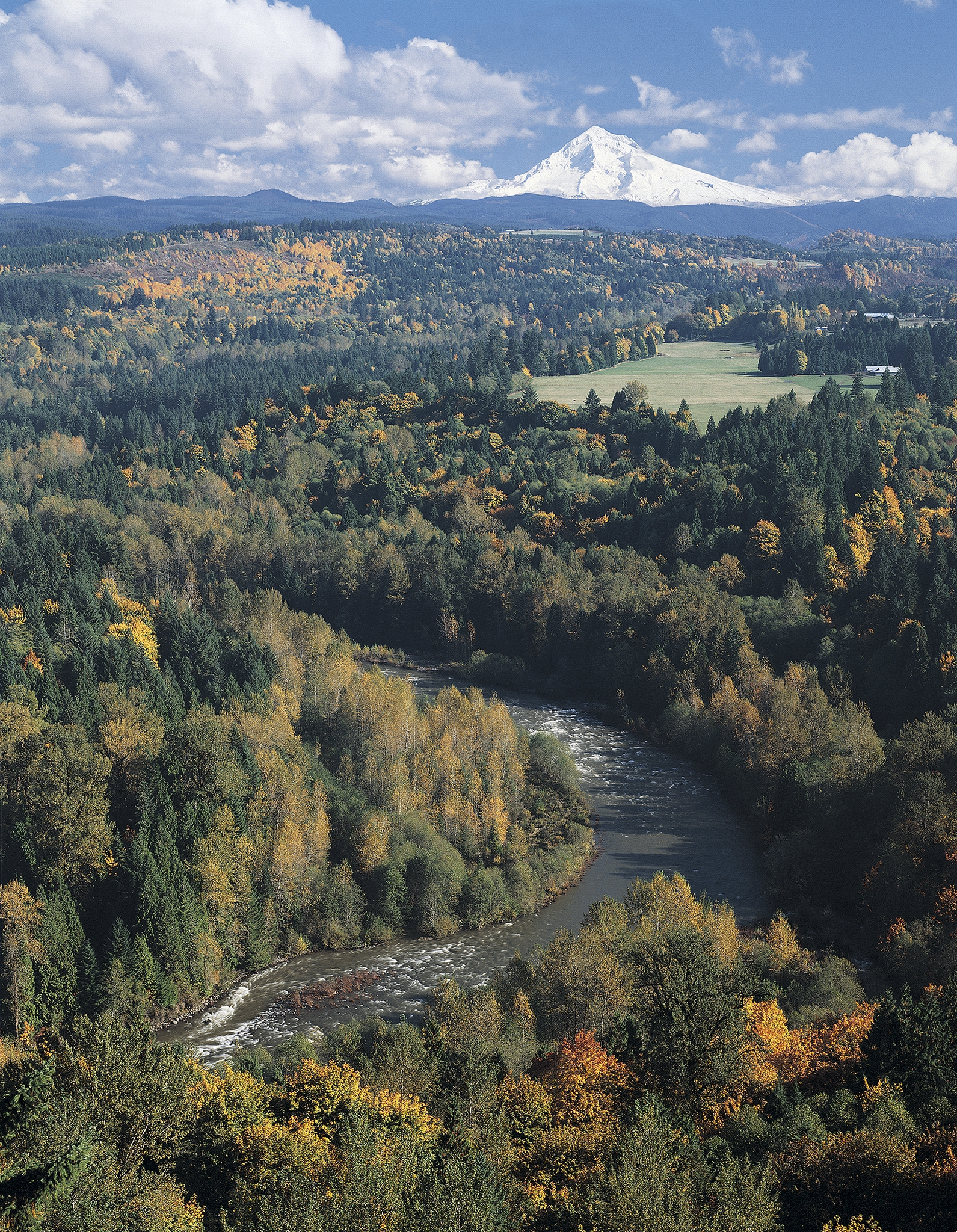
Sandy River, 63rd longest

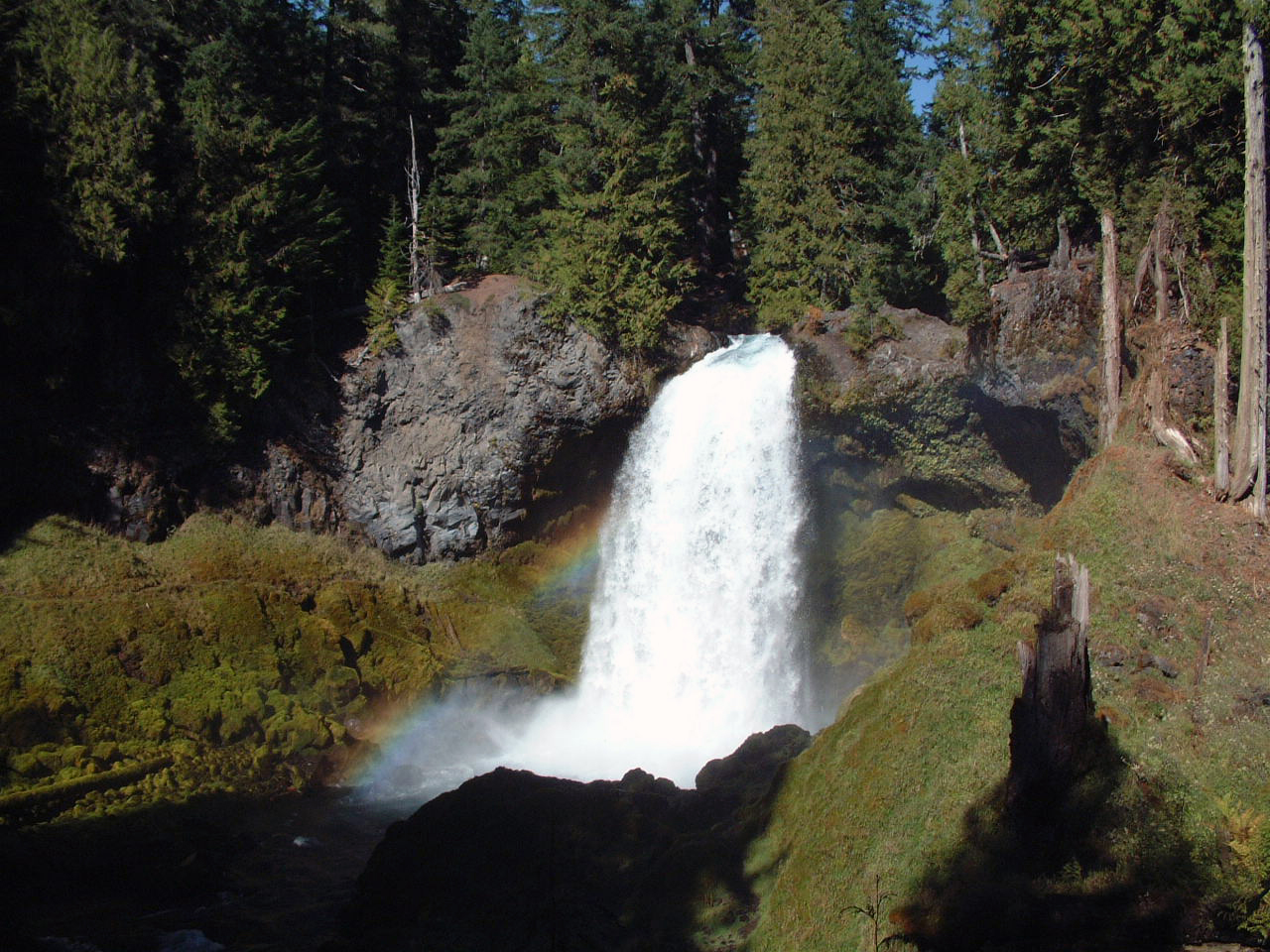
McKenzie River, 26th longest

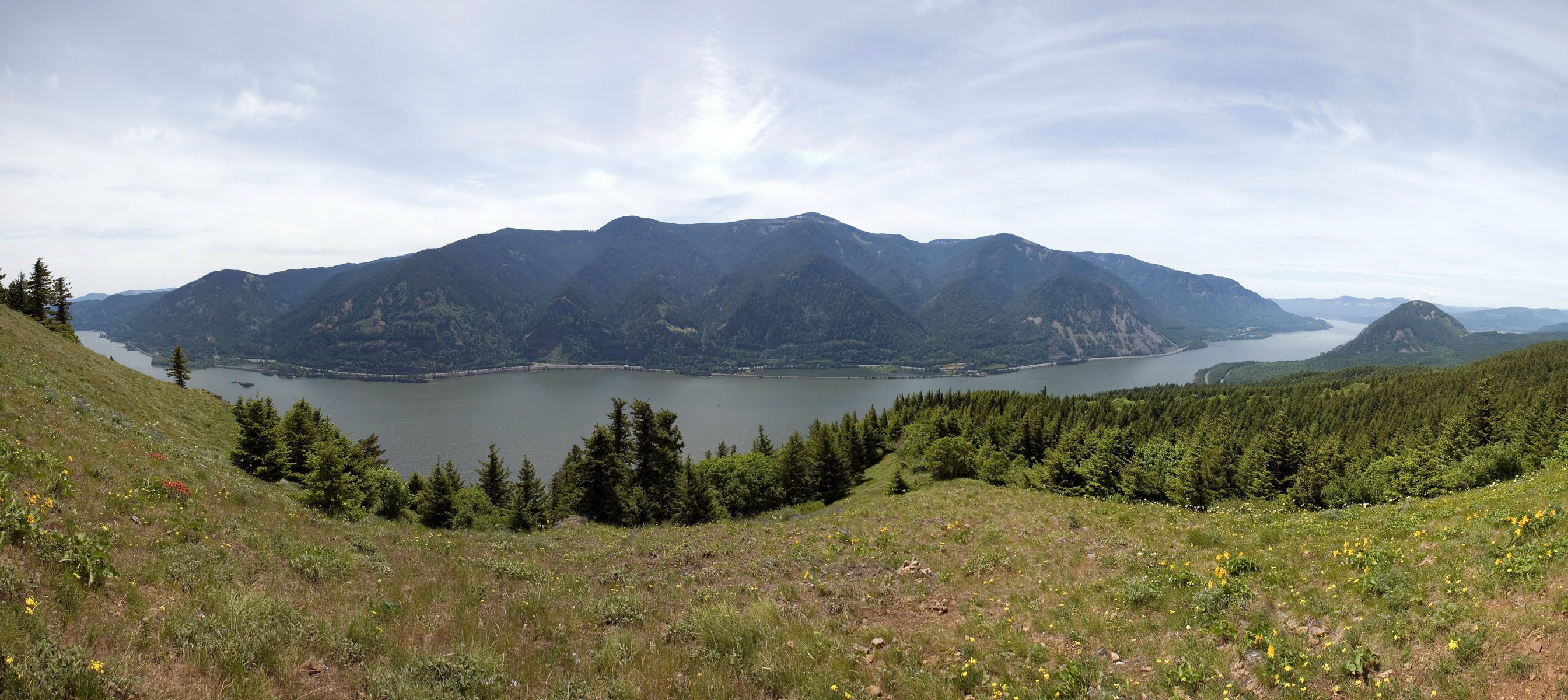
Columbia River, longest

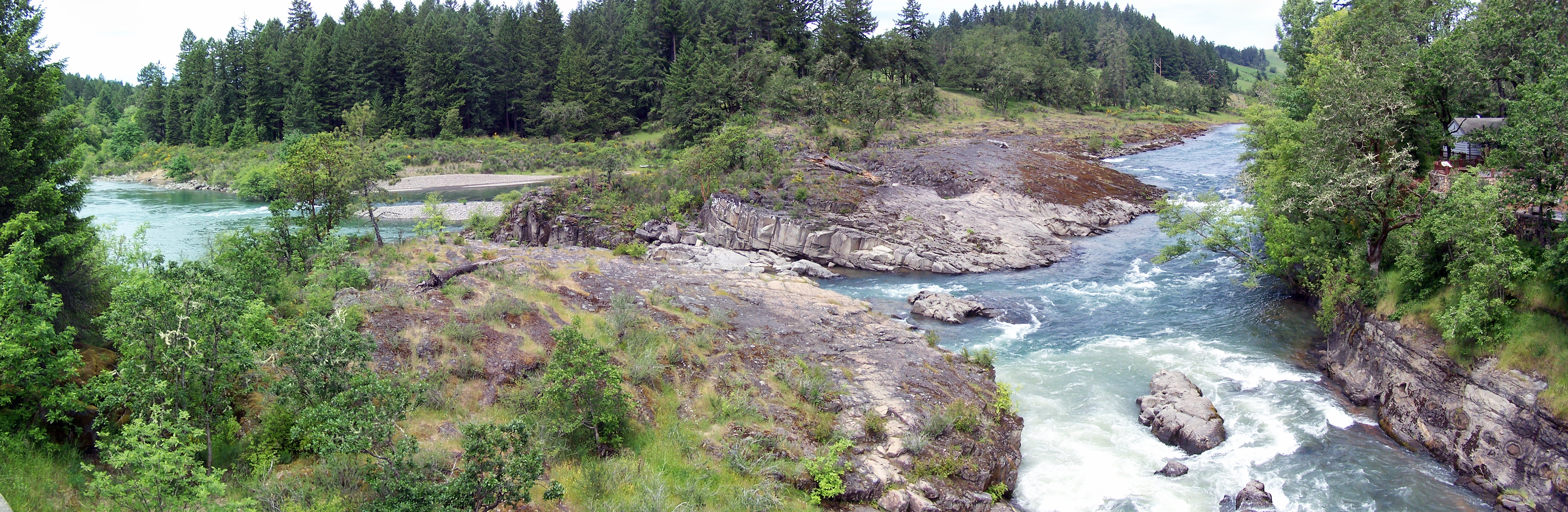
North Umpqua River, 18th longest

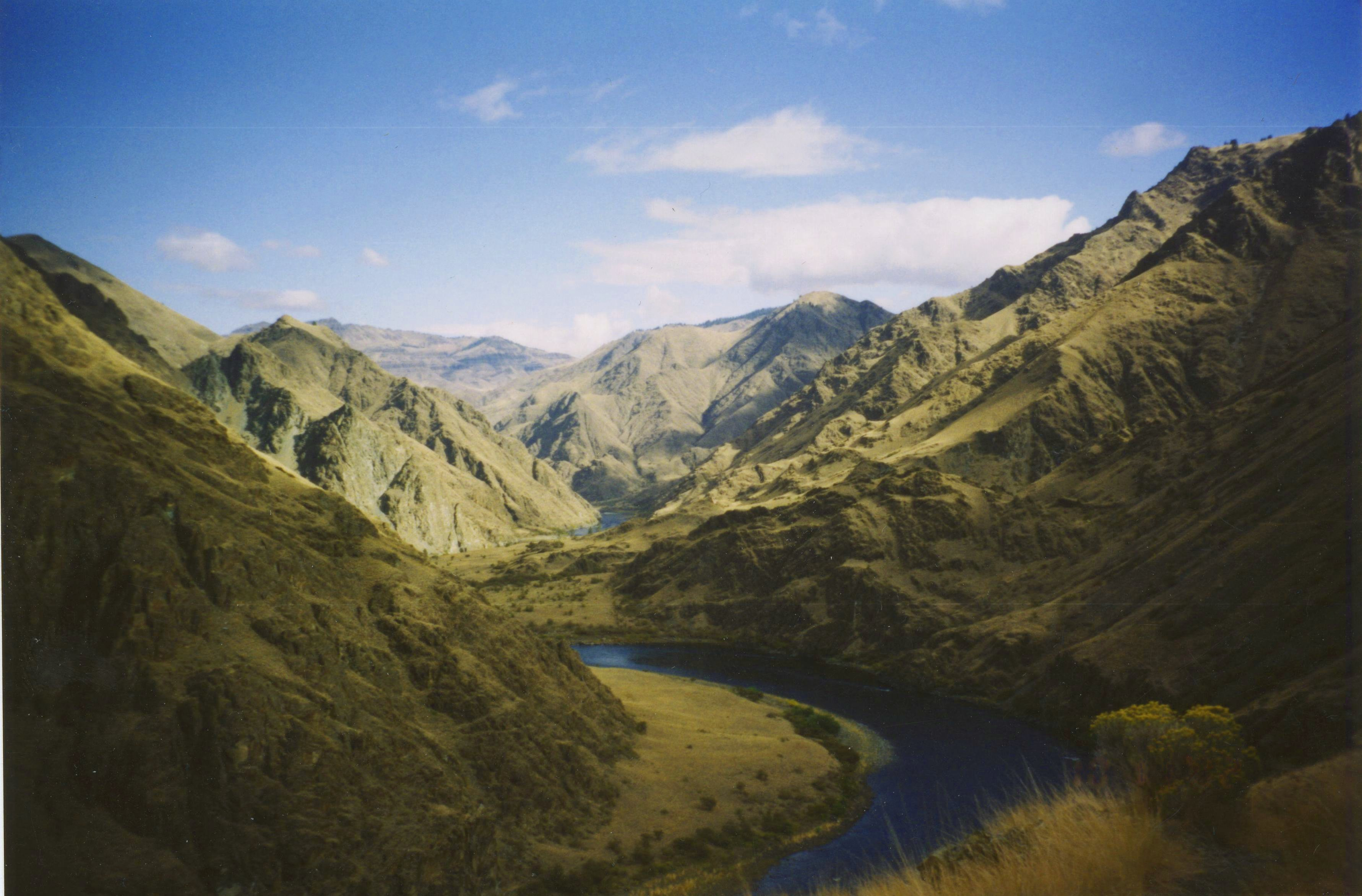
Snake River, 2nd longest

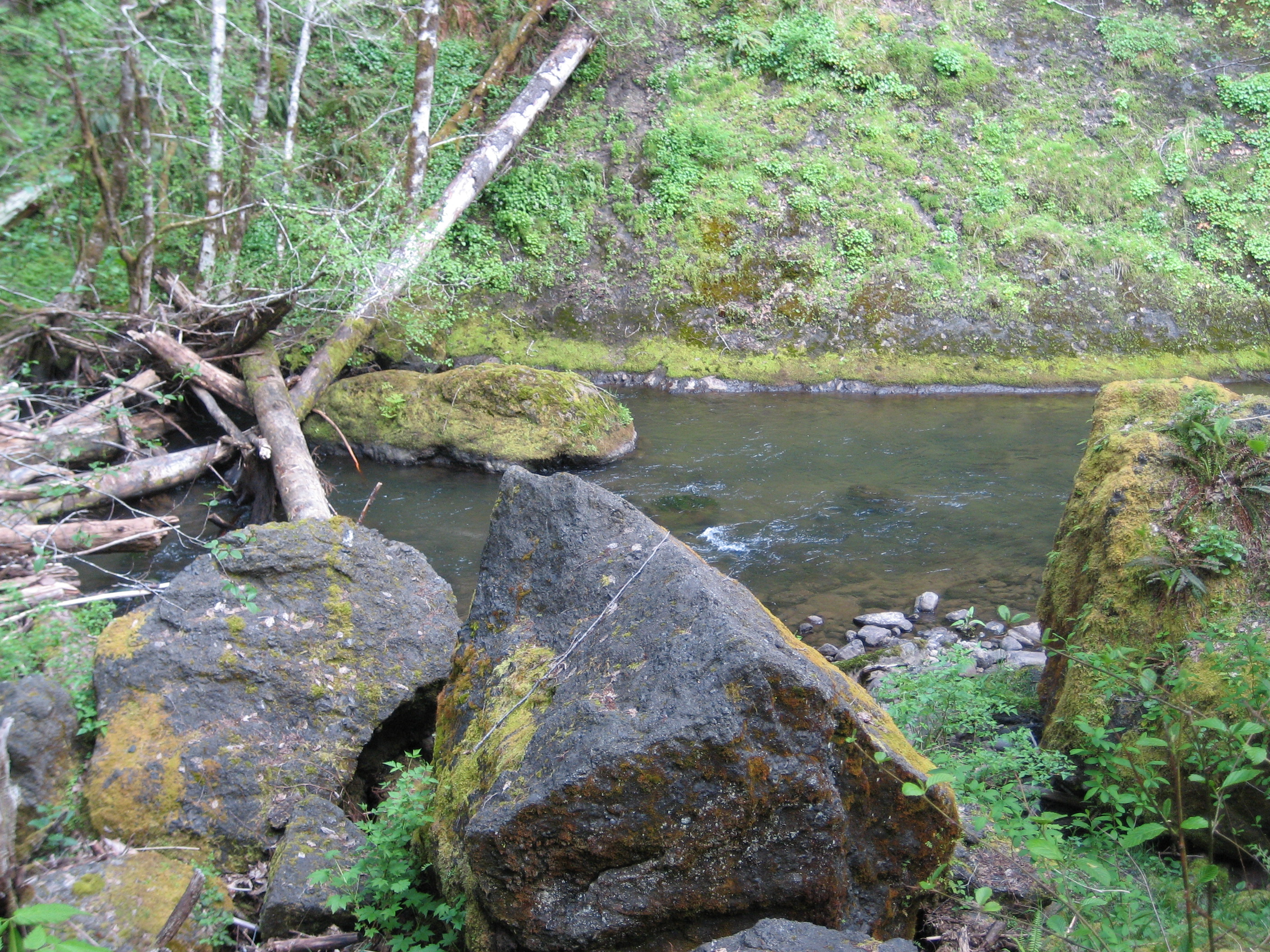
Nestucca River, 67th longest

Key
† Stream is not entirely within the state

Longest streams of Oregon
Name	Mouth	Total length	Watershed area	Mouth coordinates	Mouth elevation	Source coordinates	Source elevation	Source and mouth locations
Columbia River	Pacific Ocean	1,249 mi 2,010 km† (Note: Only 307 miles (494 km) of the Columbia River flow through Oregon.)	258,000 mi^{2} 668,000 km^{2}	46°14′39″N 124°03′29″W	0 ft 0 m	50°13′00″N 115°51′00″W	2,657 ft 810 m	Source at Columbia Lake, British Columbia, mouth near Astoria
Snake River	Columbia River	1,078 mi 1,674 km† (Note: Only 235 miles (378 km) of the Snake River flow through Oregon.)	108,000 mi^{2} 280,000 km^{2}	46°11′10″N 119°01′43″W	358 ft 109 m	44°07′49″N 110°13′10″W	9,199 ft 2,804 m	Source in Absaroka Range, Wyoming, mouth near Tri-Cities, Washington
Owyhee River	Snake River	346 mi 557 km† (Note: Only 198 miles (319 km) of the Owyhee River flow through Oregon.)	11,049 mi^{2} 28,617 km^{2}	43°48′46″N 117°01′32″W	3,185 ft 666 m	41°30′17″N 115°44′30″W	6,918 ft 2,109 m	Source in Independence Mountains of Nevada, mouth near Nyssa
Klamath River	Pacific Ocean	287 mi 462 km† (Note: Only 46 miles (74 km) of the Klamath River flow through Oregon.)	15,700 mi^{2} 40,700 km^{2}	41°32′49″N 124°05′00″W	0 ft 0 m	42°11′29″N 121°46′58″W	4,090 ft 1,247 m	Source at Upper Klamath Lake, mouth near Crescent City, California
John Day River	Columbia River	284 mi 457 km	7,880 mi^{2} 20,400 km^{2}	45°43′57″N 120°38′57″W	269 ft 82 m	44°14′44″N 118°33′08″W	6,676 ft 2,035 m	Source in Strawberry Range, mouth near Rufus
Deschutes River	Columbia River	251 mi 405 km	10,400 mi^{2} 26,939 km^{2}	45°38′07″N 120°54′52″W	164 ft 50 m	43°54′33″N 121°45′40″W	4,747 ft 1,447 m	Source in Cascade Range, mouth near Biggs Junction
Rogue River	Pacific Ocean	216 mi 348 km	5,159 mi^{2} 13,360 km^{2}	42°25′21″N 124°25′45″W	0 ft 0 m	43°03′57″N 122°13′56″W	5,320 ft 1,622 m	Source in Cascade Range, mouth near Gold Beach
Malheur River	Snake River	190 mi 306 km	4,703 mi^{2} 12,180 km^{2}	44°03′33″N 116°58′31″W	2,133 ft 650 m	44°08′05″N 118°37′14″W	4,958 ft 1,511 m	Source in Strawberry Range, mouth near Ontario
Willamette River	Columbia River	187 mi 301 km	11,400 mi^{2} 30,000 km^{2}	45°39′10″N 122°45′53″W	10 ft 3 m	44°01′23″N 123°01′25″W	438 ft 134 m	Source near Eugene, mouth near Portland
Grande Ronde River	Snake River	182 mi 293 km† (Note: Only about 144 miles (232 km) of the Grande Ronde River flow through Oregon. The river leaves Oregon and enters Washington at about river mile 39, reenters Oregon at river mile 38, and flows back into Washington at river mile 37. The distance within Oregon is the total length, 182 miles (293 km), minus the distance 38 miles (61 km) in Washington.)	4,000 mi^{2} 10,240 km^{2}	46°04′49″N 116°58′47″W	820 ft 250 m	44°57′34″N 118°15′38″W	7,446 ft 2,270 m	Source in Blue Mountains, mouth on Washington–Idaho border
Powder River	Snake River	153 mi 246 km	1,603 mi^{2} 4,150 km^{2}	44°44′37″N 117°02′56″W	2,064 ft 629 m	44°44′30″N 118°12′22″W	4,402 ft 1,342 m	Source in Blue Mountains, mouth near Richland
Crooked River	Deschutes River	125 mi 201 km	4,300 mi^{2} 11,137 km^{2}	44°34′25″N 121°16′19″W	1,949 ft 594 m	44°06′05″N 120°03′04″W	3,624 ft 1,105 m	Source near Ochoco Mountains, mouth near Culver
Middle Fork Willamette River	Willamette River	122 mi 196 km	1,355 mi^{2} 3,510 km^{2}	44°01′23″N 123°01′25″W	436 ft 133 m	43°24′28″N 122°06′20″W	5,552 ft 1,692 m	Source in Calapooya Mountains, mouth near Springfield
Nehalem River	Pacific Ocean	128 mi 206 km	852 mi^{2} 2,210 km^{2}	45°39′29″N 123°56′04″W	0 ft 0 m	45°43′53″N 123°25′26″W	2,420 ft 740 m	Source in Northern Oregon Coast Range, mouth near Wheeler
Silvies River	Malheur Lake	119 mi 192 km	1,350 mi^{2} 3,500 km^{2}	43°34′05″N 119°02′04″W	4,150 ft 1,265 m	44°07′19″N 119°13′53″W	5,649 ft 1,722 m	Source in Blue Mountains, mouth near Burns
North Fork John Day River	John Day River	117 mi 188 km	600 mi^{2} 1,554 km^{2}	44°45′22″N 119°38′19″W	1,834 ft 559 m	44°51′48″N 118°14′13″W	7,420 ft 2,260 m	Source in Elkhorn Mountains, mouth near Kimberly
Umpqua River	Pacific Ocean	112 mi 180 km	4,668 mi^{2} 12,133 km^{2}	43°40′09″N 124°12′18″W	0 ft 0 m	43°16′05″N 123°26′46″W	362 ft 110 m	Source near Roseburg, mouth near Reedsport
Siuslaw River	Pacific Ocean	110 mi 180 km	773 mi^{2} 2,000 km^{2}	44°01′01″N 124°08′14″W	0 ft 0 m	43°49′23″N 123°15′42″W	632 ft 193 m	Source in Central Oregon Coast Range, mouth at Florence
North Umpqua River	Umpqua River	110 mi 170 km	1,356 mi^{2} 3,510 km^{2}	43°16′05″N 123°26′45″W	361 ft 110 m	43°15′24″N 122°00′03″W	5,985 ft 1,824 m	Source in Cascade Range, mouth near Roseburg
South Umpqua River	Umpqua River	110 mi 170 km	1,801 mi^{2} 4,660 km^{2}	43°16′04″N 123°26′46″W	361 ft 110 m	43°06′26″N 122°35′22″W	2,009 ft 612 m	Source in Cascade Range, mouth near Roseburg
Little Deschutes River	Deschutes River	105 mi 169 km	1,020 mi^{2} 2,642 km^{2}	43°51′14″N 121°27′14″W	4,163 ft 1,269 m	43°18′25″N 121°59′43″W	6,219 ft 1,896 m	Source in Cascade Range, mouth near Sunriver
Jordan Creek	Owyhee River	99 mi 159 km† (Note: Only 52 miles (84 km) of Jordan Creek flow through Oregon. The creek enters Oregon at about river mile 52.)	1,305 mi^{2} 3,380 km^{2}	42°51′45″N 117°38′29″W	3,363 ft 1,025 m	42°58′21″N 116°44′39″W	7,551 ft 2,302 m	Source in Owyhee Mountains of Idaho, mouth near Rome
Burnt River	Snake River	98 mi 158 km	1,041 mi^{2} 2,700 km^{2}	44°21′54″N 117°13′34″W	2,073 ft 632 m	44°30′15″N 118°10′51″W	3,824 ft 1,166 m	Source in Blue Mountains, mouth near Huntington
North Santiam River	Santiam River	92 mi 148 km	766 mi^{2} 1,984 km^{2}	44°41′12″N 123°00′24″W	217 ft 66 m	44°28′39″N 121°53′04″W	5,133 ft 1,565 m	Source in Cascade Range, mouth in Willamette Valley
Smith River	Umpqua River	91 mi 146 km	352 mi^{2} 910 km^{2}	43°44′13″N 124°04′43″W	0 mi 0 km	43°44′25″N 123°20′22″W	1,406 ft 429 m	Source in Central Oregon Coast Range, mouth near Reedsport
Umatilla River	Columbia River	89 mi 143 km	2,328 mi^{2} 6,030 km^{2}	45°55′09″N 119°21′20″W	269 ft 82 m	45°43′32″N 118°11′17″W	2,332 ft 711 m	Source in Blue Mountains, mouth at Umatilla
Dry River (intermittent)	Crooked River	88 mi 142 km	752 mi^{2} 1,948 km^{2}	44°20′10″N 121°02′50″W	2,782 ft 848 m	43°46′56″N 120°16′44″W	5,886 ft 1,794 m	Source in Hampton Buttes near Brothers, mouth upstream of Smith Rock
McKenzie River	Willamette River	88 mi 142 km	1,216 mi^{2} 3,150 km^{2}	44°07′32″N 123°06′20″W	371 ft 113 m	44°21′37″N 121°59′39″W	3,570 ft 1,088 m	Source in Cascade Range, mouth near Eugene
Silver Creek	Harney Lake	87 mi 140 km	1,700 mi^{2} 4,403 km^{2}	43°15′47″N 119°11′21″W	4,101 ft 1,250 m	43°56′28″N 119°33′25″W	5,830 ft 1,777 m	Source in Malheur National Forest, mouth at Harney Lake
Sprague River	Williamson River	84 mi 135 km	1,560 mi^{2} 4,050 km^{2}	42°34′16″N 121°52′28″W	4,163 ft 1,269 m	42°26′16″N 121°06′34″W	4,326 ft 1,319 m	Source on high plateau of eastern Klamath County, mouth near Chiloquin
Clackamas River	Willamette River	83 mi 134 km	940 mi^{2} 2,435 km^{2}	45°22′21″N 122°36′31″W	10 ft 3 m	44°49′17″N 121°47′47″W	4,904 ft 1,496 m	Source in Cascade Range, mouth at Gladstone and Oregon City
Tualatin River	Willamette River	83 mi 134 km	712 mi^{2} 1,844 km^{2}	45°20′17″N 122°39′05″W	59 ft 18 m	45°28′55″N 123°24′21″W	1,978 ft 603 m	Source in Northern Oregon Coast Range, mouth near West Linn
Rock Creek	John Day River	82 mi 132 km	507 mi^{2} 1,313 km^{2}	45°34′36″N 120°24′17″W	404 ft 123 m	45°02′00″N 119°34′35″W	4,351 ft 1,326 m	Source in Umatilla National Forest, mouth east of Wasco
Willow Creek	Columbia River	79 mi 127 km	880 mi^{2} 2,279 km^{2}	45°48′21″N 120°00′24″W	269 ft 82 m	45°09′56″N 119°20′29″W	4,918 ft 1,499 m	Source in Umatilla National Forest, mouth upstream of Arlington
Donner und Blitzen River	Malheur Lake	78 mi 126 km	618 mi^{2} 1,600 km^{2}	43°17′30″N 118°49′12″W	4,101 ft 1,250 m	42°32′02″N 118°43′52″W	6,526 ft 1989 m	Source near Steens Mountain, mouth at Malheur Lake
South Fork Crooked River	Crooked River	76 mi 123 km	1,530 mi^{2} 4,000 km^{2}	44°06′05″N 120°03′04″W	3,622 ft 1,104 m	43°38′55″N 120°23′40″W	4,779 ft 1,457 m	Source southeast of Brothers, mouth near Ochoco Mountains
Middle Fork John Day River	North Fork John Day River	75 mi 121 km	321 mi^{2} 833 km^{2}	44°54′59″N 119°18′08″W	2,198 ft 670 m	44°35′05″N 118°25′48″W	4,253 ft 1,296 m	Source in Blue Mountains, mouth near Monument
Cow Creek	South Umpqua River	75 mi 121 km	456 mi^{2} 1,181 km^{2}	42°56′49″N 123°20′16″W	636 ft 194 m	42°48′09″N 122°59′30″W	2,404 ft 733 m	Source in Umpqua National Forest, mouth at Canyonville
Sycan River	Sprague River	75 mi 121 km	557 mi^{2} 1,440 km^{2}	42°27′40″N 121°17′13″W	4,311 ft 1,314 m	42°38′50″N 120°44′08″W	7,075 ft 2,156 m	Source on high plateau of eastern Klamath County, mouth at Beatty
Imnaha River	Snake River	73 mi 117 km	851 mi^{2} 2,2004 km^{2}	45°49′03″N 116°45′53″W	945 ft 288 m	45°06′47″N 117°07′31″W	6,641 ft 2,024 m	Source in Wallowa Mountains, mouth on Idaho border
Calapooia River	Willamette River	72 mi 116 km	365 mi^{2} 945 km^{2}	44°38′20″N 123°06′36″W	180 ft 55 m	44°15′54″N 122°19′25″W	4,552 ft 1,387 m	Source in Cascade Range, mouth at Albany
Williamson River	Klamath River	70 mi 110 km	3,000 mi^{2} 7,800 km^{2}	42°27′53″N 121°57′25″W	4,147 ft 1,264 m	42°42′15″N 121°20′24″W	5,100 ft 1,600 m	Source on high plateau of eastern Klamath County, mouth at Upper Klamath Lake
Siletz River	Pacific Ocean	69 mi 111 km	304 mi^{2} 790 km^{2}	44°54′12″N 124°00′41″W	0 ft 0 m	44°52′48″N 123°42′40″W	708 ft 216 m	Source in Central Oregon Coast Range, mouth near Lincoln City
Succor Creek	Snake River	67 mi 108 km† (Note: Only 39 miles (63 km) of Succor Creek flow through Oregon. The creek enters Oregon at about river mile 44 and leaves it at about river mile 5.)	494 mi^{2} 1,279 km^{2}	43°37′55″N 116°56′47″W	2,211 ft 674 m	43°05′45″N 116°50′18″W	6,976 ft 2,126 m	Source in Owyhee Mountains, mouth near Homedale, both in Idaho
South Santiam River	Santiam River	66 mi 106 km	1,040 mi^{2} 2,694 km^{2}	44°41′12″N 123°00′24″W	217 ft 66 m	44°22′27″N 122°13′05″W	1,932 ft 589 m	Source in Cascade Range, mouth in Willamette Valley
Pudding River	Molalla River	64 mi 103 km	527 mi^{2} 1,360 km^{2}	45°17′54″N 122°43′07″W	69 ft 21 m	44°53′51″N 122°44′42″W	950 ft 290 m	Source in Waldo Hills, mouth near Canby
South Fork Coquille River	Coquille River	63 mi 101 km	288 mi^{2} 746 km^{2}	43°04′49″N 124°08′29″W	13 ft 4 m	42°50′24″N 123°52′30″W	3,472 ft 1,058 m	Source in Siskiyou National Forest, mouth near Myrtle Point
West Little Owyhee River	Owyhee River	63 mi 101 km	310 mi^{2} 803 km^{2}	42°27′10″N 117°12′34″W	4,373 ft 1,333 m	42°06′30″N 117°35′03″W	6,508 ft 1,984 m	Source near McDermitt, mouth in Owyhee Desert
Bully Creek	Malheur River	62 mi 99 km	540 mi^{2} 1,560 km^{2}	43°58′30″N 117°14′24″W	2,244 ft 684 m	44°05′25″N 118°05′55″W	4,278 ft 1,304 m	Source in Malheur County, mouth near Vale
Luckiamute River	Willamette River	61 mi 98 km	315 mi^{2} 816 km^{2}	44°45′15″N 123°08′54″W	164 ft 50 m	44°47′28″N 123°32′45″W	2,684 ft 818 m	Source in Central Oregon Coast Range, mouth near Buena Vista
South Fork John Day River	John Day River	60 mi 97 km	607 mi^{2} 1,570 km^{2}	44°28′26″N 119°32′10″W	2,329 ft 710 m	43°55′09″N 119°19′17″W	5,400 ft 1,600 m	Source in Ochoco Mountains, mouth near Dayville
Lost River	Tule Lake	60 mi 97 km† (Note: Only about 46 miles (74 km) of the Lost River flow through Oregon. The river enters Oregon at about river mile 48 and leaves it at about river mile 2.)	2,998 mi^{2} 7,760 km^{2}	41°56′24″N 121°30′19″W	4,035 ft 1,230 m	41°55′34″N 121°04′33″W	4,479 ft 1,365 m	Source at Clear Lake Reservoir, mouth at Tule Lake, both in California
South Yamhill River	Yamhill River	60 mi 97 km	492 mi^{2} 1,274 km^{2}	45°13′33″N 123°08′41″W	75 ft 23 m	45°06′38″N 123°43′40″W	551 ft 168 m	Source in Northern Oregon Coast Range, mouth near McMinnville
North Fork Malheur River	Malheur River	59 mi 95 km	550 mi^{2} 1,424 km^{2}	43°45′25″N 118°03′40″W	2,923 ft 891 m	44°21′58″N 118°24′16″W	6,884 ft 2,098 m	Source in Strawberry Range, mouth near Juntura
Yaquina River	Pacific Ocean	59 mi 95 km	253 mi^{2} 660 km^{2}	44°36′44″N 124°01′04″W	0 ft 0 m	44°44′57″N 123°36′06″W	2,137 ft 651 m	Source in Central Oregon Coast Range, mouth at Newport
Butter Creek	Umatilla River	57 mi 92 km	465 mi^{2} 1,204 km^{2}	45°47′41″N 119°19′44″W	535 ft 163 m	45°12′24″N 119°10′25″W	5,034 ft 1,534 m	Source in Umatilla National Forest, mouth upstream of Hermiston
Rattlesnake Creek (intermittent)	Crooked Creek	57 mi 92 km	298 mi^{2} 772 km^{2}	42°43′24″N 117°47′42″W	3,770 ft 1,149 m	42°16′55″N 117°40′10″W	6,439 ft 1,963 m	Source in desert north of McDermitt, mouth near Burns Junction
Willow Creek	Malheur River	57 mi 92 km	787 mi^{2} 2,038 km^{2}	43°59′14″N 117°13′51″W	2,234 ft 681 m	44°20′08″N 117°56′15″W	3,724 ft 1,135 m	Source near Ironside, mouth near Vale
Chetco River	Pacific Ocean	56 mi 90 km	352 mi^{2} 912 km^{2}	42°02′43″N 124°16′14″W	0 ft 0 m	42°07′47″N 123°52′39″W	3,201 ft 976 m	Source in Klamath Mountains, mouth near Brookings
Illinois River	Rogue River	56 mi 97 km	990 mi^{2} 2,600 km^{2}	42°33′00″N 124°03′58″W	102 ft 31 m	42°09′35″N 123°39′33″W	1,275 ft 389 m	Source near Cave Junction (between Klamath Mountains and Siskiyou Mountains), mouth near Agness
Rock Creek (intermittent)	Catlow Valley	56 mi 90 km	269 mi^{2} 697 km^{2}	42°39′41″N 119°10′08″W	4,557 ft 1,389 m	42°26′57″N 119°41′33″W	6,896 ft 2,102 m	Source on Hart Mountain, mouth in Catlow Valley
Wallowa River	Grande Ronde River	56 mi 90 km	927 mi^{2} 2,400 km^{2}	45°43′31″N 117°47′09″W	2,316 ft 706 m	45°16′28″N 117°12′42″W	4,498 ft 1,371 m	Source in Wallowa Mountains, mouth downstream of Wallowa
Sandy River	Columbia River	55 mi 89 km	508 mi^{2} 1,316 km^{2}	45°34′05″N 122°24′03″W	10 ft 3 m	45°22′32″N 121°43′45″W	5,225 ft 1,593 m	Source in Cascade Range, mouth near Troutdale
Long Tom River	Willamette River	55 mi 89 km	410 mi^{2} 1,062 km^{2}	44°22′48″N 123°14′54″W	256 ft 78 m	44°13′12″N 123°26′39″W	1,400 ft 427 m	Source near Low Pass, mouth north of Monroe
Fifteenmile Creek	Columbia River	54 mi 87 km	370 mi^{2} 960 km^{2}	45°36′50″N 121°07′22″W	95 ft 29 m	45°20′35″N 121°31′18″W	6,178 ft 1,883 m	Source in Mount Hood National Forest, mouth near The Dalles
Dry Creek (intermittent)	Crooked Creek	54 mi 86 km	499 mi^{2} 1,184 km^{2}	42°47′42″N 117°44′47″W	3,570 ft 1,088 m	42°30′31″N 117°17′44″W	5,000 ft 1,524 m	Source near Five Points, mouth near Burns Junction
Nestucca River	Pacific Ocean	53 mi 85 km	370 mi^{2} 960 km^{2}	45°11′03″N 123°57′26″W	0 ft 0 m	45°16′23″N 123°23′33″W	2,246 ft 685 m	Source in Northern Oregon Coast Range, mouth near Pacific City
Warm Springs River	Deschutes River	53 mi 85 km	541 mi^{2} 1,401 km^{2}	44°51′28″N 121°04′09″W	1,240 ft 378 m	44°57′39″N 121°47′21″W	4,023 ft 1,226 m	Source in Cascade Range, mouth near Kahneeta
North Fork Coquille River	Coquille River	53 mi 85 km	154 mi^{2} 399 km^{2}	43°04′49″N 124°08′29″W	13 ft 4 m	43°16′54″N 123°51′14″W	1,647 ft 502 m	Source in central Coast Range, mouth near Myrtle Point
Chewaucan River	Abert Lake	53 mi 86 km	651 mi^{2} 1,686 km^{2}	42°31′21″N 120°14′59″W	4,258 ft 1,298 m	42°27′49″N 120°36′38″W	5,151 ft 1,570 m	Source in Fremont National Forest, mouth at Abert Lake
Applegate River	Rogue River	51 mi 82 km† (Note: About 50 miles (80 km) of the Applegate River flow through Oregon. This is the sum of the 46 miles (74 km) marked on topo maps plus the remaining distance to the California border, measured by map scale and ruler.)	767 mi^{2} 1,990 km^{2}	42°25′44″N 123°26′59″W	850 ft 259 m	41°58′23″N 123°11′08″W	2,534 ft 772 m	Source in Siskiyou Mountains in California, mouth near Grants Pass
Trout Creek	Deschutes River	51 mi 82 km	692 mi^{2} 1,792 km^{2}	44°49′17″N 121°05′19″W	1,283 ft 391 m	44°30′42″N 120°33′20″W	5,593 ft 1,705 m	Source in Ochoco Mountains, mouth at Jefferson–Wasco county line
Cow Creek	Jordan Creek	51 mi 82 km† (Note: Only 36 miles (58 km) of Cow Creek flow through Oregon. The creek enters Oregon at about river mile 36.)	330 mi^{2} 855 km^{2}	42°56′51″N 117°20′38″W	4,216 ft 1,285 m	43°04′23″N 116°50′23″W	7,048 ft 2,148 m	Source near De Lamar, Idaho, mouth at Danner
Crooked Creek	Owyhee River	51 mi 82 km	1,340 mi^{2} 3,500 km^{2}	42°52′57″N 117°41′52″W	3,343 ft 1,019 m	42°40′32″N 117°54′33″W	3,921 ft 1,195 m	Source at Crooked Creek Spring, mouth near Rome
Minam River	Wallowa River	51 mi 82 km	239 mi^{2} 618 km^{2}	45°37′17″N 117°43′14″W	2,536 ft 773 m	45°10′07″N 117°21′28″W	7,684 ft 2,342 m	Source in the Eagle Cap Wilderness, mouth at Minam
Molalla River	Willamette River	50 mi 80 km	877 mi^{2} 2,270 km^{2}	45°17′23″N 122°43′18″W	69 ft 21 m	44°54′12″N 122°16′01″W	3,304 ft 1,007 m	Source in Cascade Range, mouth near Canby
Walla Walla River	Columbia River	50 mi 80 km† (Note: Only about 10 miles (16 km) of the Walla Walla River flow through Oregon. The river leaves the state and enters Washington at about river mile 40.)	1,758 mi^{2} 4,453 km^{2}	46°03′27″N 118°54′40″W	404 ft 123 m	45°53′54″N 118°18′28″W	1,360 ft 410 m	Source near Milton-Freewater, mouth near Wallula, Washington

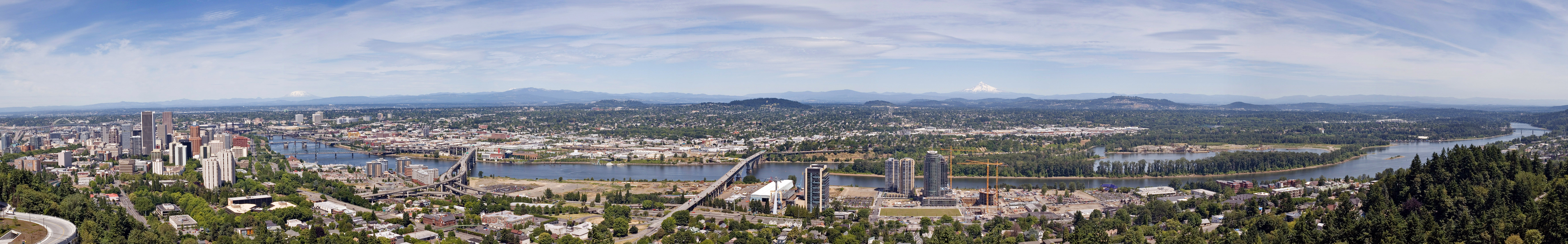
The Willamette River (10th longest) runs through the center of Portland, Oregon.

== Map ==
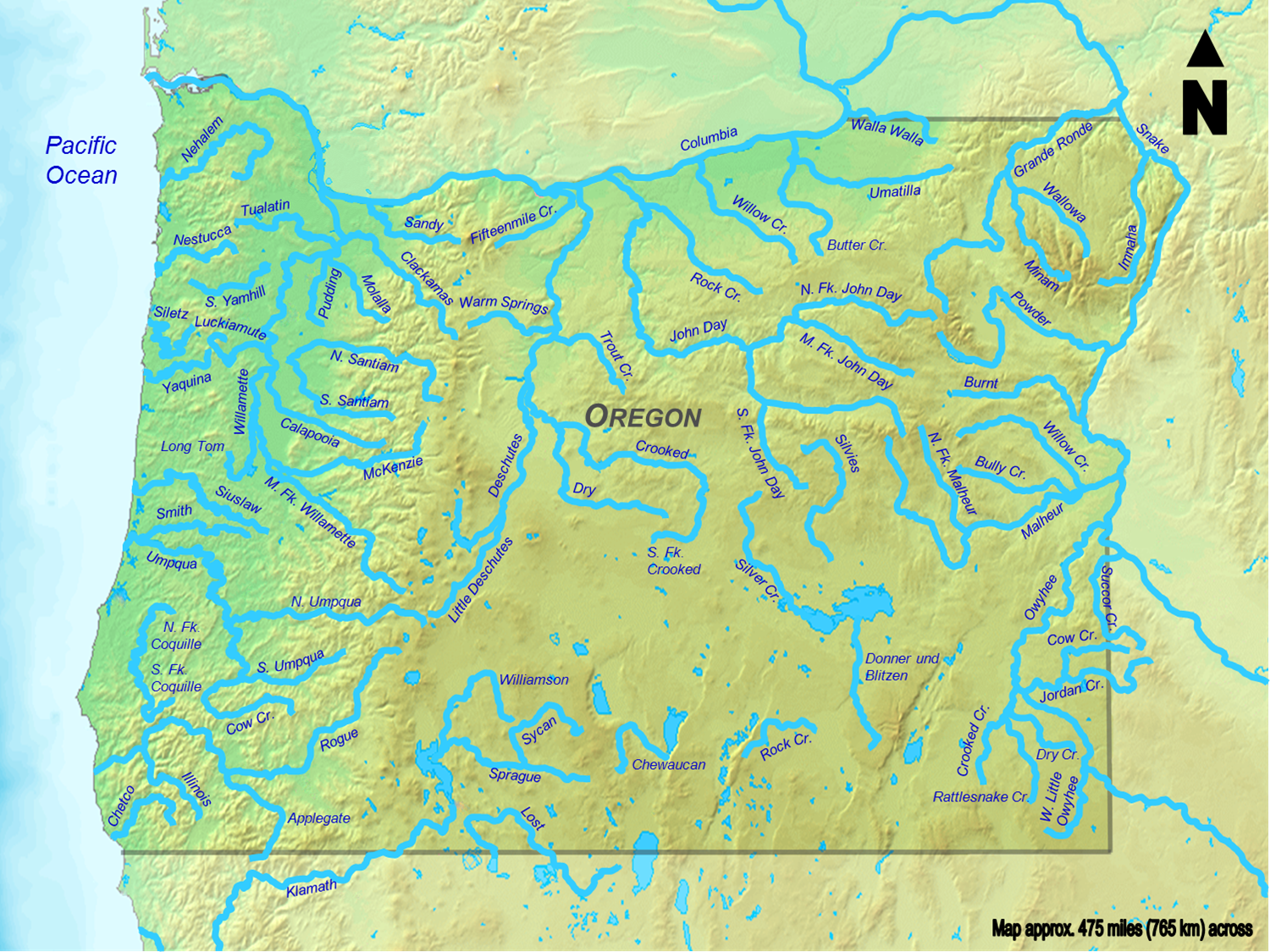
Image map of all Oregon streams more than 50 miles (80 kilometers) long. Each label is wikilinked to an article. Click on the small rectangles to the right of the caption for a larger map.

== See also ==
- List of rivers of Oregon
- List of longest rivers in the United States by state

== Notes and references ==
Notes

== Works cited ==
- Allan, Stuart; Buckley, Aileen R.; Meacham, James E. (2001) [1976]. Loy, William G. (ed.). Atlas of Oregon (2 ed.). Eugene, Oregon: University of Oregon Press. ISBN 978-0-87114-101-9.
- Carter, James L.; Resh, Vincent H. (2005a). "Chapter 12: Pacific Coast Rivers of the Coterminous United States". In Benke, Arthur C.; Cushing, Colbert E. (eds.). Rivers of North America. Burlington, Massachusetts: Elsevier Academic Press. ISBN 978-0-12-088253-3.
- Palmer, Tim (2014). Field Guide to Oregon Rivers. Corvallis, Oregon: Oregon State University Press. ISBN 978-0-87071-627-0.
- Sheehan, Madelynne Diness (2005). Fishing in Oregon: The Complete Oregon Fishing Guide (10th ed.). Scappoose, Oregon: Flying Pencil Publications. ISBN 978-0-916473-15-0.
- Stanford, Jack A.; Gregory, Stanley V.; Hauer, F. Richard; Snyder, Eric B. (2005b). "Chapter 13: Columbia River Basin". In Benke, Arthur C.; Cushing, Colbert E. (eds.). Rivers of North America. Burlington, Massachusetts: Elsevier Academic Press. ISBN 978-0-12-088253-3.
