= Dry Creek School =

Dry Creek School may refer to:

in the United States

- Dry Creek School (Manhattan, Montana), listed on the NRHP in Montana
- Dry Creek School (Summerville, Oregon), listed on the NRHP in Union County, Oregon
