= Duncans Branch =

Stream in Tennessee, U.S.

Coordinates: 35.2105°N 87.9908°W

Duncans Branch is a stream in Hardin County, Tennessee. It is a tributary to Dry Creek.

A variant name was "Duncans Creek". Duncans Branch has the name of a pioneer settler.
