= Rancid Eddie =

Australian indie rock band

- Origin: Mount Waverley, Victoria, Australia
- Genres: Indie rock; indie pop; alternative rock; rock; roots; punk; pub rock; surf rock; funk
- Years active: 2018–present
- Label: Independent
- Members: Jessy Kelly; Matt Sturrock; Eddie O'Brien; Ash Ravlic; Andy Sturrock
- Website: www.rancideddie.com

Rancid Eddie is an Australian indie rock band from Mount Waverley, Victoria. Their line-up consists of Jessy Kelly (guitar, lead vocals), Matt Sturrock (guitar, lead vocals), Eddie O'Brien (keys), Ash Ravlic (bass guitar), and Andy Sturrock (drums). Their music combines elements of indie rock, indie pop, alternative rock, rock, roots, punk, pub rock, surf rock and funk.

Rancid Eddie rose to prominence in 2021, after gaining traction on TikTok with an acoustic version of their song "Dry" prior to its official release. "Dry" became their debut chart appearance, peaking at number 17 on the ARIA Singles Chart, number 4 on the New Zealand Singles Chart, and number 64 on the Irish Singles Chart.

In October 2021, the band garnered controversy after various instances of alleged misogynistic behaviour and lyrics, which led to the cancellation of various live performances.

== Career ==
=== 2018–2020: Formation and "Club Pleasure" ===
Rancid Eddie was formed in Mount Waverley, Victoria, in 2018 by members Jessy Kelly (guitar, lead vocals), Matt Sturrock (guitar, lead vocals), Eddie O'Brien (keys), Ash Ravlic (bass guitar), and Andy (drums). On 30 November 2018, they released their debut single "Club Pleasure". On 30 August 2019, they released the single "Here We Go Again". "Here We Go Again" was co-produced by former Portugal. The Man member Noah Gersh and 30 Seconds to Mars producer Jamie Reed. On 6 September, Australian music journalism website Life Without Andy exclusively premiered the music video for the track. Alongside the premiere, they announced the forthcoming release of an EP titled One Last Dart.

=== 2021–present: "Dry" ===
On 14 May, they performed at Leadbeater Hotel in Richmond, Victoria. On 21 July, they released the single "Champagne". Throughout August and September 2021, an acoustic version of their unreleased single "Dry" gained traction on TikTok after the band used it in one of their videos. On 26 September, "Dry" was premiered on Triple J's "2021" program with Richard Kingsmill, before being released later that day. On 30 March 2022, they released the single "Chai Latte".

== Band members ==
- Jessy Kelly – guitar, lead vocals (2018–present)
- Matt Sturrock – guitarist, vocals (2018–present)
- Eddie O'Brien – keys (2018–present)
- Ash Ravlic – bass guitar (2018–present)
- Andy Sturrock – drums (2018–present)

== Musical style and influences ==
Musically, Rancid Eddie are an indie rock, indie pop, alternative, rock, roots, punk, pub rock, surf rock, and funk band, who have received comparisons to the Strokes, Sticky Fingers and the Chats.

== Controversy and misogyny allegations ==
On 2 October 2021, Australian musicians Kira Puru and Montaigne posted a series of tweets publicly criticising Rancid Eddie, alleging "problematic" and misogynyistic behaviour. Puru criticised the lyrics to their song "Dry", describing the song's lyrics as potentially "triggering" for those who have personally experienced domestic violence. Puru additionally alleged that she had received messages from women who had had "experiences" with the band, listing several of them in detail. Montaigne chastised Australian youth broadcaster Triple J for playing the band's music. In response to the allegations, Interstellar Music cancelled the band's upcoming show at their venue Thirsty Chiefs Brewing Company in North Lakes, Brisbane, which had been scheduled for 18 February 2022. The band responded to the allegations in a statement on social media, saying: "We support female artists and detest sexism in the industry. Every female artist and fan will be safe and welcome at our gigs. We are against misogyny and bigotry of every kind." The band also stated, "they were in the process of pursuing "full legal remedies" to "a completely false 'anonymous' assault allegation that is being spread around".

== Discography ==
=== Singles ===
List of singles, with year released and album name shown
Title	Year	Peak chart positions			Album
Title	Year	AUS	IRE	NZ	Album
"Club Pleasure"	2018	—	—	—	Non-album singles
"Here We Go Again"	2019	—	—	—	Non-album singles
"Champagne"	2021	—	—	—	Non-album singles
"Dry"	2021	17	64	4	Non-album singles
"Chai Latte"	2022	—	—	—	Non-album singles
