= Dry Creek (Oregon) =

Dry Creek is a common name for streams in Oregon. The Geographic Names Information System list 96 streams by that name. The National Hydrography Dataset contains 91 of those streams. Nine of them are over 15 miles in length, they are listed below.

Name	Mouth	Total length	Mouth coordinates	Source coordinates	GNIS ID	County
Dry Creek	Crooked Creek	54 miles (87 km)			1120133	Malheur
Dry Creek	Owyhee River	44 miles (71 km)			1120135	Malheur
Dry Creek	Pine Creek	23 miles (37 km)			1141312	Umatilla
Dry Creek	Jordan Creek	20 miles (32 km)			1141298	Malheur
Dry Creek	Goose Lake	18 miles (29 km)			1141293	Lake
Dry Creek	Fifteenmile Creek	17 miles (27 km)			1120126	Wasco
Dry Creek	Fort Rock Valley	17 miles (27 km)			1141299	Lake, Klamath
Dry Creek	Catlow Valley	16 miles (26 km)			1120131	Harney
Dry Creek	Willow Creek	15 miles (24 km)			1141311	Union
