= Dry Creek (Crooked Creek tributary) =

- Location of the mouth of Dry Creek in Oregon

Location
- Country: United States
- State: Oregon
- County: Malheur

Physical characteristics
- Source
  - location: near Five Points
  - coordinates: 42°30′31″N 117°17′44″W
  - elevation: 5,000 ft (1,500 m)
- Mouth: Crooked Creek
  - location: near Burns Junction
  - coordinates: 42°47′42″N 117°44′47″W
  - elevation: 3,570 ft (1,090 m)
- Length: 54 mi (87 km)
- Basin size: 299 sq mi (770 km^{2})

Dry Creek is a tributary, 54 miles (87 km) long, of Crooked Creek in the U.S. state of Oregon. The creek, which is intermittent, begins in the desert near Five Points in Malheur County. It joins Crooked Creek east of Burns Junction and about 7 miles (11 km) south of the larger stream's confluence with the Owyhee River. Dry Creek drains a basin of about 299 square miles (770 km^{2}).

Forming northeast of Five Points, Dry Creek flows north, then west, across Squaw Flat in southern Malheur County near the border with the U.S. state of Nevada. Near Garlow Butte, Coyote Creek enters from the left, and near Caviatta Ridge, Peacock Creek enters from the left. West of Caviatta Ridge, the creek turns north and receives Corbin Creek from the right. Dry Creek flows through Blevins Reservoir and then Rockhouse Reservoir before turning west again and receiving Indian Fort Creek from the right. Turning north, it joins Crooked Creek just south of U.S. Route 95 about halfway between Burns Junction and Rome.

Coyote Creek, which has an undefined basin, is about 6 miles (10 km) long. Peacock Creek is about 11 miles (18 km) long and drains a basin of about 41 square miles (110 km^{2}). Corbin Creek is about 15 miles (24 km) long; its basin covers roughly 38 square miles (98 km^{2}). Indian Fort Creek, which flows through Scott Reservoir, is about 24 miles (39 km) long, and it drains a watershed of about 47 square miles (120 km^{2}).

== See also ==
- List of rivers of Oregon
- List of longest streams of Oregon
