= Susquehecka Creek =

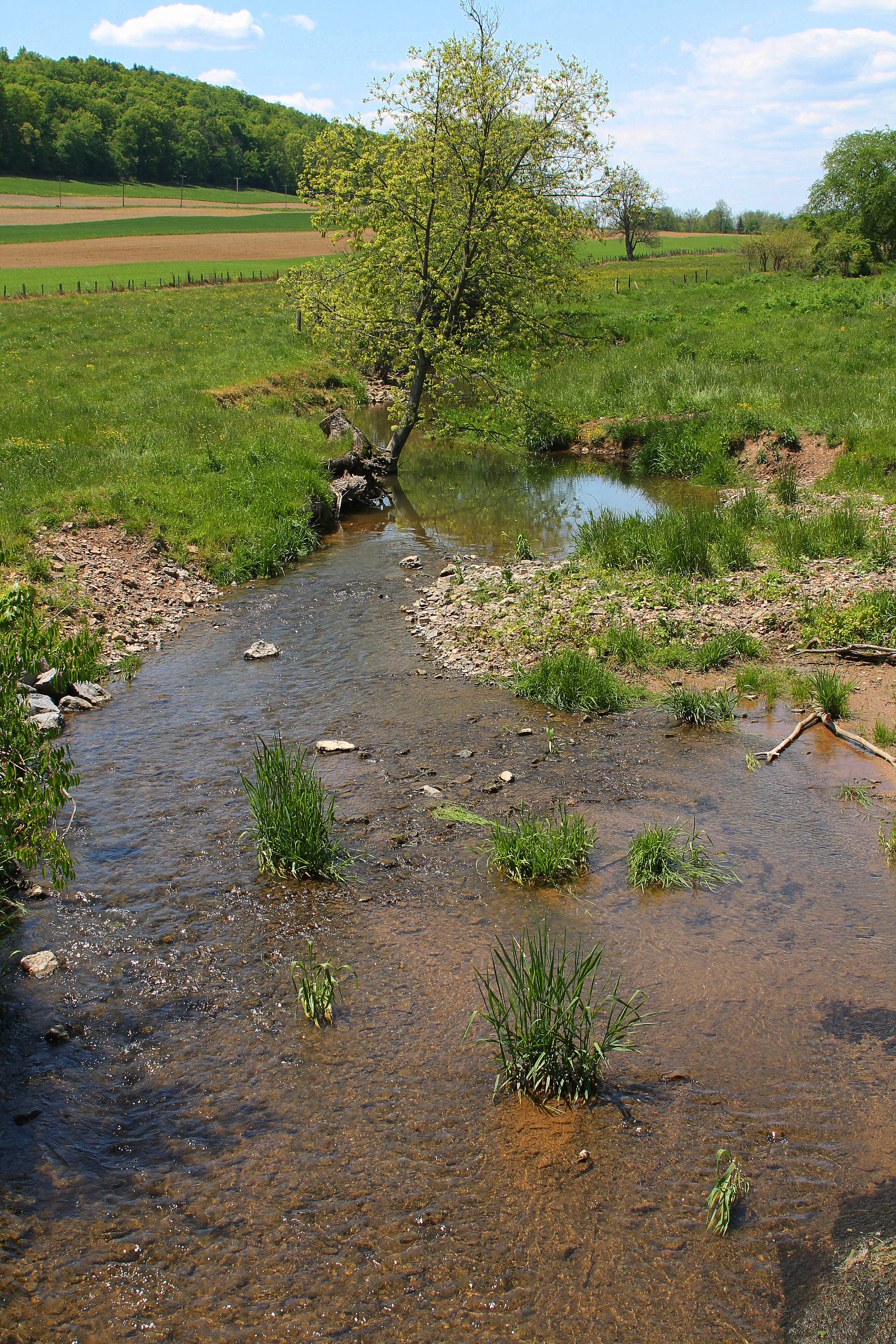
- Susquehecka Creek looking upstream in its lower reaches

Physical characteristics
- Source
  - location: Pleasant Valley in Washington Township, Snyder County, Pennsylvania
  - elevation: 614 ft (187 m)
- Mouth
  - location: Middle Creek in Washington Township, Snyder County, Pennsylvania
  - coordinates: 40°46′28″N 76°54′09″W
  - elevation: 436 ft (133 m)
- Length: 5.4 mi (8.7 km)
- Basin size: 9.44 mi^{2} (24.4 km^{2})

Basin features
- Progression: Middle Creek → Penns Creek → Susquehanna River → Chesapeake Bay
- Tributaries
  - left: Dry Run

Susquehecka Creek, once known as Freeburg Creek or Freeburg Run, is a tributary of Middle Creek in Snyder County, Pennsylvania, in the United States. It is approximately 5.4 miles (8.7 km) long and flows through Washington Township and Freeburg. The watershed of the creek has an area of 9.44 square miles (24.4 km^{2}). The creek has one named tributary, Dry Run. Part of Susquehecka Creek is impaired by sedimentation/siltation due to agriculture. A number of bridges have been constructed over the creek. Its watershed is designated as a Coldwater Fishery and a Migratory Fishery.

== Course ==
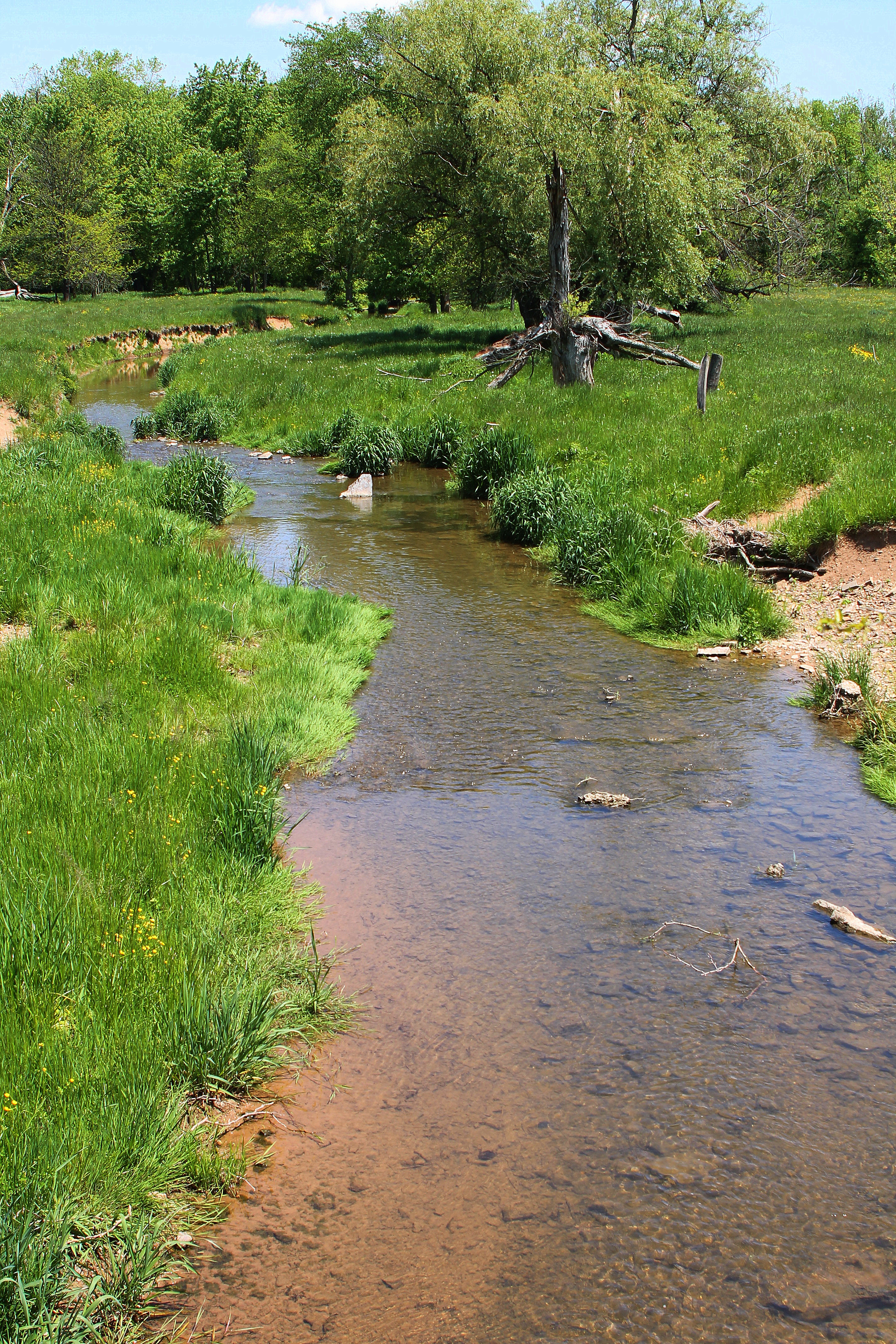
Susquehecka Creek looking downstream in its lower reaches

Susquehecka Creek begins in a broad valley known as Pleasant Valley, in Washington Township. It flows east-northeast for a few miles alongside Pennsylvania Route 35, crossing it twice. As the creek nears Freeburg, it receives the tributary Dry Run from the left and turns northeast, entering Freeburg. After a few tenths of a mile, it turns east-southeast for a short distance and reenters Washington Township before turning east-northeast, continuing to follow Pennsylvania Route 35. After more than a mile, the creek arrives at the end of Pleasant Valley and reaches its confluence with Middle Creek.

Susquehecka Creek joins Middle Creek 3.22 miles (5.18 km) upstream of its mouth.

=== Tributaries ===
Susquehecka Creek has one named tributary, which is known as Dry Run. Dry Run joins Susquehecka Creek 2.64 miles (4.25 km) upstream of its mouth, at Freeburg, and drains an area of 1.83 square miles (4.7 km^{2}).

== Hydrology ==
A reach of Susquehecka Creek is designated as an impaired waterbody. The cause of the impairment is siltation/sedimentation and the likely source of the impairment is grazing-related agriculture.

== Geography and geology ==
The elevation near the mouth of Susquehecka Creek is 436 feet (133 m) above sea level. The elevation of the creek's source is 614 feet (187 m) above sea level. The creek is a relatively small stream.

In the middle of the 20th century, the channel of Susquehecka Creek was significantly modified and relocated. The modifications included straightening, adding dikes, cleaning, and widening and deepening. A. Joseph Armstrong's book Trout Unlimited's Guide to Pennsylvania Limestone Streams described the creek as "yet another alleged limestone stream in an area with little appeal".

== Watershed ==
The watershed of Susquehecka Creek has an area of 9.44 square miles (24.4 km^{2}). The mouth of the creek is in the United States Geological Survey quadrangle of Freeburg. However, its source is in the quadrangle of Dalmatia.

Flooding has been known to occur along Susquehecka Creek and its tributary Dry Run in the borough of Freeburg.

The designated use of Susquehecka Creek is aquatic life.

== History ==
Susquehecka Creek was entered into the Geographic Names Information System on August 2, 1979. Its identifier in the Geographic Names Information System is 1189115. The creek is also known as Freeburg Creek or Freeburg Run. The former variant name appears in a 1953 United States Geological Survey map. However in 1965, USGS agent William L. Cain discovered that no locals had heard of the name "Freeburg Creek", and that every local he spoke to—including the then-mayor of Freeburg, a postmaster, a farmer, and a retired man—knew the creek as "Susquehecka Creek", though only two people he spoke to knew how to spell it. The name "Susquehecka Creek" had already been in use for many years by 1965.

A concrete tee beam bridge carrying State Route 2003 over Susquehecka Creek was built in 1937, 1 mile (1.6 km) south of Freeburg and is 42.0 feet (12.8 m) long. A prestressed box beam or girders bridge carrying Pennsylvania Route 35 across the creek was built in 2008, 3 miles (4.8 km) east of Fremont and is 64.0 feet (19.5 m) long. This bridge replaced a steel bridge built over the creek in 1952.

== Biology ==
The drainage basin of Susquehecka Creek is designated as a Coldwater Fishery and a Migratory Fishery. The creek has been officially proposed for future listing as a wild trout stream.

== See also ==
- Kern Run, next tributary of Middle Creek going upstream
- List of rivers of Pennsylvania
