= West Little Owyhee River =

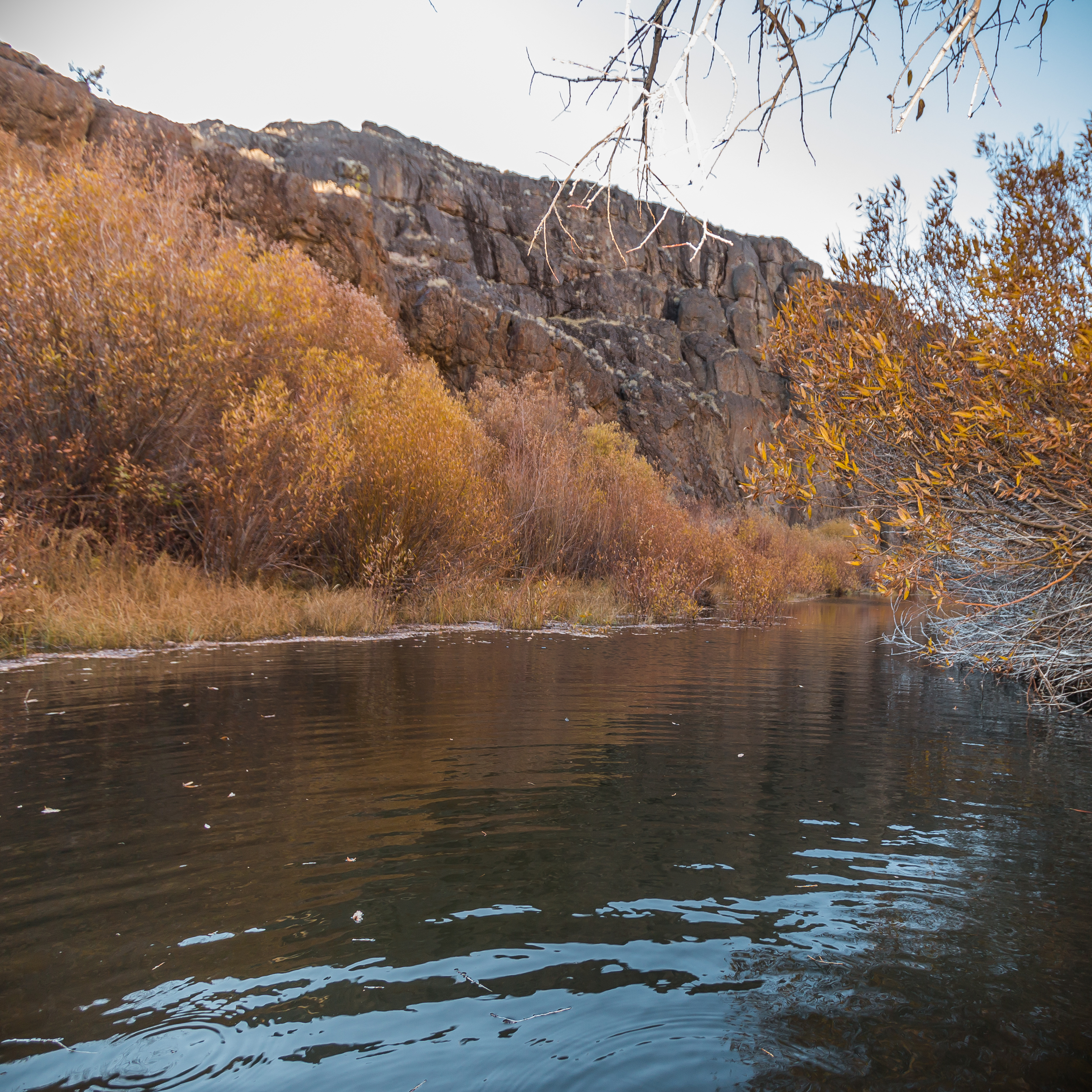
- The West Little Owyhee River

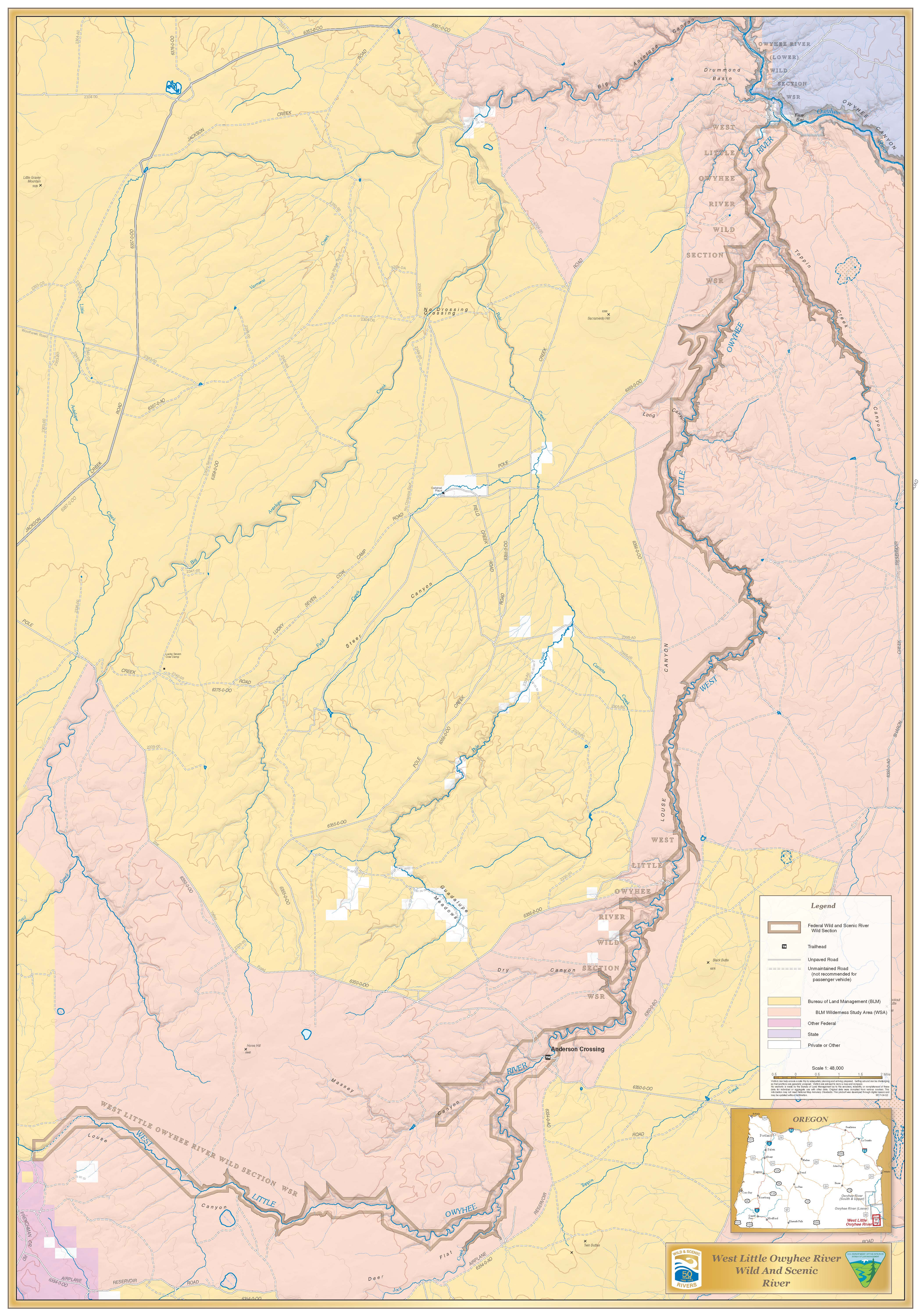
- A partial map of the West Little Owyhee River

- Location of the mouth of West Little Owyhee River in Oregon
- Etymology: An early name for Hawaii.

Location
- Country: United States
- State: Oregon
- County: Malheur

Physical characteristics
- Source
  - location: near McDermitt
  - coordinates: 42°06′30″N 117°35′03″W
  - elevation: 6,508 ft (1,984 m)
- Mouth: Owyhee River
  - location: Oregon
  - coordinates: 42°27′10″N 117°12′34″W
  - elevation: 4,373 ft (1,333 m)
- Length: 63 mi (101 km)
- Basin size: 310 sq mi (800 km^{2})
- Discharge
  - average: 18 cu ft/s (0.51 m^{3}/s)

National Wild and Scenic River
- Type: Wild
- Designated: October 28, 1988

West Little Owyhee River is a 63.1-mile-long (101.5 km) tributary of the Owyhee River in the U.S. state of Oregon. The source of the river is at an elevation of 6,508 feet (1,984 m) near McDermitt, while the mouth is at an elevation of 4,373 feet (1,333 m) in the Owyhee Desert. West Little Owyhee River has a 310-square-mile (800 km^{2}) watershed.

The river begins east of McDermitt and flows east by Deer Flat and into Louse Canyon. Near Twin Buttes, it turns sharply north, still in Louse Canyon, which it follows through the Owyhee Desert all the way to the Owyhee River in Owyhee Canyon. The entire river is protected as part of the National Wild and Scenic Rivers System.

Overseen by the Bureau of Land Management, the river offers fishing for smallmouth bass and trout, and the canyon area is scenic. Dispersed camping is allowed, although the watershed has no developed parks or campsites. Other forms of recreation include hiking, backpacking, hunting, picnicking, and biking.

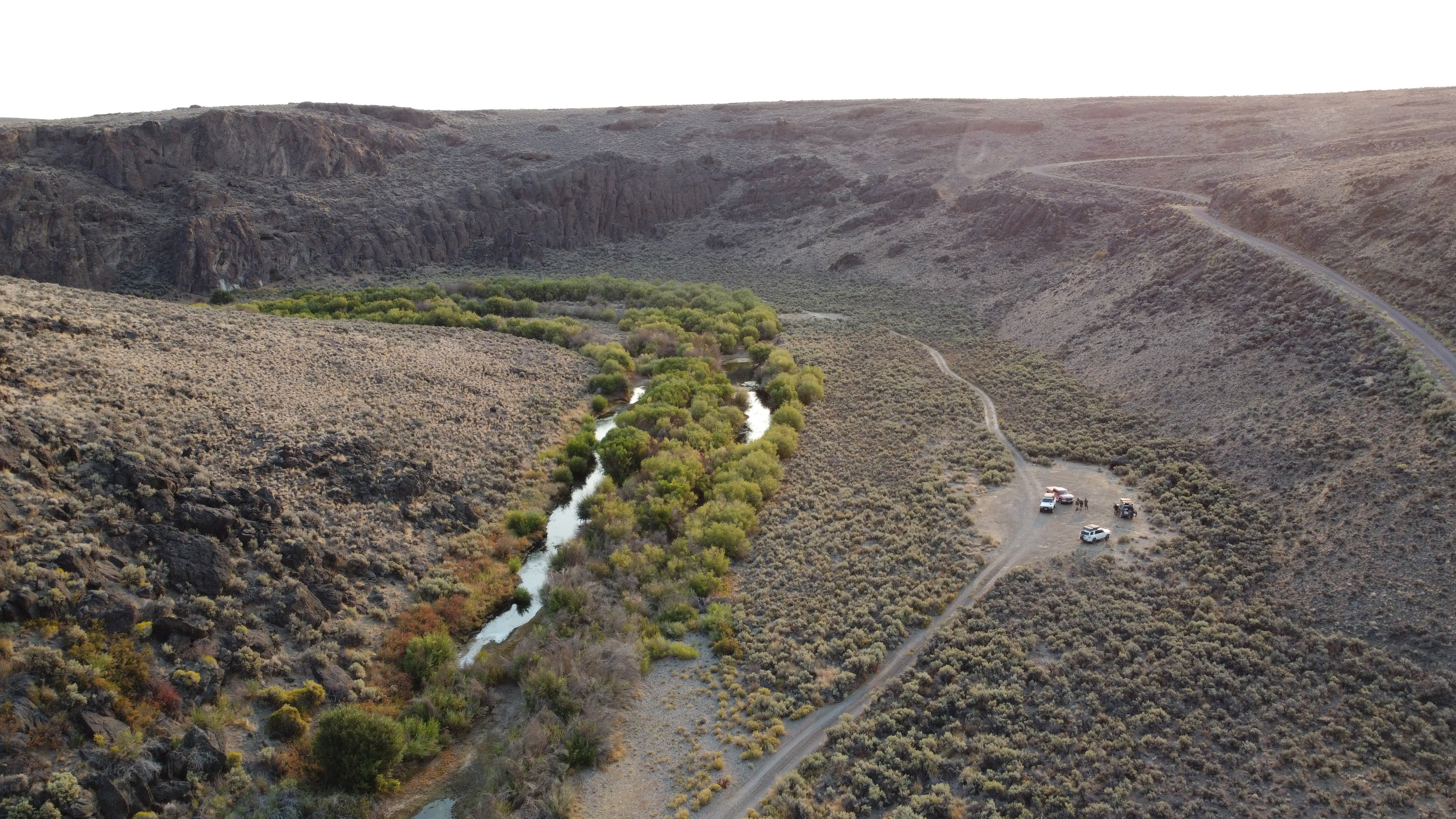
Anderson Crossing campground (no services) on the West Little Owyhee River.

Named tributaries from source to mouth are Lake Fork West Owyhee River, Jack Creek, Little Spring Creek, and Toppin Creek, which all enter from the right had side bank. Further downstream, Cave Creek enters from the left.

== See also ==
- List of rivers of Oregon
- List of longest streams of Oregon
