= Lake Fork West Owyhee River =

- Location of the mouth of the Lake Fork West Owyhee River in Oregon
- Etymology: An early name for Hawaii.

Location
- Country: United States
- State: Oregon
- County: Malheur County

Physical characteristics
- Source: Cat, Bend, and Pedroli springs
  - location: near Fort McDermitt Indian Reservation
  - coordinates: 42°02′59″N 117°29′35″W
  - elevation: 6,275 ft (1,913 m)
- Mouth: West Little Owyhee River
  - location: Louse Canyon
  - coordinates: 42°05′13″N 117°28′11″W
  - elevation: 6,053 ft (1,845 m)

The Lake Fork West Owyhee River is a short tributary of the West Little Owyhee River in the U.S. state of Oregon. The river begins near Cat, Bend, and Pedroli springs near the eastern boundary of the Fort McDermitt Indian Reservation in southern Malheur County. It flows generally northeast to meet the larger river in Louse Canyon. The Lake Fork has no named tributaries.

== See also ==
- List of rivers of Oregon
