= Dry Fork (Salt River tributary) =

Stream in the U.S. state of Missouri

Dry Fork is a stream in Ralls County in the U.S. state of Missouri. It is a tributary of Mark Twain Lake on the Salt River.

The stream headwaters arise at 39°25′35″N 91°36′28″W about 3.5 miles east of the community of Perry. The stream flows generally north passing under Missouri Route K and Missouri Route 19 and on to enter the waters of Mark Twain Lake south of the Ray Behrens Recreation Area. Prior to the impounding of the lake Dry Fork entered Lick Creek at 39°30′07″N 91°38′55″W.

Dry Fork was named for the fact it often ran dry.

== See also ==
- List of rivers of Missouri
