= Dry Fork (North Moreau Creek tributary) =

Stream in the U.S. state of Missouri

Coordinates: 38°37′30″N 92°39′01″W

Dry Fork is a stream in Moniteau County in the U.S. state of Missouri. It is a tributary of North Moreau Creek.

The stream headwaters are located one mile east of Tipton at an elevation of approximately 920 feet. The stream flows to the east-southeast passing under US Route 50 and continues for approximately six miles to its confluence with North Moreau Creek about four miles west of California. The confluence is at an elevation of 741 feet.

Dry Fork was so named as its streambed is typically dry.
