= Dry River =

Dry River may refer to:

== Waterways ==
In Australia

- Dry River (New South Wales), a tributary of the Murrah River in the South Coast region of New South Wales
- Dry River (Northern Territory)
- Dry River (Queensland), a tributary of the Burdekin River
- Dry River (Victoria), a tributary of the Mitchell River catchment in the Alpine region of Victoria

In Jamaica

- Dry River (Jamaica)

In New Zealand

- Dry River (Tasman), a river in the South Island
- Dry River (Wellington), a river in the North Island

In the United States

- Dry River (Crooked River tributary), a river in Oregon
- Dry River (New Hampshire)
- Dry River (Virginia)

== Other uses ==
- "Dry River", a song by Dave Alvin from his album Blue Blvd

== See also ==
- Dry Creek (disambiguation)
- Dry (disambiguation)
- Dry Brook (disambiguation)
