= Dry Creek (Cottonwood River tributary) =

River in Minnesota, United States

Coordinates: 44°9′38.5″N 95°11′46″W

Dry Creek is a stream in Redwood and Cottonwood counties, in the U.S. state of Minnesota. It is a tributary of the Cottonwood River.

Dry Creek was named from the fact it is a losing stream during times of drought.

== See also ==
- List of rivers of Minnesota
