= Dry (surname) =

Dry is a surname. Notable people with the surname include:

- Amity Dry (born 1978), Australian singer-songwriter
- Avis M. Dry (1922–2007), British psychologist
- Chris Dry (born 1988), South African rugby union player
- Claud Dry, co-founder of Midget Motors Corporation
- Corné Dry (born 1993), South African cricketer
- F. A. Dry (born 1931), American football player coach
- Francis Dry (1891–1979), New Zealand geneticist, biologist, university lecturer and wool researcher
- Jodie Dry (born 1974), Australian actress
- Mark Dry (born 1987), Scottish hammer thrower
- Murray Dry, American political scientist
- Richard Dry (1815–1869), Australian politician
- Stuart Dry, Australian slalom canoeist
- Tim Dry (born 1952), English actor

== See also ==
- Helen Aristar-Dry, American linguist
