= Dry Run (Lehigh River tributary) =

Physical characteristics
- Source
  - location: flat area west of Sauerkraut Hill in Allen Township, Northampton County, Pennsylvania
  - elevation: 459 ft (140 m)
- Mouth
  - location: Lehigh River in Northampton, Northampton County, Pennsylvania
  - coordinates: 40°40′18″N 75°29′06″W
  - elevation: 282 ft (86 m)
- Length: 2.6 mi (4.2 km)
- Basin size: 2.46 sq mi (6.4 km^{2})

Basin features
- Progression: Lehigh River → Delaware River → Delaware Bay

Dry Run is a tributary of the Lehigh River in Northampton County, Pennsylvania, in the United States. It is approximately 2.6 miles (4.2 km) long and flows through Allen Township and Northampton. The stream is designated as a Coldwater Fishery and a Migratory Fishery. It is often dry.

== Course ==
Dry Run begins in a flat area west of Sauerkraut Hill in Allen Township. It flows south for several tenths of a mile before crossing Pennsylvania Route 329 and continuing to flow south. The stream eventually begins to gradually turn southwest and enters Northampton. Here, it flows west-southwest for a few tenths of a mile before turning southwest for several tenths of a mile. The stream then reaches its confluence with the Lehigh River.

Dry Run joins the Lehigh River 22.14 miles (35.63 km) upstream of its mouth.

== Geography and geology ==
The elevation near the mouth of Dry Run is 282 feet (86 m) above sea level. The elevation near the stream's source is 459 feet (140 m) above sea level.

== Watershed ==
The watershed of Dry Run has an area of 2.46 square miles (6.4 km^{2}). The stream is entirely within the United States Geological Survey quadrangle of Catasauqua.

Polluted stormwater in Allen Township has the potential to impact Dry Run. However, an NPDES permit was once issued for discharge of stormwater into the stream, associated with construction activities. The stream frequently is dry.

== History ==
Dry Run was entered into the Geographic Names Information System on August 2, 1979. Its identifier in the Geographic Names Information System is 1173531.

In 1787, Christian Schwartz constructed a large stone house at the mouth of Dry Run.

A lost Pratt through truss bridge was once built over Dry Run for the Lehigh Valley Transit Co. Historically, a trolley bridge crossed the stream and a school was located near this bridge. In 2014, the Delaware and Lehigh National Heritage Corridor received $217,000 from the Pennsylvania Department of Community and Economic Development to replace a pedestrian bridge over the stream.

== Biology ==
The drainage basin of Dry Run is designated as a Coldwater Fishery and a Migratory Fishery.

== See also ==
- Coplay Creek, next tributary of the Lehigh River going downriver
- Hokendauqua Creek, next tributary of the Lehigh River going upriver
- List of rivers of Pennsylvania
