= Dry Fork (Plattin Creek tributary) =

Stream in the U.S. state of Missouri

Dry Fork is a stream in Jefferson, St. Francois and Ste. Genevieve counties in the U.S. state of Missouri. It is a tributary of Plattin Creek.

The stream headwaters arise in eastern St. Francois County at 37°59′40″N 90°22′05″W at an elevation of about 1040 feet. The stream flows to the northeast into Ste. Genevieve County just north of the Goose Creek Lake community. The stream flows north through the west portion of Ste. Genevieve County and enters Jefferson County. It enters Plattin Creek just north of the Missouri Route T bridge at 38°05′42″N 90°23′51″W.

Dry Fork was named for the fact it often runs dry.

== See also ==
- List of rivers of Missouri
