= Dry Run (Susquehecka Creek tributary) =

Physical characteristics
- Source
  - location: deep valley in Washington Township, Snyder County, Pennsylvania
  - elevation: 953 ft (290 m)
- Mouth
  - location: Susquehecka Creek in Washington Township, Snyder County, Pennsylvania
  - coordinates: 40°45′25″N 76°56′37″W
  - elevation: 502 ft (153 m)
- Length: 2.9 mi (4.7 km)
- Basin size: 1.83 mi^{2} (4.7 km^{2})

Basin features
- Progression: Susquehecka Creek → Middle Creek → Penns Creek → Susquehanna River → Chesapeake Bay
- Tributaries
  - left: one unnamed tributary

Dry Run is a tributary of Susquehecka Creek in Snyder County, Pennsylvania, in the United States. It is approximately 2.9 miles (4.7 km) long and flows through Washington Township and Freeburg. The watershed of the stream has an area of 1.83 square miles (4.7 km^{2}). The stream has one unnamed tributary. Both Dry Run and its unnamed tributary are impaired by siltation due to agriculture. Dry Run has been known to experience flooding in Freeburg.

== Course ==
Dry Run begins in a deep valley in Washington Township. It flows east-southeast for several tenths of a mile, receiving an unnamed tributary from the left and passing near White Top. The stream then continues flowing east-southeast for several tenths of a mile, leaving its valley and entering the much broader Pleasant Valley. Here, it turns south-southeast and then southeast for a few tenths of a mile before turning east-southeast. After several tenths of a mile, it turns southeast for a few tenths of a mile, entering Freeburg, crossing Pennsylvania Route 35, reentering Washington Township, and reaching its confluence with Susquehecka Creek.

Dry Run joins Susquehecka Creek 2.64 miles (4.25 km) upstream of its mouth.

=== Tributaries ===
Dry Run has no named tributaries. However, it does have one unnamed tributary. This tributary is approximately 0.5 miles (0.80 km) long and flows through Washington Township, near White Top.

== Hydrology, geography, and geology ==
The elevation near the mouth of Dry Run is 502 feet (153 m) above sea level. The elevation of the stream's source is 953 feet (290 m) above sea level.

A total of 2.9 miles (4.7 km) of Dry Run is designated as an impaired waterbody. The impairment is siltation due to agricultural activity. A total of 0.55 miles (0.89 km) of the stream's unnamed tributary also have this impairment.

== Watershed and biology ==
The watershed of Dry Run has an area of 1.83 square miles (4.7 km^{2}). The stream is entirely within the United States Geological Survey quadrangle of Freeburg.

Flooding has been known to occur along Dry Run in the borough of Freeburg.

Dry Run has been officially proposed for wild trout designation from its headwaters downstream to its mouth.

== History ==
Dry Run was entered into the Geographic Names Information System on August 2, 1979. Its identifier in the Geographic Names Information System is 1173532.

The Pennsylvania Fish and Boat Commission will consider adding Dry Run to its official list of wild trout streams in its meeting on January 20 and January 21, 2016.

== See also ==
- List of rivers of Pennsylvania
