= Dry Creek (Flat River tributary) =

Stream in the American state of Missouri

Coordinates: 37.81451°N 90.57929°W

Dry Creek is a stream in St. Francois County in the U.S. state of Missouri. It is a tributary of the Flat River.

Dry Creek was named for the fact it often runs dry.

== See also ==
- List of rivers of Missouri
