= Dry Fork (Charrette Creek tributary) =

Stream in the US state of Missouri

Coordinates: 38.651994°N 91.119870°W

Dry Fork is a stream in Warren County in the U.S. state of Missouri. It is a tributary of Charrette Creek. A variant name is "Little Charrette Creek".

Dry Fork was named for its usually dry condition.

== See also ==
- List of rivers of Missouri
