= Dry Brook =

Dry Brook may refer to:

== New Jersey, United States ==
- Dry Brook (Paulins Kill tributary)

== New York, United states ==
- Dry Brook (Cannonsville Reservoir tributary)
- Dry Brook (Corbett, New York)
- Dry Brook (East Branch Delaware River)
- Dry Brook (East Brook)
- Dry Brook (Elk Creek tributary)
- Dry Brook (Horton Brook tributary)
- Dry Brook (Read Creek)
- Dry Brook (Sands Creek tributary)
- Dry Brook (Trout Brook tributary)
- Dry Brook Ridge, a ridge in the Catskill Mountains

== See also ==
- Dry Creek (disambiguation)
- Dry River (disambiguation)
