= Dry Creek, West Virginia =

Community in Raleigh County, West Virginia

- Unincorporated community
- Location within West Virginia Location within the United States
- Coordinates: 37°51′35″N 81°27′49″W
- Country: United States
- State: West Virginia
- County: Raleigh
- Elevation: 1,263 ft (385 m)
- Time zone: UTC-5 (Eastern (EST))
  - Summer (DST): UTC-4 (EDT)
- ZIP code: 25062
- Area codes: 304 & 681
- GNIS feature ID: 1538347

Dry Creek is an unincorporated community in Raleigh County, West Virginia, United States. Dry Creek is located on West Virginia Route 3 16 miles (26 km) west-northwest of Beckley. Dry Creek has a post office with ZIP code 25062.

== Climate ==
The climate in this area has mild differences between highs and lows, and there is adequate rainfall year-round. According to the Köppen Climate Classification system, Dry Creek has a marine west coast climate, abbreviated "Cfb" on climate maps.
