= Dry (song) =

Single by Rancid Eddie
- Released: 26 September 2021
- Genre: Indie rock
- Length: 3:10
- Songwriter(s): Andrew Sturrock; Ashley Ravlic; Edward O'Brien; Jessy Kelly; Matthew Sturrock
- Producer(s): Jiroe

Rancid Eddie singles chronology
"Champagne" (2021)	"Dry" (2021)	"Chai Latte" (2022)

Music video
- "Dry" on YouTube

"Dry" is a song by Australian indie rock band Rancid Eddie, released independently on 26 September 2021. Originally teased as an acoustic track on social media platform TikTok, the song is a layered, indie rock track. It was written by the band's five members, brothers Andrew and Matthew Sturrock, Ashley Ravlic, Edward O'Brien, and Jessy Kelly, and produced by record producer Jiroe.

"Dry" became their debut chart appearance, peaking at number 17 on the ARIA Singles Chart, number 40 on the New Zealand Singles Chart, and number 64 on the Irish Singles Chart.

== Background and release ==
"Dry" was originally teased on social media platform TikTok, where Rancid Eddie uploaded a video of them performing an acoustic version of the song. The video garnered significant attention on the platform, receiving several million views, and leading to calls from fans for an official release.

The band describe the song as being about "realising a relationship is over before it is, and the pains of falling out of love with someone."

"Dry" was premiered on Triple J's "2021" program with Richard Kingsmill on 26 September 2021, before being released later that day. The single's release was described as being highly anticipated by the band's fanbase.

== Composition ==
"Dry" is an indie rock track, which features a "more layered sound" compared to its initial demo. The song "[touches] on the narrative of a relationship losing its spark" and "sweeps in with a misty cloud of hazy guitar chords and impassioned vocals dripping in a restrained, Aussie accent." It additionally features an "[explosion] into a crash of falling guitar chords and a flood of backing vocals", which gives the listener "the feeling of being surrounded by the whole band."

== Critical reception ==
The Michigan Daily's Ryan Brave was neutral in his review of "Dry", feeling the song wasn't "as anthemic" as the early version of it circulating on social media, adding that it "builds into its climax much less organically than the original." Despite this, Brace said that it "retains much of its initial allure", and stated that the band "had done the song justice". Labelling it a "brazen, blunt single", Joe Beer of Ones to Watch called the song a "woozy, gritty release", and likened it that of the Strokes and Australian rock band Sticky Fingers. He concluded his review by stating it was a "feel-good track". Volatile Weekly writer Jarod praised the song, saying it was a "paradise of hazy guitar chords", which "radiates a youthful dew of hope and angst." Writing for Earmilk, Chloe Robinson felt the song's "cheerful backdrop [was] juxtaposed" with its message, adding that the listener will "instantly get those feel-good vibes".

== Commercial performance ==
In Australia, "Dry" debuted and peaked at number 60 on the ARIA Singles Chart for the week beginning 4 October 2021. On the chart dated 11 October, the song rose 43 places, reaching a new peak of number 17. In Ireland, the song debuted at number 64 on the Irish Singles Chart on 9 October 2021. In New Zealand, it debuted at number 4 on the Hot Singles Chart on the chart dated 3 October 2021, before entering the Top 40 Singles Chart at number 40 the following week.

== Credits and personnel ==
Adapted from Spotify.

Rancid Eddie

- Andrew Sturrock – writing, performance
- Ashley Ravlic – writing, performance
- Edward O'Brien – writing, performance
- Jessy Kelly – writing, performance
- Matthew Sturrock – writing, performance

Other musicians

- Jiroe – producer, mixing engineer

== Charts ==
Chart performance for "Dry"
Chart (2021)	Peak position
Australia (ARIA)	17
Ireland (IRMA)	64
New Zealand (Recorded Music NZ)	40

== Release history ==
Release dates and formats for "Dry"
Region	Date	Format(s)	Version	Label	Ref.
Various	26 September 2021	Digital download; streaming	Original	Rancid Eddie (independent)	
