= Dry Creek (Big Piney River tributary) =

Stream in the American state of Missouri

Dry Creek is a stream in Pulaski County, Missouri. It is a tributary of the Big Piney River.

The stream headwaters are within Fort Leonard Wood at 37°46′49″N 92°08′17″W and its confluence with the Big Piney is about two miles upstream from Devils Elbow at 37°49′33″N 92°05′03″W.

Dry Creek was so named for the fact it often runs dry.

== See also ==
- List of rivers of Missouri
