= Dry Creek (Georgia) =

Stream in the state of Georgia

Coordinates: 34°55′25″N 85°09′50″W

Dry Creek is a stream in Catoosa County and Whitfield County, Georgia, in the United States.

Dry Creek was named from the fact it runs dry in times of drought.

== See also ==
- List of rivers of Georgia (U.S. state)
