= Big Dry Creek =

Big Dry Creek may refer to:

- Big Dry Creek (Littleton, Colorado), a tributary of the South Platte River
- Big Dry Creek (Westminster, Colorado), a tributary of the South Platte River
