= Dry Creek (Twelvemile Creek tributary) =

Stream in the American state of Missouri

Coordinates: 37.3758856°N 90.3962272°W

Dry Creek is a stream in Madison County in the U.S. state of Missouri. It is a tributary of Twelvemile Creek.

Dry Creek was named for its tendency to run dry.

== See also ==
- List of rivers of Missouri
