= Dry Creek (James River tributary) =

Stream in the U.S. state of Missouri

Dry Creek is a stream in Webster County in the Ozarks of southern Missouri. It is a tributary of the James River.

The stream headwaters are at 37°10′49″N 92°52′37″W and its confluence with the James is at 37°15′56″N 92°56′49″W. The stream source area is just northwest of Diggins and it flows generally northwest to join the James just east of the village of Crown.

Dry Creek was so named for the fact it often runs dry.

== See also ==
- List of rivers of Missouri
