= Dry Fork (Grassy Creek tributary) =

Stream in the US state of Missouri

Coordinates: 39.4633793°N 91.1270841°W

Dry Fork is a stream in Pike County in the U.S. state of Missouri. It is a tributary of Grassy Creek.

Dry Fork was so named because it often runs dry.

== See also ==
- List of rivers of Missouri
