= Dry Creek School (Manhattan, Montana) =

- U.S. National Register of Historic Places
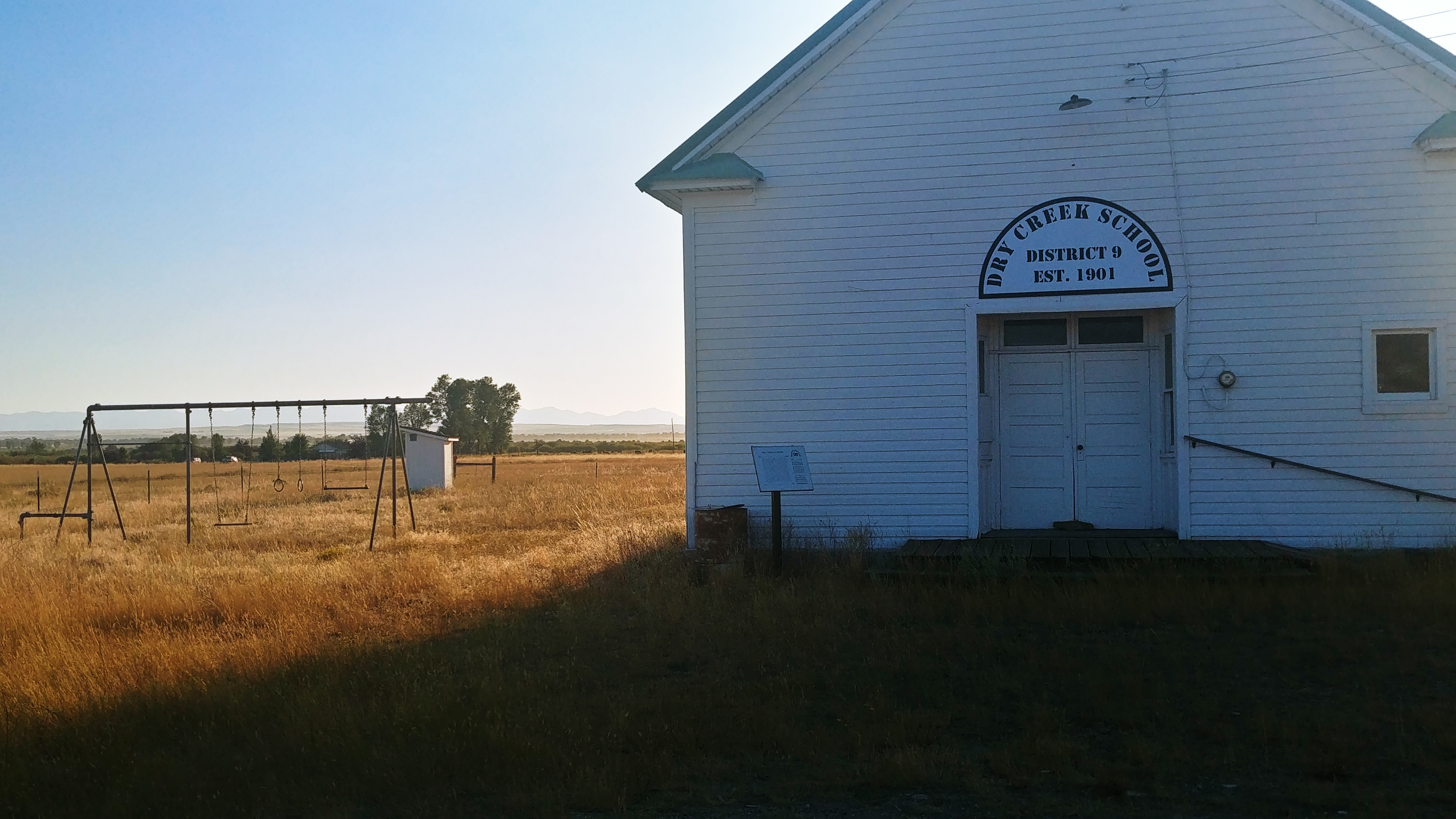

- Location within Montana Location within the United States
- Nearest city: Manhattan, Montana
- Coordinates: 45°52′28″N 111°13′27″W
- Built: 1902
- MPS: One Room Schoolhouses of Gallatin County TR
- NRHP reference No.: 81000360
- Added to NRHP: July 21, 1981

The Dry Creek School in Manhattan, Montana is a balloon-framed one-room schoolhouse that was built in 1902. It was listed on the National Register of Historic Places in 1981.

It has a recessed entry door and a cupola, and it was used as a community center.

It was one of 13 one-room schoolhouses in Gallatin County, Montana that were listed on the National Register together in July 1981, and three more were listed later.
