= Crooked Creek (Oregon) =

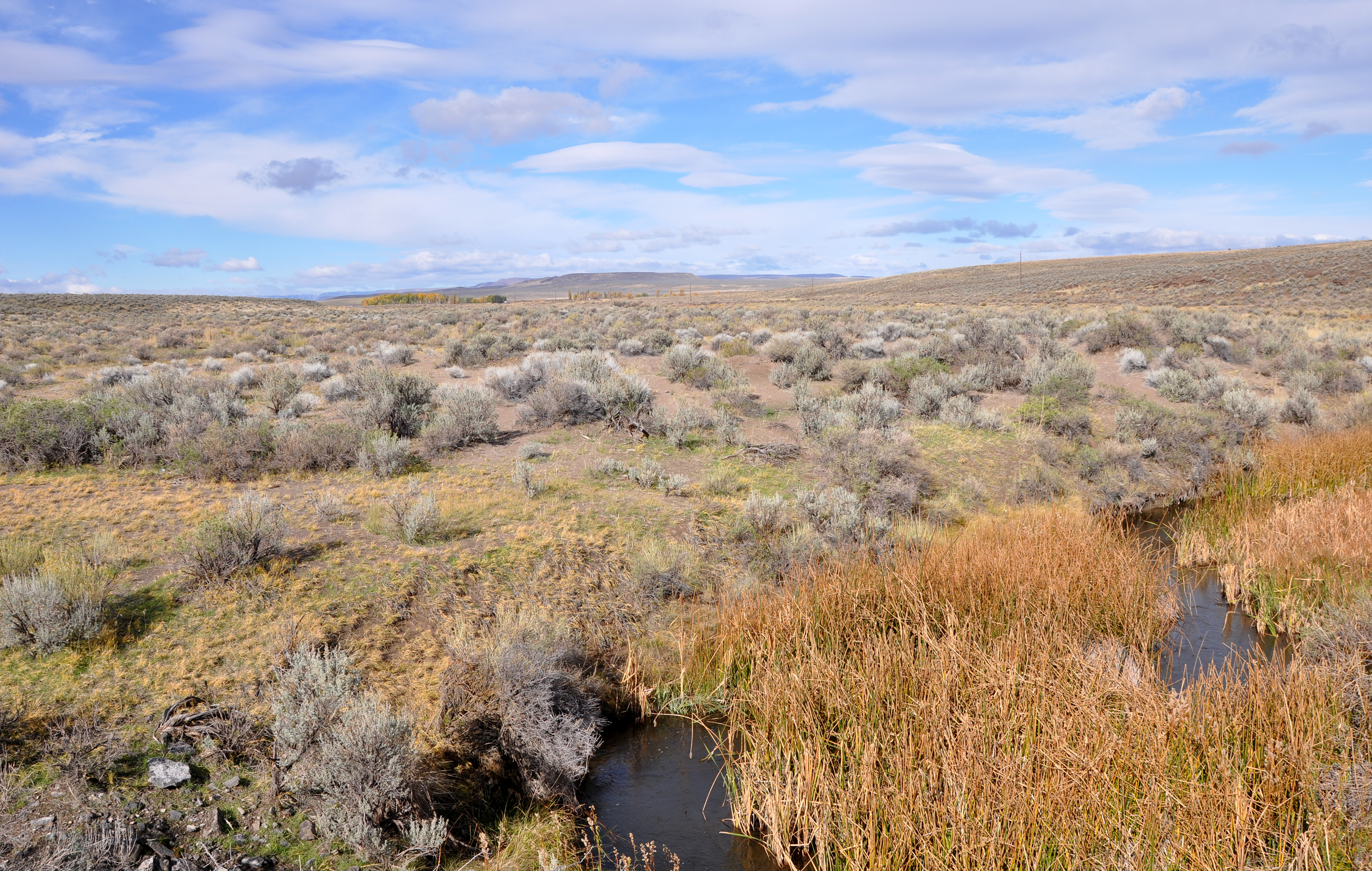
- Crooked Creek south of Burns Junction

- Location of the mouth of Crooked Creek in Oregon

Location
- Country: United States
- State: Oregon
- County: Malheur

Physical characteristics
- Source: Crooked Creek Springs
  - location: Malheur County
  - coordinates: 42°40′32″N 117°54′33″W
  - elevation: 3,921 ft (1,195 m)
- Mouth: Owyhee River
  - location: 4.5 miles (7.2 km) northwest of Rome
  - coordinates: 42°52′57″N 117°41′52″W
  - elevation: 3,343 ft (1,019 m)
- Length: 51 mi (82 km)
- Basin size: 1,340 sq mi (3,500 km^{2})

Crooked Creek is a 51-mile (82 km) tributary of the Owyhee River in the U.S. state of Oregon. The source of Crooked Creek is at an elevation of 3,921 feet (1,195 m) at Crooked Creek Spring, while the mouth is at an elevation of 3,343 feet (1,019 m) near Rome. Crooked Creek has a 1,340-square-mile (3,500 km^{2}) watershed.

== See also ==
- List of rivers of Oregon
- List of longest streams of Oregon
