= Dry Creek (Tennessee River tributary) =

Stream in Alabama and Tennessee, U.S.

Coordinates: 35.0478625°N 88.1778156°W

Dry Creek is a stream in the U.S. states of Alabama and Tennessee. It is a tributary to the Tennessee River.

Dry Creek was descriptively named.
