= Burns Junction, Oregon =

Unincorporated community in the state of Oregon, United States

Burns Junction
- Unincorporated community
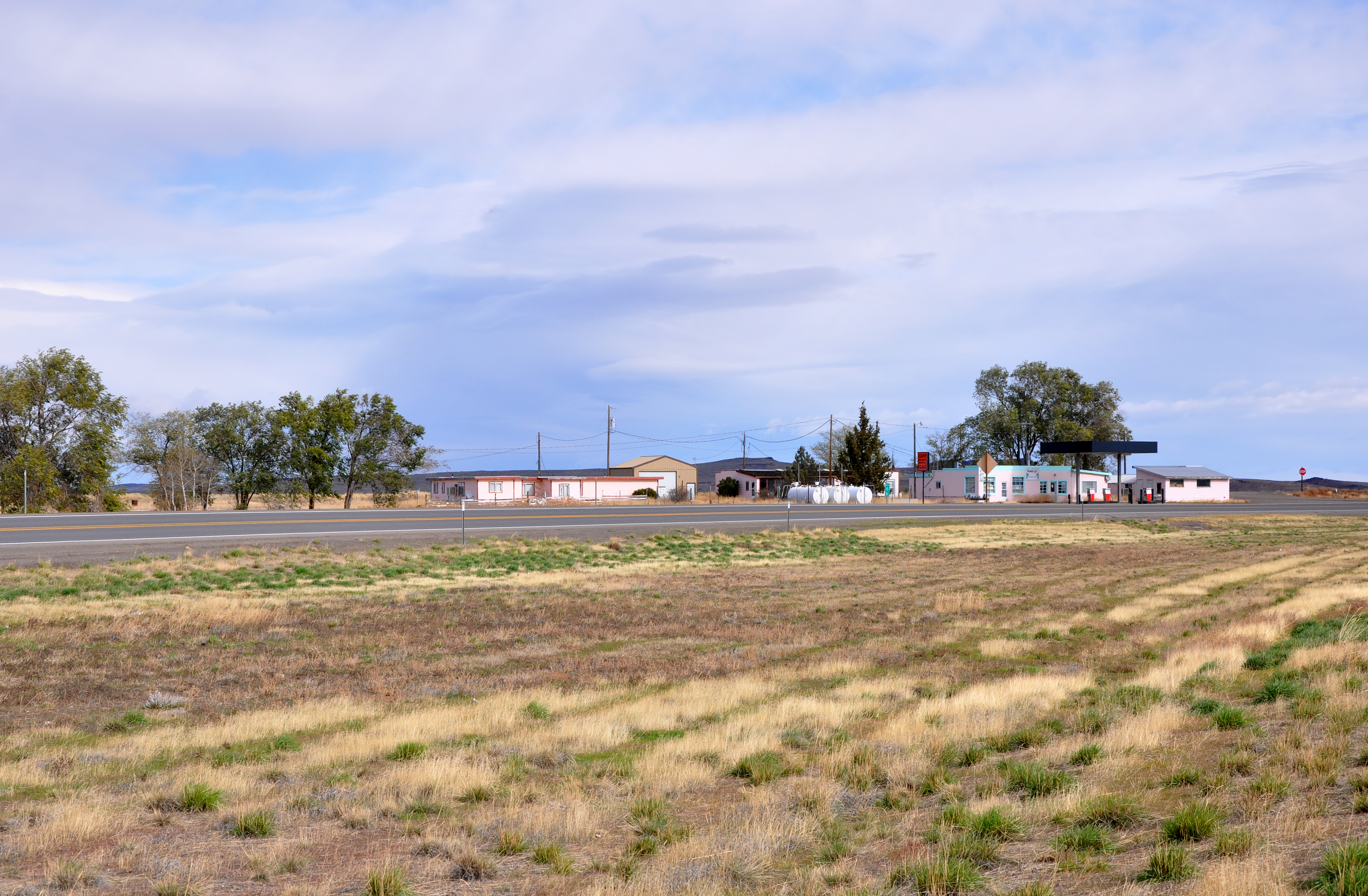

- Location within the state of Oregon Burns Junction (the United States)
- Coordinates: 42°46′37″N 117°51′12″W
- Country: United States
- State: Oregon
- County: Malheur
- Elevation: 3,934 ft (1,199 m)
- Time zone: UTC-7 (Mountain)
  - Summer (DST): UTC-6 (MDT)
- ZIP codes: 97910
- Area code: 541
- Coordinates and elevation from United States Geological Survey

Burns Junction is an unincorporated community located in Malheur County, Oregon, United States, situated at the intersection of U.S. Route 95 and Oregon Route 78, it lies approximately 80 miles (130 km) southeast of the Harney County city of Burns.

== Climate ==
According to the Köppen Climate Classification system, Burns Junction has a semi-arid climate, abbreviated "BSk" on climate maps.

== Education ==
The community is in Arock School District 81, based in Arock.
