= Voltage, Oregon =

Unincorporated community in the state of Oregon, United States

- Unincorporated community
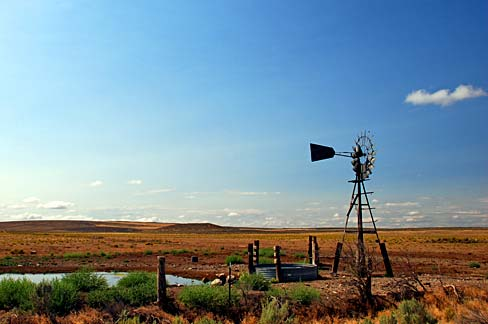
- Windmill near Voltage

- Location within Oregon Location within the United States
- Coordinates: 43°15′41″N 118°48′26″W
- Country: United States
- State: Oregon
- County: Harney
- Elevation: 4,111 ft (1,253 m)
- Time zone: UTC-8 (PST)
  - Summer (DST): UTC-7 (PDT)
- ZIP codes: 97721
- Area code: 541
- GNIS feature ID: 1136872

Voltage is an unincorporated community in Harney County, Oregon, United States. It is approximately 34 miles (55 km) south of Burns, on the south shore of Malheur Lake near the Donner und Blitzen River.

== History ==
Voltage post office was established in 1908 by Walter C. Botsford, the first postmaster, who was interested in electricity and thought that the river could generate enough "voltage" to serve the entire Harney Basin. He had confused voltage with power; a hydropower project was never attempted. The post office closed in 1933. At one time, Voltage had a store and school district; today, however, there is little evidence of a once-thriving community.

== Sodhouse ==
Voltage is about 3 miles (5 km) east of the former community of Sodhouse, near the present-day headquarters of the Malheur National Wildlife Refuge. It was originally the site of a sod house built by a group of local settlers around 1872. The site lent its name to the Sod House Camp of the Civilian Conservation Corps (CCC) and the Sod House Ranch. As of 1978, nothing remained of the sod house but a low rock wall; in 1937 the CCC erected a historic marker at the site. A post office named "Springer" was established near the site of the sod house at Sod House Spring; it was later moved to Narrows and renamed. The Voltage and Narrows school districts were consolidated with the Sod House district in the early 1940s.

== Climate ==
According to the Köppen Climate Classification system, Voltage has a semi-arid climate, abbreviated "BSk" on climate maps.

== Education ==
Voltage is in Harney County School District 4 (Crane School, grades K-8) and Harney County Union High School District 1J (Crane Union High School).
