= Wagontire, Oregon =

Unincorporated community in the state of Oregon, United States

- Unincorporated community
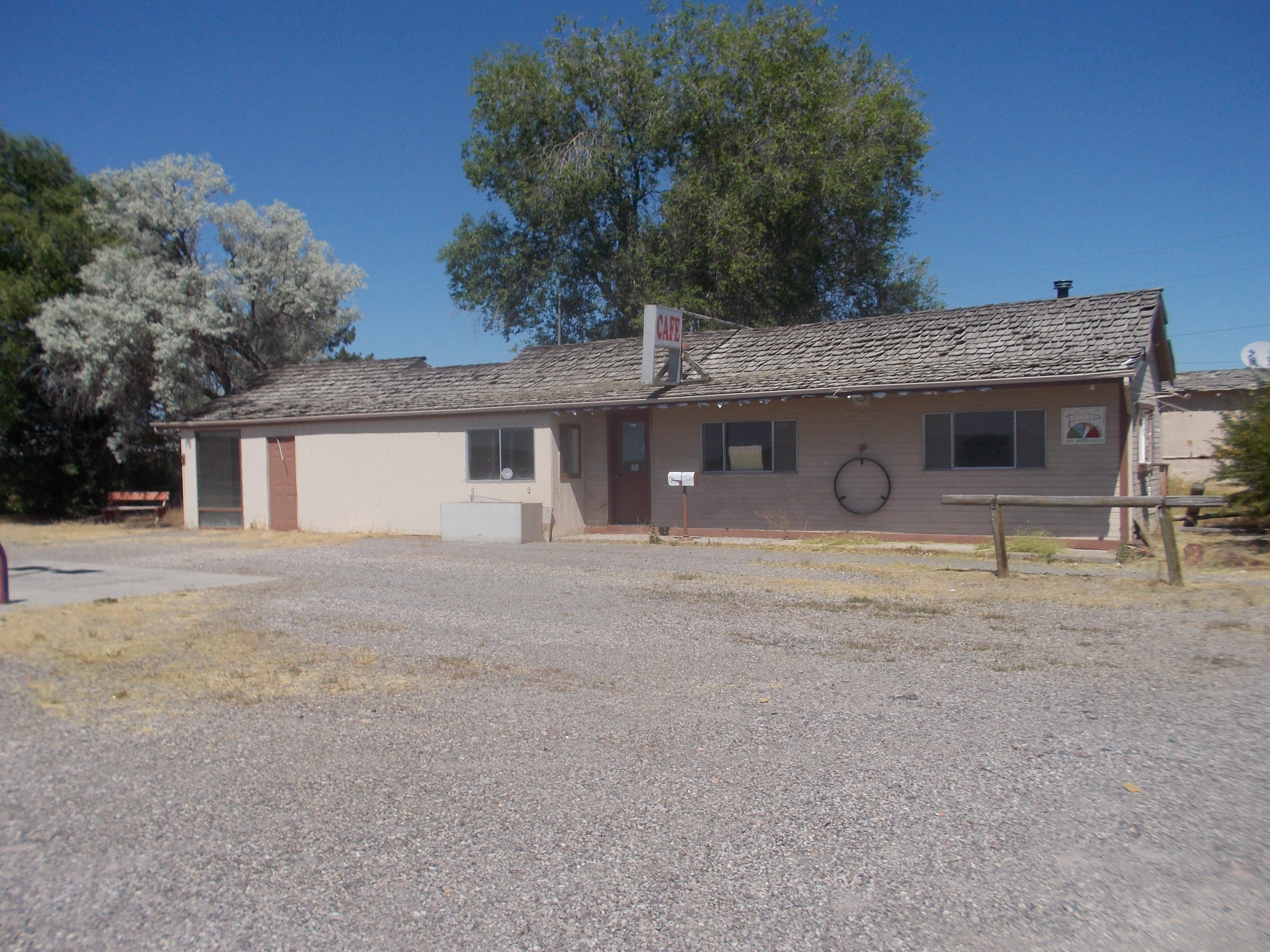
- The Wagontire Cafe

- Location within Oregon Location within the United States
- Coordinates: 43°14′59″N 119°52′30″W
- Country: United States
- State: Oregon
- County: Harney
- Elevation: 4,738 ft (1,444 m)

Population (2010)
  - Total: 2
- Time zone: UTC-8 (PST)
  - Summer (DST): UTC-7 (PDT)
- Area code: 541
- GNIS feature ID: 1136873

Wagontire is an unincorporated community in Harney County, Oregon, United States, along U.S. Route 395.

The community was named after nearby Wagontire Mountain. From 1986 to at least 1997, Wagontire was home to just two people: William and Olgie Warner. The Warners' property included a gas station, cafe, motel, general store, and recreational vehicle (RV) park. Also there was Wagontire Airport, across the road from the buildings. Planes flying into the airport taxied across the highway, and filled up at the gas station.

In summer 1999, the community was purchased by Ellie Downing of Burns, who moved there with her nephew, Jerry Gray.

== Education ==
Wagontire is in Suntex School District 10 (Suntex School, grades K-8) and Harney County Union High School District 1J (Crane Union High School).

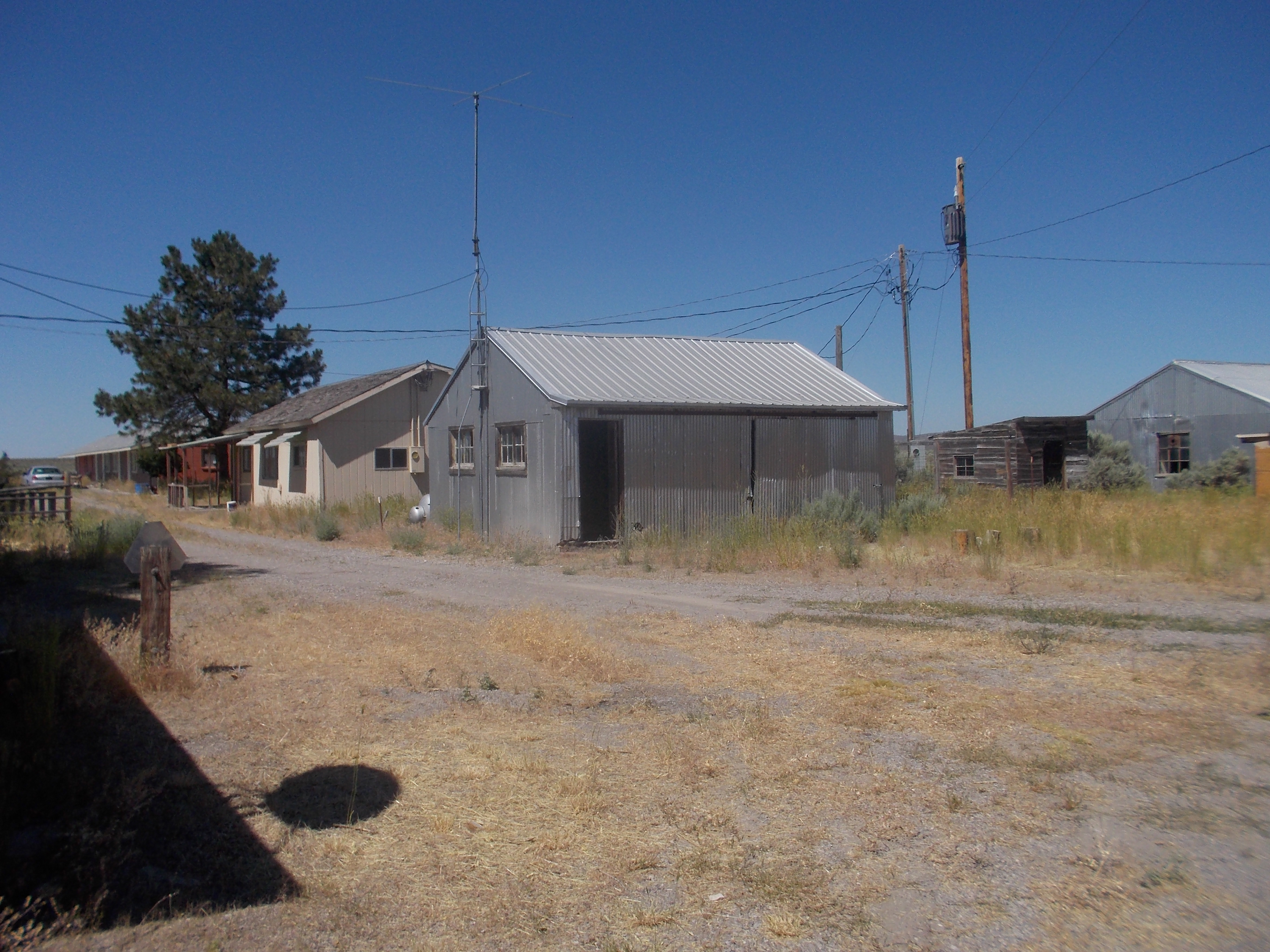
Buildings in Wagontire
