= Lawen Elementary School District =

School district in Oregon, United States

Lawen School District 18 a.k.a. Lawen Elementary School District was a school district headquartered in Lawen, in Harney County, Oregon. It had one school. The school, which had grades 1–8, was a two-room facility, described by The Daily Astorian as "tiny". The school grounds had a septic tank, a well, a horse barn, and a bell tower. Some students rode on horses. The enrollment in a previous era was 18, and the school employed two teachers.

In May 1984, a flood from Malheur Lake went into the school property, with the septic tank and well affected. The foundation was also damaged. Therefore, students went to Crane Elementary on what was supposed to be a temporary basis. Circa 1985 it was anticipated that the waters itself would enter the school building. At the time, nine students had been at Lawen Elementary. United Press International stated that possible repairs would have been "expensive".

In 1985 there was a referendum on whether to merge the Lawen district into the Crane district, but voters turned down the proposal in a referendum. Five people voted against it and four people voted for it. The Lawen school remained closed. The board of trustees, each spring, earmarked money for a re-opening, but this did not happen, and instead it paid the Crane district to teach Lawen students.

In May 1987 another referendum was held, and voters this time favored the merger. On June 28, 1988, the Statesman Journal stated that the final vote count for the May 1987 referendum was 7–4. According to a May 1987 The Astorian article, at the time there were 33 registered voters; the article stated five voted in favor to close, three voted against it, and the remainder did not vote. At the time of the vote, there were three Lawen area students attending the Crane School and one attending a school in Burns (then in the Burns Elementary School District). On May 31, 1988, seven voters voted in favor to consolidate Lawen into Crane, and four voted against. In 1988 the Lawen district merged into the Crane district.
