= Narrows, Oregon =

Unincorporated community in the state of Oregon, United States

- Unincorporated community
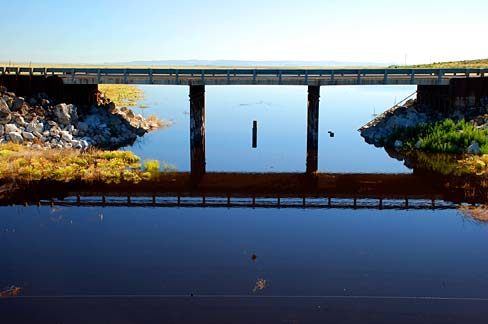
- The Narrows channel and bridge

- Location within Oregon Location within the United States
- Coordinates: 43°16′45″N 118°57′44″W
- Country: United States
- State: Oregon
- County: Harney
- Elevation: 4,111 ft (1,253 m)
- Time zone: UTC-8 (Pacific (PST))
  - Summer (DST): UTC-7 (PDT)
- ZIP code: 97721
- Area codes: 458 and 541
- GNIS feature ID: 1132010

Narrows, or The Narrows, is an unincorporated community in Harney County, Oregon, United States. It was started as a community in 1889 by Lewis B. Springer and Albert Hembree. A post office was established in August 1889 and Springer, the postmaster, named it after himself. In April 1892 the name was changed to Narrows and Hembree became postmaster. The post office operated until 1936, and is now served by the New Princeton post office, zip code 97721.

== Climate ==
According to the Köppen Climate Classification system, Narrows has a semi-arid climate, abbreviated "BSk" on climate maps.

== Education ==
Narrows is in Harney County School District 4 (Crane School, grades K-8) and Harney County Union High School District 1J (Crane Union High School).
