= Lawen, Oregon =

Unincorporated community in the state of Oregon, United States

- Unincorporated community
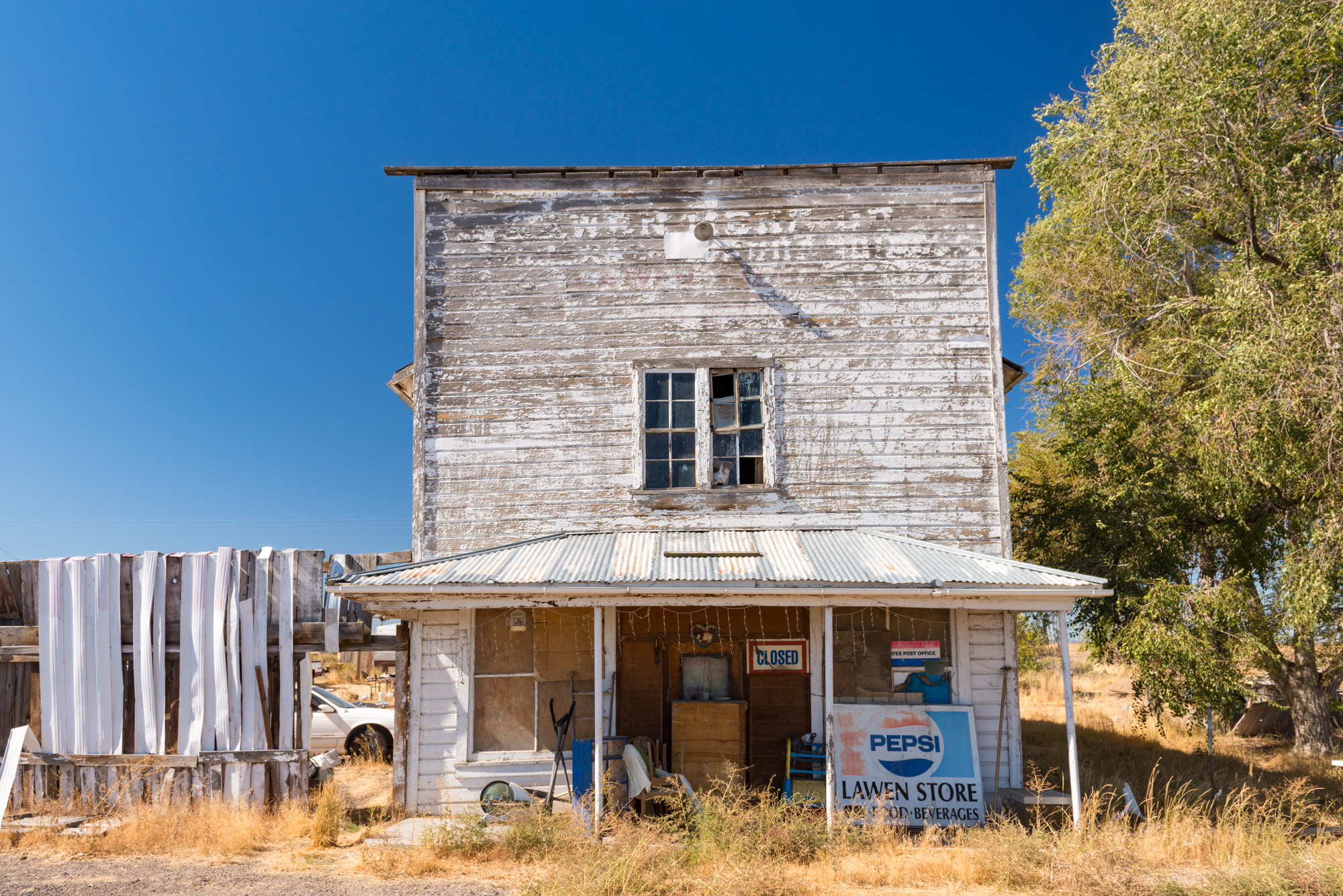
- The Old Lawen Store, Highway 78

- Location within Oregon Location within the United States
- Coordinates: 43°26′35″N 118°48′04″W
- Country: United States
- State: Oregon
- County: Harney
- Elevation: 4,108 ft (1,252 m)
- Time zone: UTC-8 (PST)
  - Summer (DST): UTC-7 (PDT)
- ZIP codes: 97720
- Area code: 541
- GNIS feature ID: 1136466

Lawen is an unincorporated community in Harney County, Oregon, United States. It has a post office with a ZIP code 97720. Lawen lies along Oregon Route 78 just south of its interchanges with Oregon Route 205, U.S. Route 20, and U.S. Route 395 in Burns, the county seat. Lawen is just north of the East Fork Silvies River and Malheur Lake.

In 2023, Taylor Perse of the Eugene Weekly described it as "a ghost town with a handful of rundown buildings."

== History ==
The namesake is Henry Lauen.

Flooding in 1984 affected the region.

== Climate ==
According to the Köppen Climate Classification system, Lawen has a semi-arid climate, abbreviated "BSk" on climate maps.

== Government and infrastructure ==
There was a Lawen Post Office that started in 1891. The Sunday Oregonian stated that the post office building "is thought to have been built about 1896". In 1920 The Times-Herald stated opposition to a plan to close the post office. The structure, in 1929, moved to the new location of the community from the old one. The building had two stories. In 1984 flooding occurred that threatened the post office. 1985 flooding also threatened the post office.

== Education ==
Lawen is in Harney County School District 4 (Crane School, grades K-8) and Harney County Union High School District 1J (Crane Union High School). Crane Union opened in 1918 in Lawen and moved to Crane in 1920.

Harney County is not in a community college district but has a "contract out of district" (COD) with Treasure Valley Community College. TVCC operates the Burns Outreach Center in Burns.

The community was formerly in the Lawen Elementary School District, which operated Lawen Elementary School. The Lawen school never reopened after a 1984 flooding, and the Lawen district merged into the Crane elementary district in 1988.
