= Crane Elementary School District =

Crane Elementary School District may refer to:

- Crane Elementary School District (Arizona)
- Harney County School District 4 (Crane Elementary School District) in Crane, Oregon

== See also ==
- Crane School (disambiguation)
