= Venator, Oregon =

Unincorporated community in the state of Oregon, United States

- Unincorporated community
- Location within Oregon Location within the United States
- Coordinates: 43°20′53″N 118°18′19″W
- Country: United States
- State: Oregon
- County: Harney
- Elevation: 3,767 ft (1,148 m)
- Time zone: UTC-8 (Pacific)
  - Summer (DST): UTC-7 (Pacific)
- Area code: 541
- GNIS feature ID: 1136866

Venator is an unincorporated community in Harney County, Oregon, United States. It is on Crane–Venator Road about 17 miles (27 km) southeast of Crane, near the South Fork Malheur River.

Alphena Venator, a native of Linn County, settled in Harney County as a youth in 1872. Alphena's father Jezreel is the namesake for Venator Canyon in Harney and Malheur counties. When Alphena established a livestock ranch in the area in 1884, the locale soon became known as "Venator". Venator post office was established in 1895, with Louella Venator as the first postmaster. The office was later moved two and a half miles north to a station on the now-abandoned Oregon Eastern Branch (or Burns Branch) of the Union Pacific railroad. As of 1976, there were only six buildings and a corral at the site, although at one time there was a Civilian Conservation Corps (CCC) camp in the area.

== Education ==
Venator is in Harney County School District 4 (Crane School, grades K-8) and Harney County Union High School District 1J (Crane Union High School).

There was previously a Venator School District 16.
