= Hawksy Walksy =

Plain in Harney County, Oregon, US

Coordinates: 41°59′43″N 119°9′28″W

Hawksy Walksy, also spelled Hawksie Walksie, is a lake basin located in Harney County, Oregon, United States. Its elevation above sea level is 1715 meters. It is bordered by Hawk Mountain to the north and Lone Juniper Mountain to the northeast.

Hawksie-Walksie Research Natural Area is a region of sagebrush and mixed grass species between Hawk Mountain and Acty Mountain, owned by the Bureau of Land Management.
