= Buchanan, Oregon =

Unincorporated community in the state of Oregon, United States

- Unincorporated community
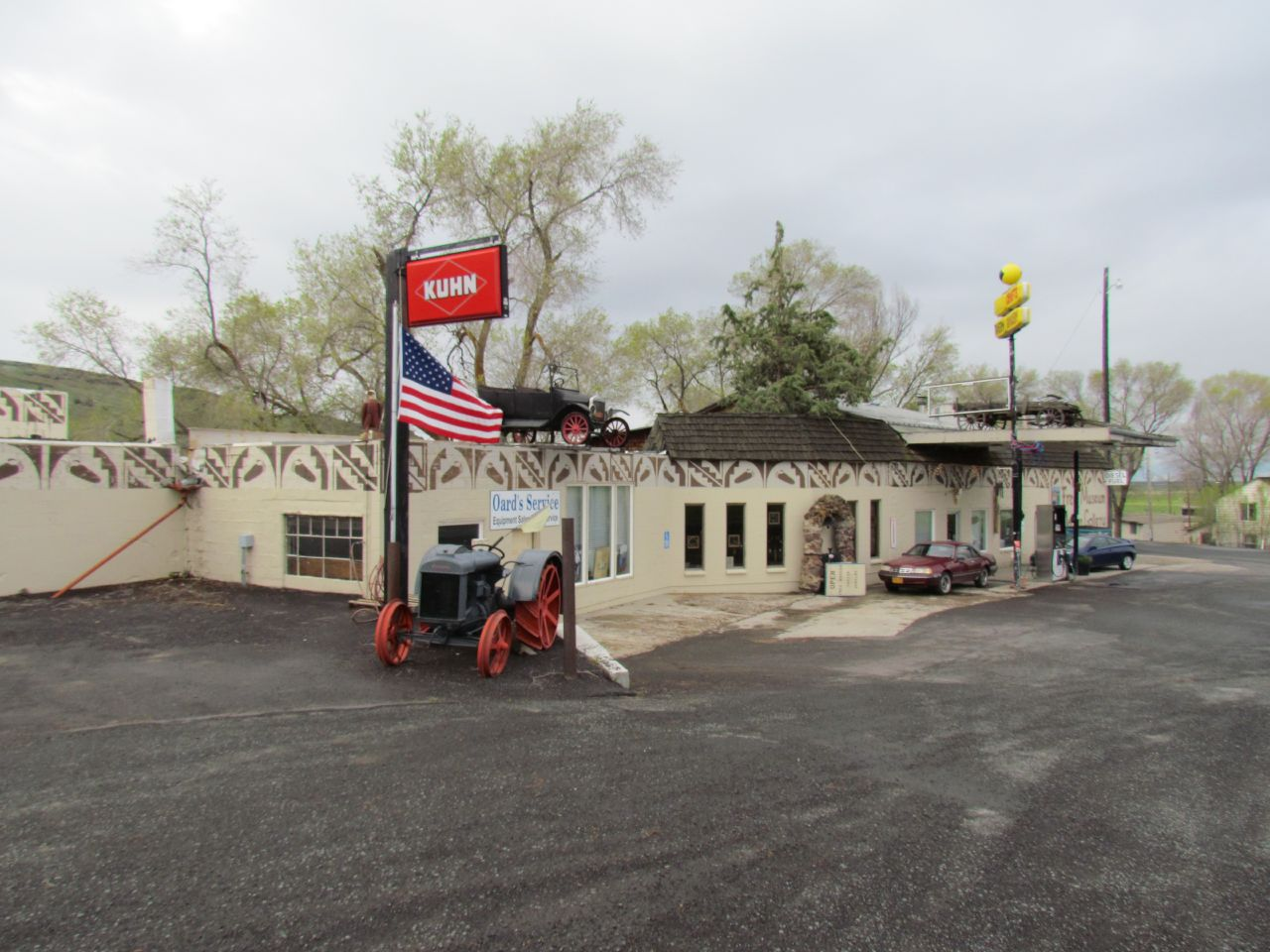
- Oard's Service in Buchanan

- Location within Oregon Location within the United States
- Coordinates: 43°38′33″N 118°37′43″W
- Country: United States
- State: Oregon
- County: Harney
- Named for: William D. Buchanan family
- Elevation: 4,213 ft (1,284 m)
- Time zone: UTC-8 (PST)
  - Summer (DST): UTC-7 (PDT)
- Area code: 541
- GNIS feature ID: 1138734

Buchanan is an unincorporated community in Harney County, Oregon, United States. It is approximately 20 miles (32 km) east of Burns on U.S. Route 20.

== History ==
The community was named after the family of William D. Buchanan, who, with his sons Joe and George, homesteaded there beginning in 1886. Buchanan post office was established in 1911, with Hattie E. Buchanan the first postmaster. The office closed in 1919 but the area around the Buchanan Ranch is still known as Buchanan. By 1978 the community had a single store. Today Buchanan has a Burns mailing address and a business that includes a tractor repair shop, gas station, gallery, and free museum, all located within the only building in the community.

The school once stood along Little Rock Creek on the site of the present-day Buchanan Springs Rest Area on U.S. 20, a mile northeast of the community.

William Buchanan and his sons ran a stage stop at the top of the hill, north of the present-day Buchanan, on the former J. W. Buchanan ranch. The stop served the route from Vale to Burns. Meals for stagecoach passengers were 50 cents, while those traveling with horses only paid 35 cents, but they paid 25 cents per head for feed and water for their livestock. The stop was later run by Thomas Buchanan.

== Transportation ==
In the 21st century, Buchanan is a stop on the Eastern POINT intercity bus line between Bend and Ontario. It makes one stop per day in each direction.

== Education ==
Buchanan is in Harney County School District 4 (Crane School, grades K-8) and Harney County Union High School District 1J (Crane Union High School).
