= Crane School =

Crane School may refer to:

- Crane Country Day School, K-8 private school in Santa Barbara, CA, USA
- Crane Elementary School, a K-8 public school operated by Harney County School District 4, in Crane, OR, USA
- Crane School of Music, music school in Potsdam, NY, USA
- Crane Theological School at Tufts University, USA, 1869-1968

== See also ==
- Crane High School (disambiguation)
- Crane School District (disambiguation)
