= Van, Oregon =

Unincorporated community in the state of Oregon, United States

- Unincorporated community
- Location within Oregon Location within the United States
- Coordinates: 43°59′24″N 118°41′18″W
- Country: United States
- State: Oregon
- County: Harney
- Elevation: 4,124 ft (1,257 m)
- Time zone: UTC-8 (PST)
  - Summer (DST): UTC-7 (PDT)
- Area code: 541
- GNIS feature ID: 1151720

Van is an unincorporated community in Harney County, Oregon, United States. It is along Van–Drewsey Road about 50 miles (80 km) northeast of Burns, in the Wolf Creek Valley.

Van post office was established in 1891 and named for local settler Van Middlesworth. The office closed in 1953. As of 2008, the former United States Forest Service Van Guard Station was for sale.

== Climate ==
According to the Köppen Climate Classification system, Van has a semi-arid climate, abbreviated "BSk" on climate maps.

== Education ==
Van is in Pine Creek School District 5 (Pine Creek School, grades K-8) and Harney County Union High School District 1J (Crane Union High School).
