= Venator =

Venator may refer to:

- Venator (gladiator type), a type of Roman gladiator
- Venator (spider), a genus of spiders
- The Latinized surname of Niccolò Cacciatore (lat. Nicolaus Venator), 19th century astronomer
- Venator Group, the corporate successor to F.W. Woolworth's, Inc., now known as Foot Locker, Inc., a retail store
- Venator Materials, spin-off of the Pigments and Additives division of the Huntsman Corporation
- Venator, Oregon, a community in Harney County, Oregon, United States
- Venator class Star Destroyer, a class of spacecraft in Star Wars

== See also ==
- List of commonly used taxonomic affixes, for the suffix "-venator", as used in taxonomy
