= Andrews, Oregon =

- Ghost town
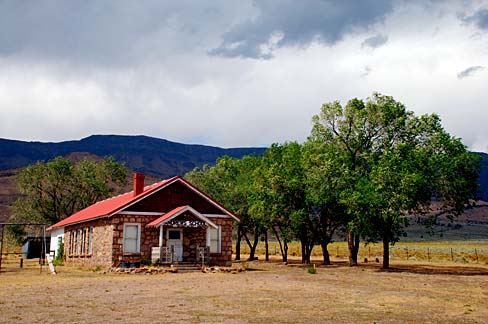
- Andrews community school in 2007

- Location within Oregon Location within the United States
- Coordinates: 42°27′51″N 118°36′48″W
- Country: United States
- State: Oregon
- County: Harney
- Elevation: 4,157 ft (1,267 m)

Population (1996)
  - Total: 0
- Time zone: Pacific

Andrews is a ghost town in Harney County, Oregon, United States. It is located south of Steens Mountain and near the Alvord Desert.

== History ==
The community was named for Peter Andrews, who settled in the area about 1880. A post office was established on Andrews' property in 1890. The post office was moved north a short distance in 1900 and called "Wildhorse" or "Wild Horse". Locals referred to it as "Wild Hog", however, so the postmaster changed the name to honor his friend Andrews.

At its peak the community had about 150 residents. However, the population of Andrews slowly declined until only one house remained. When it burned down in 1996, the community became a ghost town.

In 2011, artist John Simpkins moved into the abandoned school at Andrews. He set up residence in the teacher's cottage and turned the schoolhouse into his studio. He spent nearly a decade living and working at the school until 2020 when the property owner ordered him to vacate the buildings.

== Climate ==
According to the Köppen Climate Classification system, Andrews has a semi-arid climate, abbreviated "BSk" on climate maps.

== Education ==
When Andrews was populated, high school-aged students attended Crane Union High School. There was formerly an Andrews School District No. 29, which operated Andrews Elementary School.

The Andrews townsite is in the South Harney School District 33 (for Fields School) and the Harney County Union High School District 1J (the school district for Crane Union).

== See also ==
- List of ghost towns in Oregon
