= South Fork Malheur River =

- Location of the mouth of the South Fork Malheur River in Oregon
- Etymology: From the French malheur (bad fortune), applied by French Canadian hunters whose cache of furs near the river were stolen

Location
- Country: United States
- State: Oregon
- County: Harney, Malheur

Physical characteristics
- Source
  - location: Round Mountain, southeast of New Princeton, Harney County
  - coordinates: 43°13′40″N 118°24′24″W
  - elevation: 4,709 ft (1,435 m)
- Mouth: Malheur River
  - location: Riverside, Malheur County
  - coordinates: 43°33′23″N 118°10′00″W
  - elevation: 3,264 ft (995 m)

The South Fork Malheur River is a tributary of the Malheur River in a sparsely populated part of the U.S. state of Oregon. Arising southeast of the unincorporated community of New Princeton and slightly north of Oregon Route 78, it flows generally northeast to meet the Malheur near the unincorporated community of Riverside in Malheur County. The South Fork enters the larger river 96 miles (154 km) by water from its confluence with the Snake River.

== Tributaries ==
Named tributaries of the South Fork from source to mouth are Camp, Indian, Deadman, Pole, Crane, and Swamp creeks. Then Coleman, Coyote, Cobb, Visher, Buck, McEwen, Hot Springs, and Granite creeks.

== See also ==
- List of rivers of Oregon
