= Drewsey School District 13 =

School district in Oregon, United States

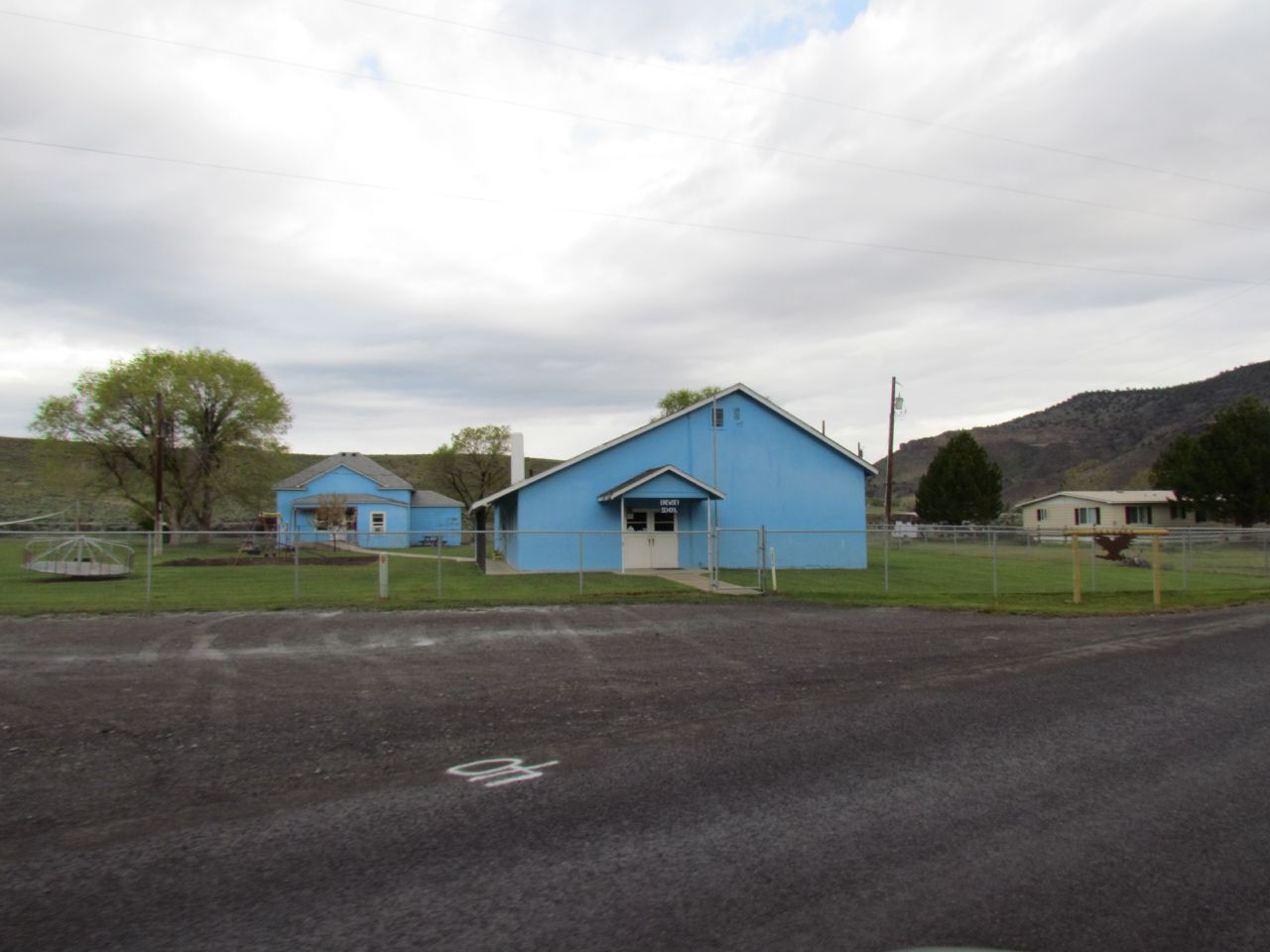
Drewsey Elementary School

Drewsey School District 13 is a school district headquartered in Drewsey, Oregon. The district is entirely in Harney County. It has a single K-8 school, Drewsey Elementary School.

The school, as of 1987, had an apartment building for its two teachers. Each teacher has multiple grade levels.

== History ==
In 1982, there was a recall election on removing three board members, but all three recall elections resulted in the board members keeping their positions.

== Food service ==
In 1985, the enrollment was 20. That year, Drewsey elementary used commodity foods as its main foodservice. The foods chosen by the school differed from foods served in urban areas at the time, as ranching communities in Oregon had emphasis on food like casseroles as well as roasted and stewed dishes. The school, prior to 1985 had made daily snacks, and in 1985 served desserts and used peanuts as an occasional snack.

== Sister school ==
In 1987 Drewsey School had a sister school relationship with Wilbur D. Rowe Junior High School (now Wilbur D. Rowe Middle School) in Milwaukie, Oregon, of the North Clackamas Schools school district. The sister school relationship was established because two teachers, one in each school, were sisters. The sisters wanted rural and urban students to understand one another, and sought approval from the respective boards of trustees.

== Feeder patterns ==
High school students are zoned to Crane Union High School, of Harney County Union High School District 1J. In 1967, there were some Drewsey area parents who preferred sending their children to Burns Union High School instead of Crane Union, and had favored for the HSD 1J to be merged into the Burns Union High School District. As of 1987, Drewsey-area students going to Burns High live in Burns during the school week.
