= South Harney School District 33 =

School district in Oregon, United States

South Harney School District 33 is a school district headquartered in Fields, Oregon. It operates one school, Fields Elementary School. It is entirely in Harney County, and it includes Fields, Andrews, and the area of Denio on the Oregon side.

The school was formerly in the "Fields Trout Creek School District".

The school is .25 miles (0.40 km) from the center of Fields. The building itself, as of 1987, had one classroom. As of 2008, the school had two teachers, with each taking some of the grades.

In 1974, the Fields School had 11 students. In 1987, it had 20 students. In 2008, enrollment was 16.

Harney County formerly had the Trout Creek School, which in 1969 had two students, making it the smallest school by enrollment in the state. It was previously a part of its own school district, Trout Creek School District No. 53. That year, Fields Elementary was in the Fields School District No. 33. In 1975 both schools were parts of the Fields Trout Creek School District 33.

== Operations ==
In 1972 the school board of Fields Elementary permitted students to do paid janitorial duties after a teacher, offered money by the board to do janitorial duties, instead suggested that the students do so instead. That year, 16 students were enrolled. Later the grade school in Juntura adopted the janitorial idea from Fields after the Fields teacher moved to Juntura in 1975. Due to the small size of Fields Elementary, the South Harney #33 board decided not to have a dedicated janitorial employee. The students use the money to pay for field trips.

== Transportation ==
As of 2008 there were students who lived 45 miles (72 km) to 50 miles (80 km) from the school. One ranch zoned to Fields Elementary had, in 1998, a just under two hour commute to school per way. In 1987, there was at least one student who commuted from a location 70 miles (110 km) away.

In 1987 the school used a van to transport students.

== Feeder patterns ==
The district feeds into Harney County Union High School District 1J (Crane Union High School).
