= Suntex, Oregon =

Unincorporated community in the state of Oregon, United States

- Unincorporated community
- Location within Oregon Location within the United States
- Coordinates: 43°35′27″N 119°37′49″W
- Country: United States
- State: Oregon
- County: Harney
- Elevation: 4,308 ft (1,313 m)
- Time zone: UTC-8 (PST)
  - Summer (DST): UTC-7 (PDT)
- Area code: 541
- GNIS feature ID: 1129842

Suntex is an unincorporated community in Harney County, in the U.S. state of Oregon. It was established with the placement of a post office in the valley of Silver Creek west of Burns and north of U.S. Route 20.

The Suntex post office was set up in 1916 and closed in 1949, after which Suntex mail was handled through the post office in Riley. W. F. Sturges, the first postmaster at Suntex, said that postal authorities had assigned the name "Suntex", which had no local significance, for reasons he was unaware of.

== Education ==
The zoned K-8 school is Suntex Elementary School, operated by the Suntex School District 10.

High school students are zoned to Crane Union High School, of Harney County Union High School District 1J.

The Suntex School started operations circa 1930. A previous campus opened circa 1950. In 1978, the campus only had elementary grades, and the district sent middle and high school students to Burns schools.

There was a 1970 referendum on whether the school would remain open. The school did so. There was a 1970 school merger proposal that was rejected by voters. This was a proposal to merge the Suntex and Double O districts along with the elementary school districts of Burns (Burns ESD) and Hines, as well as the Burns high school district. In the Suntex school district, 23 people voted no and 10 voted yes. A 1975 proposal to merge the same districts was turned down by voters. The Burns and Hines elementary districts and the Burns high school district ultimately combined into Harney County School District 3 in 1989. The previous campus was destroyed in a 1978 fire. A referendum on building a new school building passed with 33 in favor and 3 against, with $25,000 given by the bond.

Harney County is not in a community college district but has a "contract out of district" (COD) with Treasure Valley Community College. TVCC operates the Burns Outreach Center in Burns.
