= Crane School District =

Crane School District may refer to:

- Crane Elementary School District (Arizona)
- Crane Elementary School District in Crane, Oregon
- Crane Independent School District in Crane, Texas
