= Harney District Hospital =

Hospital in Burns, Oregon

Coordinates: 43°35′18″N 119°3′38″W

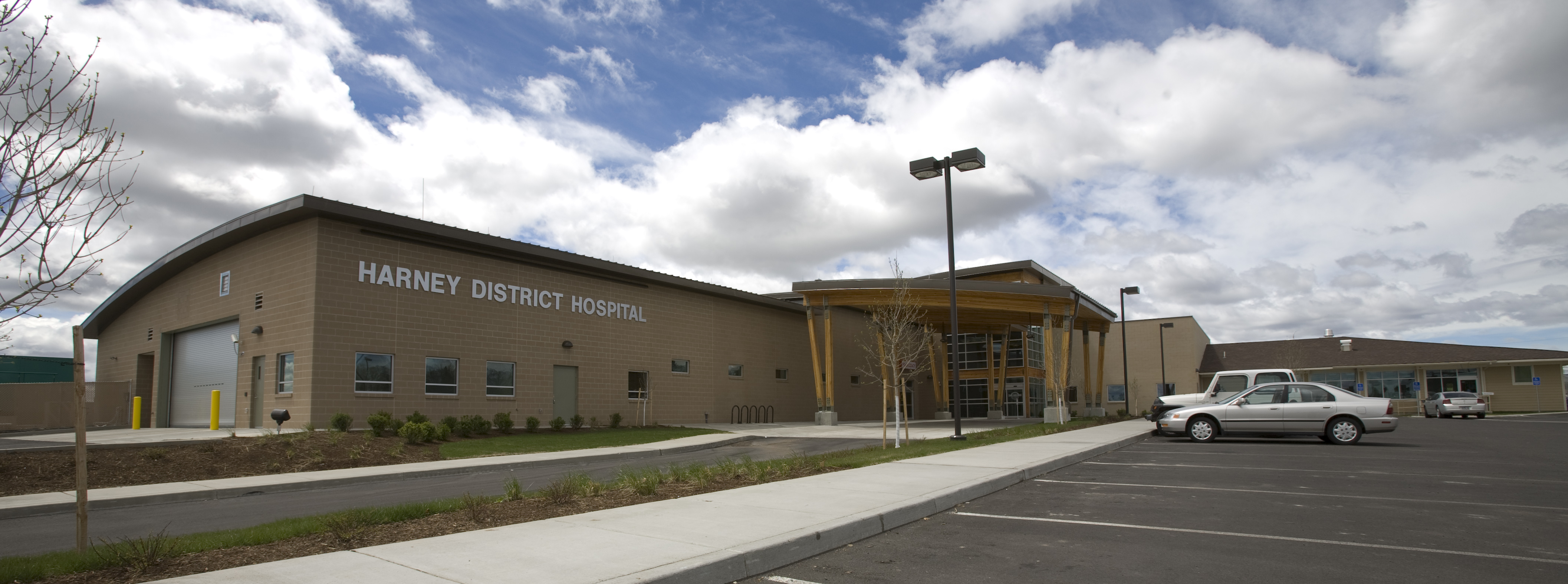
Harney District Hospital

Harney District Hospital is a public hospital in Burns, Oregon. It is operated by the Harney County Health District.

In 1989, Nellie Nix of The Bulletin described the hospital's catchment area as being Harney County.

== History ==
It opened as the Harney County Hospital, then controlled by the Harney County government, in 1950, replacing the Valley View Hospital. The construction cost was $322,000. Its initial capacity was 31 patients. The opening happened in May of that year. It was partially funded with a grant worth $106,687.

When it was county-run, the county judge (that is, the county executive) oversaw the hospital. In 1989 Dale White, who was county judge, stated that doing the two jobs required "more than the average number of hours in the day".

In 1990 the hospital had a capacity of 44, and it had 45 employees who worked for the hospital full time. Circa 1988 to 1990, five of the physicians in the county left, retired, and/or died, leaving just one. That year, there was a budget deficit in which the hospital was running out of money, but voters approved an emergency levy worth $175,000. There were at least 1,394 votes in favor, 478 votes against, and 10 votes that, as of Wednesday March 7, 1990, were not yet counted. The total sum of voters was about half of the voters in the county. If voters voted down this levy, the hospital would have possibly ceased operations. White stated that not having a hospital in Harney County could potentially cause fatal outcomes due to a general lack of proximity to healthcare facilities.

An April 1990 referendum on whether to create a new hospital district and give control of the hospital from the county government to the district succeeded. 1,367 voters approved, and 628 voted against it. There were a total of 3,767 registered voters at the time. Having a separate hospital district means a separate tax base and an administrator whose sole job is to operate the hospital.

In a period prior to 1990, the hospital had four nurses even though the workload would be ideal for having six nurses. By 1990 more nurses came to the area.

In 2005 the hospital had a traveling doctor and a mobile trailer to provide healthcare to the southern parts of Harney County and to Denio, Nevada. Matthew Preusch of the Associated Press wrote that the southern part of the county, with its long distances from healthcare facilities, had a "particularly acute" absence of such services.

The current facility was built in 2008.

== See also ==
- List of hospitals in Oregon
- List of public hospitals in the United States
