= Harney County School District 4 =

Harney County School District 4 is a school district headquartered in Crane, Oregon. It has one K-8 school, Crane Elementary School.

Located in Harney County, Oregon, the district includes Crane, Dunnean, Lawen, Narrows, New Princeton, Venator, and Voltage.

Both this district and the Harney County Union High School District 1J, which operates Crane Union High School, maintain separate boards of education. As of 2002, both districts hired the same person as superintendent and principal of both districts and both schools, respectively.

In 1967 the elementary school had about 40 students, and all lived within 30 miles (48 km) from the school. That year, Sidney Ratzlaff, who both served as principal of the schools and superintendent of the districts, stated that this radius was one that parents could reasonably go by car. As of 1967 the elementary district does not provide school buses for students. Instead, the State of Oregon compensates parents, who drive their own children. Additionally, unlike the high school, the elementary school does not have a boarding program.

== History ==
A 1967 fire caused an evacuation of Crane Elementary students, along with those of Crane Union, and destroyed the building that housed both schools. In 1985 Crane Elementary had a dedicated cafeteria, with staff, separate from that of the high school. In 1985 at least one student at least lived 43 miles (69 km) from the school. The school did not have dormitories available for the elementary students. After a 1984 flooding incident on the grounds of Lawen Elementary School, students from that school began attending Crane Elementary, initially on a temporary basis. Lawen school never re-opened. In 1987 voters approved a merger of the Lawen school district into the Crane elementary district, and the merger was effective in 1988.

== Feeder patterns ==
The district feeds into Harney County Union High School District 1J (Crane Union).
