= New Princeton, Oregon =

Unincorporated community in the state of Oregon, United States

- Unincorporated community
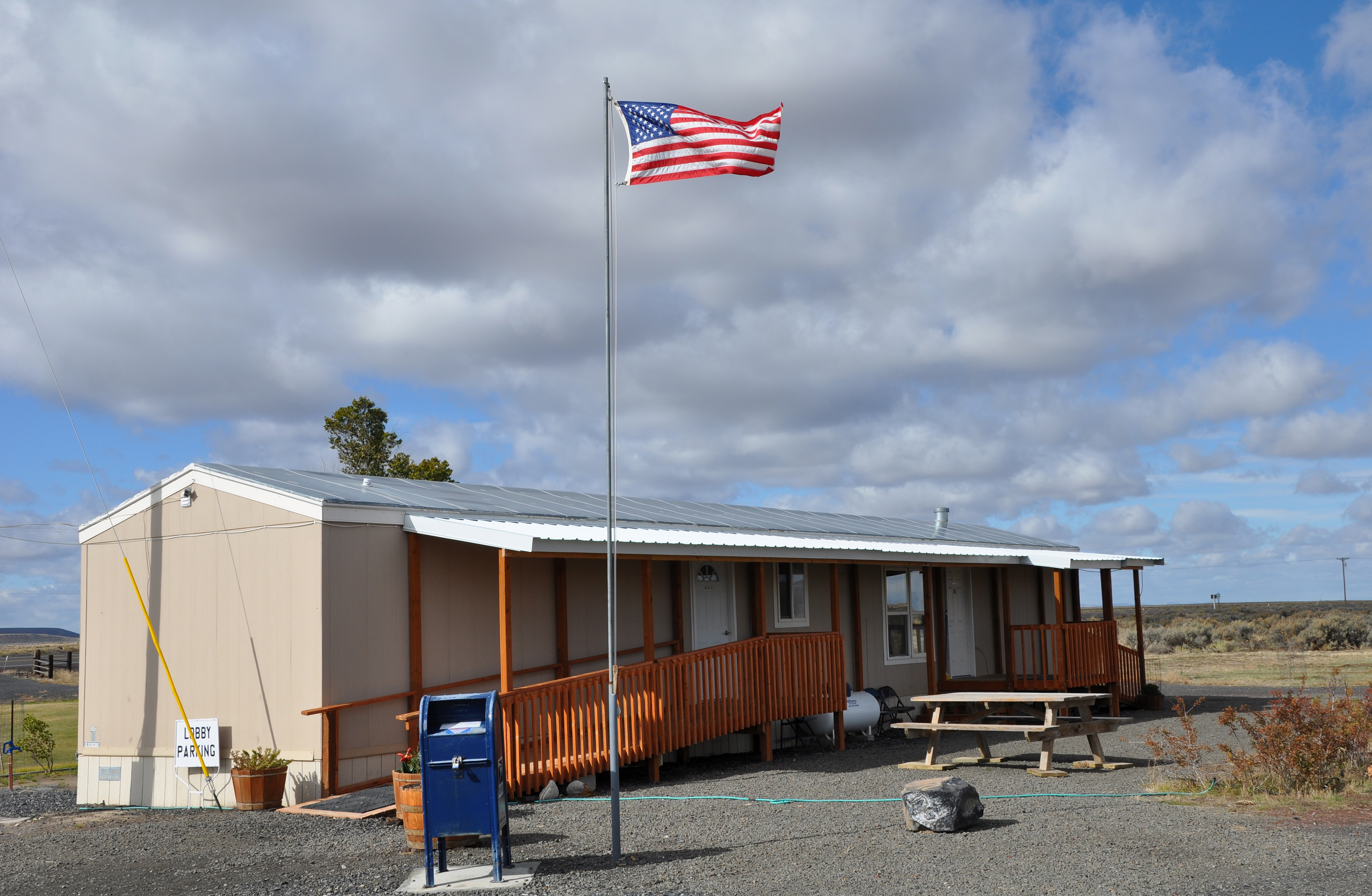
- New Princeton Post Office

- Location within Oregon Location within the United States
- Coordinates: 43°16′59″N 118°34′58″W
- Country: United States
- State: Oregon
- County: Harney
- Elevation: 4,108 ft (1,252 m)
- Time zone: UTC-8 (PST)
  - Summer (DST): UTC-7 (PDT)
- ZIP code: 97721
- Area codes: 458 and 541
- GNIS feature ID: 1136572

New Princeton is an unincorporated community in Harney County, in the U.S. state of Oregon. It is along Oregon Route 78 between Burns and Burns Junction at an elevation of 4,111 feet (1,253 m) above sea level. The South Fork Malheur River begins near Round Mountain, southeast of New Princeton.

The Princeton rural post office was established in 1910 or about 1912, depending on the source consulted. When an upgrade of Route 78 bypassed the original community, it was re-located to New Princeton.

== Climate ==
According to the Köppen Climate Classification system, New Princeton has a semi-arid climate, abbreviated "BSk" on climate maps.

== Education ==
New Princeton is in Harney County School District 4 (Crane School, grades K-8) and Harney County Union High School District 1J (Crane Union High School).

== Works cited ==
- McArthur, Lewis A., and McArthur, Lewis L. (2003) [1928]. Oregon Geographic Names, 7th ed. Portland: Oregon Historical Society Press. ISBN 0-87595-277-1.
