= Malheur National Wildlife Refuge =

Protected area in eastern Oregon, USA

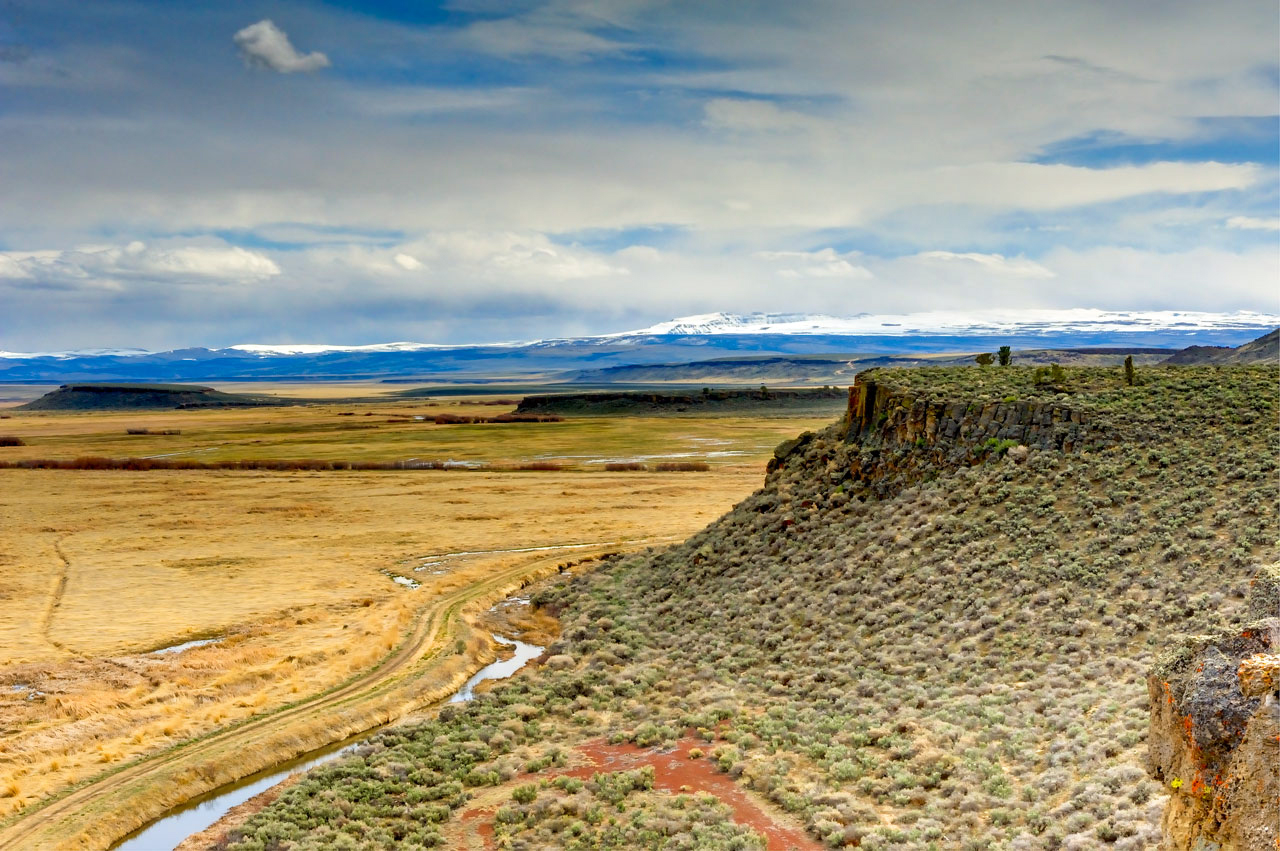
- A view of Steens Mountain from an overlook located in the Malheur National Wildlife Refuge

- Location within Oregon
- Location: 30 miles (48 km) south of Burns, Harney County, Oregon, United States
- Coordinates: 43°15′57″N 118°50′39″W
- Area: 293.37 sq mi (759.8 km^{2})
- Elevation: 4,121 ft (1,256 m)
- Established: 1908
- Website: Malheur NWR

Malheur National Wildlife Refuge is a National Wildlife Refuge located roughly 30 miles (48 km) south of the city of Burns in Oregon's Harney Basin. Administered by the United States Fish and Wildlife Service, the refuge area is roughly T-shaped with the southernmost base at Frenchglen, the northeast section at Malheur Lake and the northwest section at Harney Lake.

The refuge was created in 1908 by order of President Theodore Roosevelt to protect habitat for diverse waterfowl and migratory birds, and grew to encompass 187,757 acres (760 km^{2}; 293 sq mi) of public lands. A popular site for birding, fishing, hunting and hiking, the refuge gained widespread attention in early 2016 after its headquarters complex was occupied by armed anti-government protesters.

== History ==
Archaeological research within the Harney Basin region, including near Burns, Oregon, demonstrates that it likely was home to Native Americans for about the past 16,000 to 15,000 years. The first recognizable remains of seasonal prehistoric dwellings appear later in the Harney Basin at the Dunn Site about 5,500 BP. Around Malheur and Harney lakes, the presence of identifiable remains of numerous settlements and burials of the Boulder Village Period demonstrate that these lakes were heavily utilized by Paiute tribes for hunting and fishing as part of their seasonal nomadic round of the Harney Valley from before 3,000 BP up until historic contact with and settlement of the area by non-Native peoples. For example, the Malheur National Wildlife Refuge Headquarters lies within a major archaeological site that was once a settlement used by Paiute tribes seasonally for thousands of years until historic contact.

The arrival of settlers in the region led to restrictions on the use of the land by the Paiute people who were eventually restricted to living in the Malheur Indian Reservation. After it was established, the size of the Malheur Indian Reservation continued to shrink as small areas of it were repeatedly extracted from it and transferred to local settlers for their private use. The Paiute people were also denied the local fishing and hunting rights that were promised them.

The Paiute people were forced to leave their Malheur Indian Reservation after joining the Bannock people in Idaho in an uprising, the Bannock War, in 1878, and were resettled in Yakama Reservation, 350 miles (560 km) away in southeastern Washington. About 550 Paiute men, women, and children, of whom many had not engaged in any hostile action, traveled for nearly a month through the snow and over two mountain ranges. Even though supplies were in transit from the Malheur agency, the Paiute people were forced to leave Camp Harney under-equipped. As a result, five children, one woman, and an elderly man died along the way and were left unburied as they traveled. During the five years they spent on the Yakama Reservation, historian Sally Zanjani estimates that more than one-fifth of them died during their exile, mostly of malnourishment and disease. When they were allowed to leave the reservation in 1883, some of the Paiute people moved to either the Warm Springs Reservation or Nevada. Others returned to the Harney Basin and in 1972, acquired title to 771 acres (3.12 km^{2}) of land and created the Burns Paiute Indian Reservation.

After the removal of Paiute tribes, much of the region's land became public property. The region hosted large livestock operations while the area's water resources were altered by irrigation and drainage projects.

=== Devastation and study of bird life ===
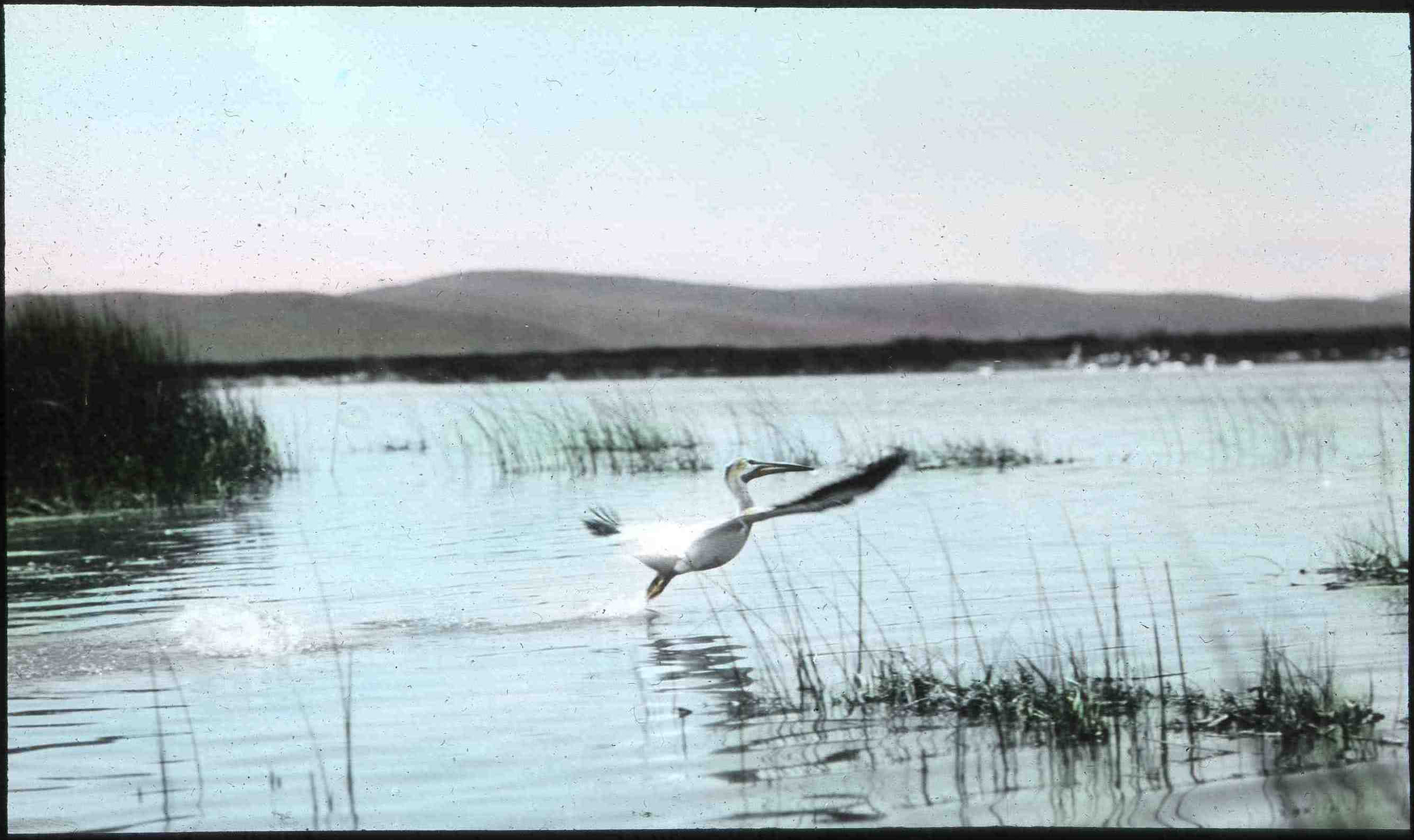
Hand-painted slide of an American white pelican taken at Malheur Lake in 1908.

The remarkable abundance and diversity of bird life within the pre-irrigation Malheur region was first described by Charles Bendire in the middle 1870s. Beginning in the late 1880s, the area's bird populations were devastated by the actions of plume hunters who harvested the showy feathers of Malheur's waterfowl for use as hat ornaments. In 1908, wildlife photographers William L. Finley and Herman Bohlman documented the area's unusual diversity of birds, as well as the detrimental impacts of plume hunting. Finley used photographs to personally lobby President Theodore Roosevelt for federal protection of the region.

=== Creation and expansion of the refuge ===
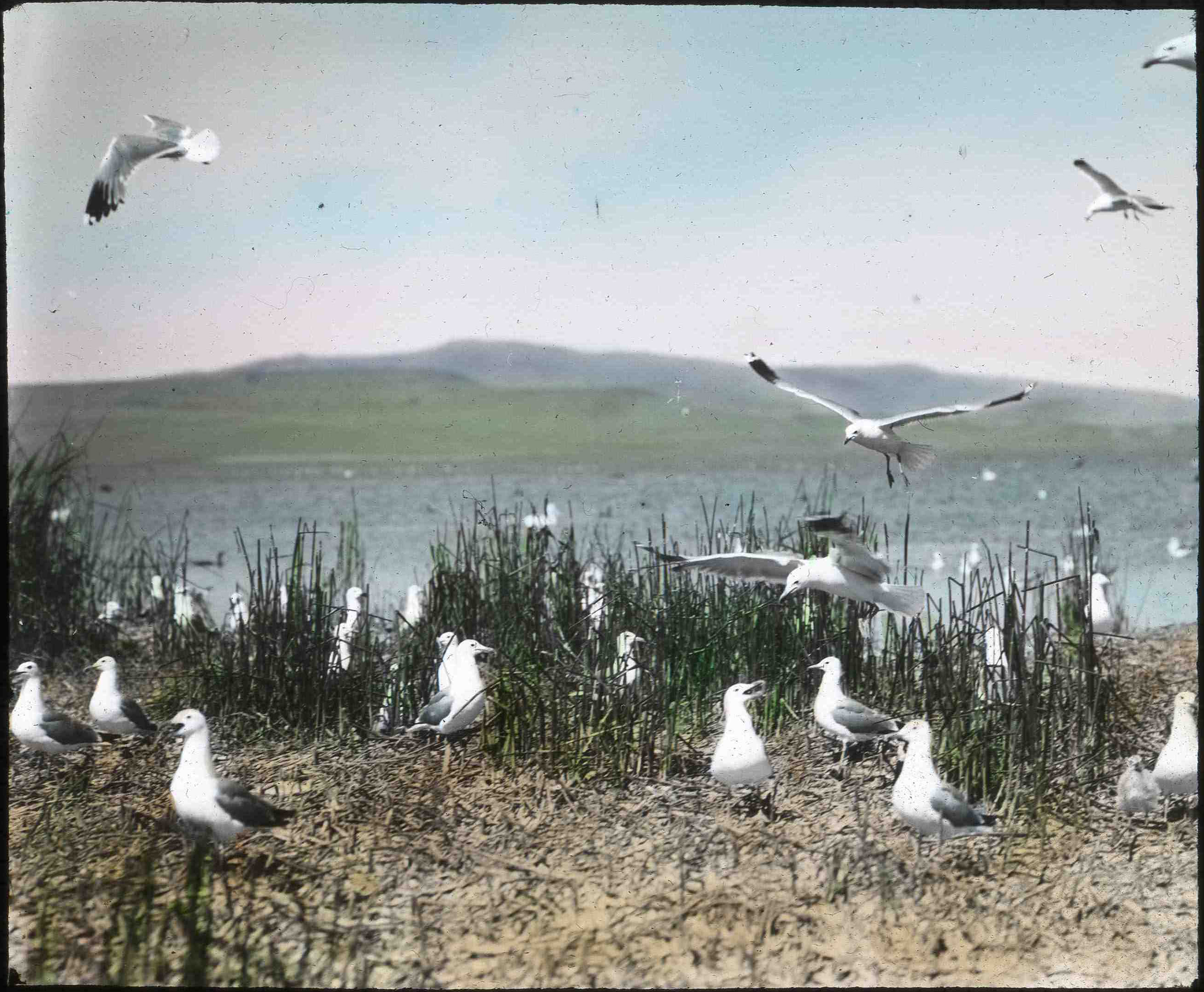
Hand-painted glass slide of a colony of California gulls at Malheur Lake, taken by Finley and Bohlman during a 1908 photograph trip to the area. Finley and Bohlman's photographs would later help Malheur become a bird refuge in 1908.

Malheur National Wildlife Refuge was created on August 18, 1908 by a proclamation from President Roosevelt, under a law which allowed the president to declare game preserves on federal public land. The refuge began as a 81,786-acre (330.98 km^{2}) parcel surrounding Malheur Lake, Harney Lake and Mud Lake, and was originally named the Malheur Lake Refuge. In the years that followed, the refuge grew to its current size of 187,756 acres (759.82 km^{2}) through federal purchases and acquisitions of surrounding lands. Of its current acreage, 43,665.57 acres (176.7083 km^{2}) were acquired by purchase from various willing sellers; 5,070.39 acres (20.5191 km^{2}) were acquired by condemnation; 64,713.54 acres (261.8864 km^{2}) were acquired by purchase from a willing seller as part of the Blitzen Valley Project in 1935; 12,287.73 acres (49.7267 km^{2}) were acquired in exchange for 11,442.76 acres (46.3072 km^{2}) of refuge land; 240 acres (0.97 km^{2}) were acquired by direct donation; and 73,222.07 acres (296.3192 km^{2}) were already existing public domain land. The creation and expansion of this refuge involved litigation, of which two lawsuits ended in favorable Supreme Court decisions, that provide the legal foundation for its ownership and management by federal agencies.

Roads and other infrastructure were built by workers with the Civilian Conservation Corps during the Great Depression. While cattle grazing was permitted on some portions of the property after 1935, the prioritization of the needs of the refuge's wildlife led to reductions in the number of cattle allowed on the property starting in the 1970s. The number of cattle allowed to graze within the refuge remained at a steady level throughout the 1990s and 2000s. As the need for a comprehensive management plan for the refuge was realized, ranch operators became concerned about the possibility of further reductions in grazing allotments.

=== Recent history ===
Drafting of a new management plan began in 2008, and was a collaborative process involving varied stakeholders in the refuge's future, including ranch operators. The final plan, completed in 2013 and intended to inform refuge operations for the following 15 years, was accepted by environmentalists, refuge managers, cattle owners and the Paiute tribe as an agreeable compromise between potentially opposing interests in the land. Grazing was allowed to continue under the innovative plan, and is seen as a valuable tool in some areas to combat invasive plants that threaten the refuge's habitat quality; however, the extent of grazing may be reduced in specific areas if it is scientifically shown to be detrimental to the refuge's wildlife.

==== 2016 occupation ====
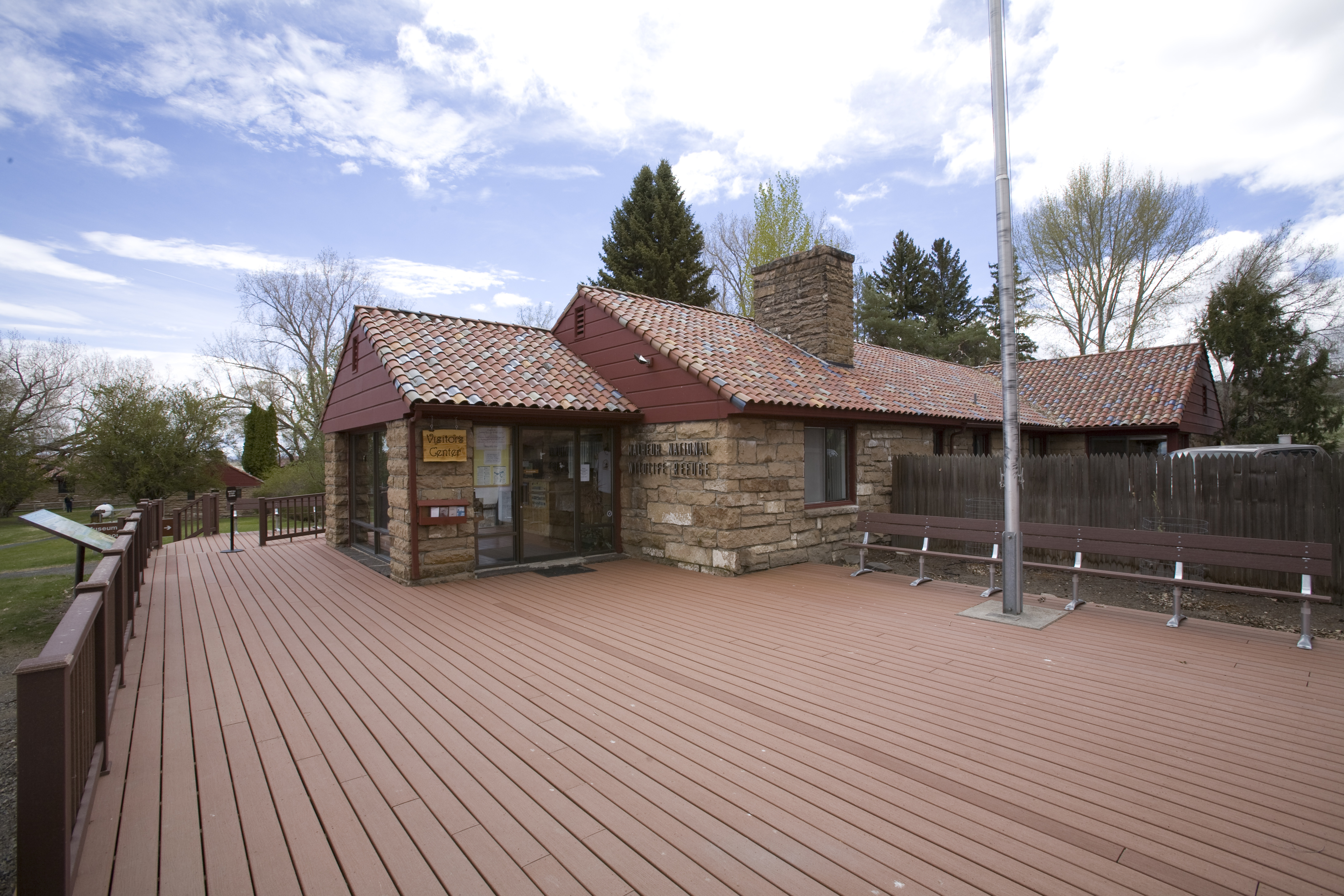
The Malheur National Wildlife Refuge headquarters were seized by armed protesters in January 2016.

From January 2 to February 11, 2016, the refuge's headquarters was seized by armed protesters related to the 2014 Bundy standoff. For most of the occupation, law enforcement allowed the occupiers to come and go at will. At the conclusion, most of the leaders were arrested, and one was killed while traveling away from the refuge when the group he was leading attempted to evade a police road block. The remaining occupiers either departed or surrendered peacefully.

With respect to the refuge, they demanded that the federal government relinquish control so that, according to the occupiers, "the people can have their resources".

Various stakeholders interested in the protection of the refuge, including the Portland Audubon Society and the Burns Paiute Tribe, voiced unease about potential impacts of an extended occupation. Among their concerns were the delayed implementation of work to improve conditions for the annual spring migration of birds, halting of efforts to control invasive common carp, and protection of archaeological sites within the refuge. Concerns were also raised regarding the occupiers' handling of Burns Paiute artifacts stored at the refuge's headquarters, as well as direct impacts to the refuge and damage to an important archaeological site caused by road construction, destruction of fencing, and damage to a research field station.

== Geography ==
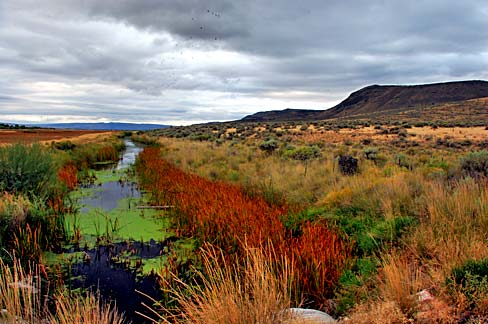
Malheur National Wildlife Refuge waterway at Krumbo Reservoir Road

The Donner und Blitzen River flows northward through the middle of the refuge, and is irrigated out to create a large artificial wetland, where once a natural wetland stood. The Donner und Blitzen River flows into Malheur Lake, which flows into Harney Lake forming a large salt lake. This open water brings thousands of migrating birds through the wildlife refuge every year as has happened for thousands of years before in the past.

Including the extensive marshland, the total size of the refuge is 187,757 acres (759.83 km^{2}). Exceptionally hot in the summer, and cold in the winter, the late spring and early fall are popular times to visit. Malheur National Wildlife Refuge is home to one of the most extensive freshwater marsh ecosystems in the western United States. These marshes lie in the desiccated lake bed of a Pleistocene age pluvial lake.

Located along the southeast side of the Malheur National Wildlife Refuge is the Diamond Craters volcanic field. It lies about 40 miles (64 km) southeast of the city of Burns. This monogenetic volcanic field consists of a 27 sq mi (70 km^{2}) area of basaltic lava flows, cinder cones, and maars. A reexamination of old radiocarbon dates and interpretation of paleomagnetic data and new radiocarbon dates limits the eruption of volcanic vents in this volcanic field to the time period between 7320 and 7790 calendar years B.P.

North of Diamond Craters, a late Pleistocene basaltic lava flow, called the Voltage Flow, forms a high-standing subdued ridge that marks the eastern boundary of the pluvial lake basin that is now occupied by Malheur, Mud, and Harney lakes. The Voltage Flow was erupted about 1.9 million years ago from several volcanic vents located north of Diamond Craters. At that time, the Voltage Flow created the pluvial lake basin that the Malheur National Wildlife Refuge currently occupies by filling the paleovalley of and damming the prehistoric course of Malheur River at that time.

== Wildlife ==
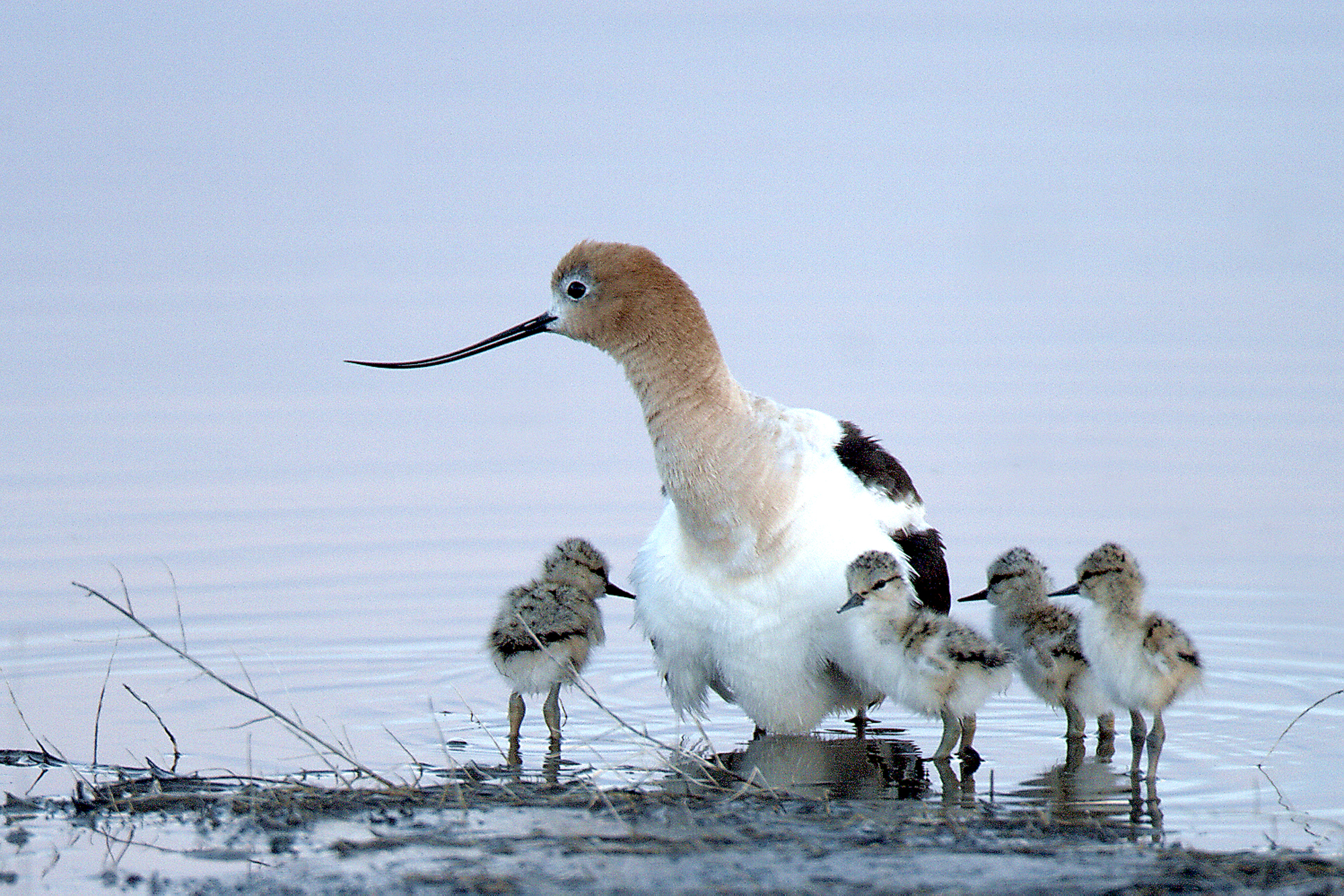
An adult American avocet with four chicks at Malheur National Wildlife Refuge in 2006.

Wildlife in the area includes as many as 320 species of birds and 58 species of mammals in desert, grassland, marsh and rimrock habitats. Malheur is one of the most productive waterfowl breeding areas in the United States and is an essential migration stop for hundreds of thousands of birds following the Pacific Flyway. Among the migrating birds that depend upon this refuge as a migration stop for rest and foraging are northern pintail and tundra swan, lesser and greater sandhill crane, snow goose and Ross’ goose. Ducks, grebes, pelicans and trumpeter swans are drawn to the numerous ponds, marshes and lakes. Deer, antelopes, ducks, pheasants, thrashers and quails can be found in the upland areas in sagebrush, greasewood and wild rye.

The lakes within the Malheur National Wildlife Refuge are important and irreplaceable foraging areas for migrating waterfowl, waterbirds, and shorebirds and nesting habitat for colonial nesting waterbirds and diving ducks. When sago pondweed is abundant in the lakes, it supports an abundance of canvasbacks, tundra swan, and many other dabbling and diving ducks in large numbers. When environmental conditions are favorable, very high numbers of nesting colonial birds, including white-faced ibis; American white pelican; great and snowy egrets; herons; Franklin's, California, and ring-billed gulls; Caspian and Forster's terns; and western, Clark's, and eared grebes, use the lake for nesting. Under favorable environmental conditions, the total number of nesting colonial waterbird nests have exceeded 10,000. When natural fluctuating water cycles expose mudflats within these lakes, migrant shorebirds use the lakes extensively. In addition, the expansive open water within Malheur Lake provides security for molting geese and ducks that exceeded 10,000 in number from predators. When Harney Lake is full, extensive beds of widgeongrass support well over 300,000 migrating ducks. Faunal remains found in local archaeological sites demonstrate that the lakes within the Malheur National Wildlife Refuge were just as important as foraging and nesting habitat for innumerable migrating and nesting birds for thousands of years into the prehistoric past as they are today. In addition to birds, these lakes once supported large numbers of muskrats, beaver, and mink.

Redband trout, which is a group of three recognized subspecies of rainbow trout (Oncorhynchus mykiss), are found in the tributaries and endorheic basins in the western United States. The Harney Basin, in which lie Malheur and Harney lakes, is the largest of these Oregon desert basins and contains the most diverse and greatest amount of redband trout habitat. This habitat includes Harney and Malheur lakes along with the Donner und Blitzen River, Silver Creek, and the Silvies River. Within the Harney Basin, the redband trout occur as ten distinct populations. One each occurs in Donner und Blitzen River, Silver Creek, and the Silvies River. Six of these redband trout populations exist as small communities in isolated creeks that dissipate onto the valley floor in the northeast and southeast regions of the basin. Finally, the tenth small population occupies McCoy Creek and have a one-way connection to the Donner und Blitzen River. Together with adjacent acreage owned by the Bureau of Land Management, Malheur National Wildlife Refuge in part provides critical protection to these redband trout populations. They are the survivors of the desiccation and disappearance of the last pluvial lake that filled the Harney Basin during the Last Glacial Maximum.

Refuge officials have been actively managing an overabundance of common carp (Cyprinus carpio) in the refuge since at least the 1970s. The invasive fish species was likely introduced to the refuge's waterways prior to the 1920s as a food source, and has been recognized as an ecological threat to the region since the 1950s. Carp are aggressive feeders that have reduced food availability and diminished habitat quality for the bird species that utilize the refuge's marshes and lakes. In 2014, a $35,000 contract to capture and remove carp was awarded to a fishing crew that specializes in the removal of invasive fish species.

== Fossils ==
Fossilized bones have been found within and adjacent to Malheur National Wildlife Refuge. Within Malheur National Wildlife Refuge, paleontologists have found the fossil bones of an unidentified camel-like species in Pleistocene volcanic ash deposits. This fossil site has the potential of yielding additional fossil animals and plants. Such fossils are of a regional importance as fossils from this geologic time period have not been found elsewhere in eastern Oregon. In addition, unnamed Neogene volcaniclastic and sedimentary strata have also yielded vertebrate fossils. They were collected from these strata in areas south of Harney Lake. These fossils bones indicate that the strata in which they occur date to both the Barstovian (Middle Miocene) and Clarendonian (Lower Miocene) stages. Finally, Late Pleistocene, 22,000 year-old, fossil salmon bones have been reported being found in prehistoric gravel spawning beds that were uncovered near the connection between Malheur and Mud lakes. These fossils have been interpreted as indicating that the lake level of this prehistoric pluvial lake was high enough at this time that it was connected to and discharged directly into the Malheur River.

== See also ==
- Malheur National Forest, located north of the refuge
- List of National Wildlife Refuges in Oregon
