= Burns Elementary School District =

School district in Oregon, United States

Burns Elementary School District was a school district headquartered in Burns, Oregon. It was also known as Harney County School District 1.

A 1975 proposal to merge the Burns elementary, Hines, Suntex, and Double O districts was turned down by voters.

In 1986 the district had 650 students in one junior high school and three elementary schools. They were Filmore Primary School, Washington Primary School, Henry L. Slater Elementary School, and the junior high school. The Slater Elementary Cafeteria, as of 1985, had the only cafeteria in the school district. The junior high school students traveled on foot to this cafeteria, while school buses were used to transport the primary school students to Slater.

In 1989 it merged into the Harney County School District 3.

== Schools ==
- Lincoln Junior High School: It received that name circa 1965.
- Slater Elementary School: Its namesake is a former principal. Built in 1948, it was at first known as Burns Grade School, but received its current name in 1971, the year the namesake retired.
