= Malheur Lake =

Lake in Harney County, Oregon

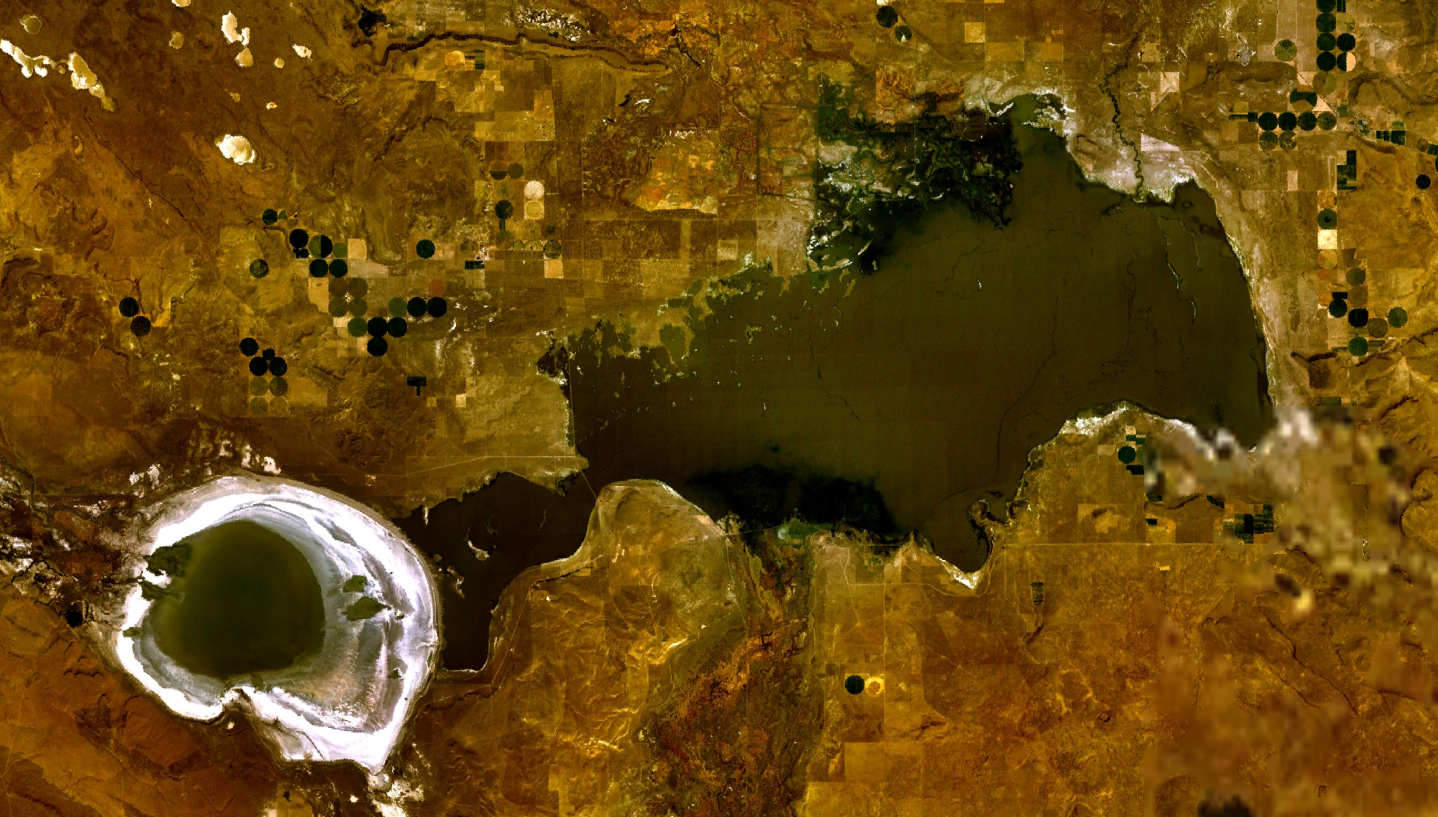
- Satellite image of Malheur Lake (right) and Harney Lake (left) in 2004

- Location of Malheur Lake in Oregon
- Location: Harney County, Oregon
- Coordinates: 43°19′58″N 118°47′35″W
- Type: Natural, eutrophic in an endorheic basin
- Primary inflows: Donner und Blitzen River, Silvies River, Sodhouse Spring, precipitation
- Primary outflows: Mud Lake (frequent but intermittent flows)
- Catchment area: 3,083 mi^{2} (7,980 km^{2})
- Basin countries: United States
- Surface area: 49,700 acres (20,100 ha)
- Average depth: 2 ft (0.61 m)
- Max. depth: 5 ft (1.5 m)
- Water volume: .. 84,500 acre⋅ft (104,200,000 m^{3})
- Residence time: 7.4 years
- Shore length^{1}: 58 mi (93 km)
- Surface elevation: 4,093 ft (1,248 m)
- Islands: Cole, Pelican
- Settlements: Burns, Crane, New Princeton
- ^{1} Shore length is not a well-defined measure.

Malheur Lake (/ˈmælhjʊər/ MAL-hure) is one of the lakes in the Malheur National Wildlife Refuge in Harney County in the U.S. state of Oregon. Located about 18 miles (29 km) southeast of Burns, the lake is marsh fed by the Donner und Blitzen River from the south and the Silvies River from the north. Malheur Lake periodically overflows into Mud Lake to the west and thence to Harney Lake, the sink of Harney Basin.

The western area of Malheur Lake consists of ponds separated by small islands and peninsulas. The lake's central and eastern sections are more open. The generally shallow water is suitable habitat for migratory birds, waterfowl, and aquatic plants.

As is typical of Great Basin lakes, Malheur Lake's surface area changes dramatically with the local weather, climate, and season because the lake is in a very flat basin. A large influence on the water volume is local snow melt, especially from Steens Mountain, south of the lake. For example, large snowpacks in the mid-1980s caused the lake to expand from approximately 67 to 160 square miles (170 to 410 km^{2}) within three years, flooding usually dry areas and damaging a branch of the Oregon Eastern Railway. Soon afterward, drought in the early 1990s reduced the lake size to just 200 acres (0.31 sq mi), exposing large mudflats and dusty playas.

== Geology ==
Malheur Lake is a remnant of a much larger Pleistocene lake that drained east to the Malheur River, a tributary of the Snake River. The size of this ancient lake, which existed during a wetter climate, has been estimated at 900 square miles (2,300 km^{2}), with a maximum depth of 35 feet (11 m). Its outlet was originally a channel near New Princeton, but lava flows diverted the water to a gap near Crane. Much of the original lake bottom has since turned into desert or become meadows periodically watered by lake overflows. Mud Lake and Harney Lake are also remnants of the original pluvial lake.

The lakes as well as nearby marshes and playas are part of Harney Basin. The basin, a closed depression, covers 5,300 square miles (14,000 km^{2}), which makes it larger than the state of Connecticut.

== Ecology ==
Malheur Lake contains many aquatic plants and grasses and is an important nesting and feeding area for waterfowl, migratory birds, and many other bird species. Wildlife includes ducks, geese, swans, herons, egrets, gulls, terns, and grebes.

=== Malheur Lake Basin redband trout ===
The Great Basin redband trout (Oncorhynchus mykiss newberri) has reduced access to Malheur and Harney lakes due to irrigation diversions, channelization, draining of marshlands, and high alkalinities. An exotic carp population is present in Malheur Lake and has caused extreme habitat damage. Harney Lake has been inhospitable to redband trout for many years due to high alkalinities. Today, redband trout in the Malheur Lake basin are widely distributed in small- and medium-size streams.

The redband trout is a unique subspecies adapted to the Malheur Lake basin ecosystem. In these closed, high-desert basins, redband trout have evolved to survive in environments with vast extremes of both water flow and temperature. They are one of only eight desert-basin populations of interior native redband trout. The Malheur Lake redband comprises 10 population groups in the closed interior basin of Harney and Malheur lakes. Historically, all streams were interconnected, and these fish moved through all the lakes and streams.

While not an officially designated threatened or endangered species, the redband trout is recognized as important resource, and the Steens Mountain Cooperative Management and Protection Act of 2000 (Public Law 106-399) sets aside land in Oregon for protection and research of redband trout.

== See also ==
- List of lakes in Oregon
- Malheur Cave
