= Crane, Oregon =

Unincorporated town in the state of Oregon, United States

- Census-designated place
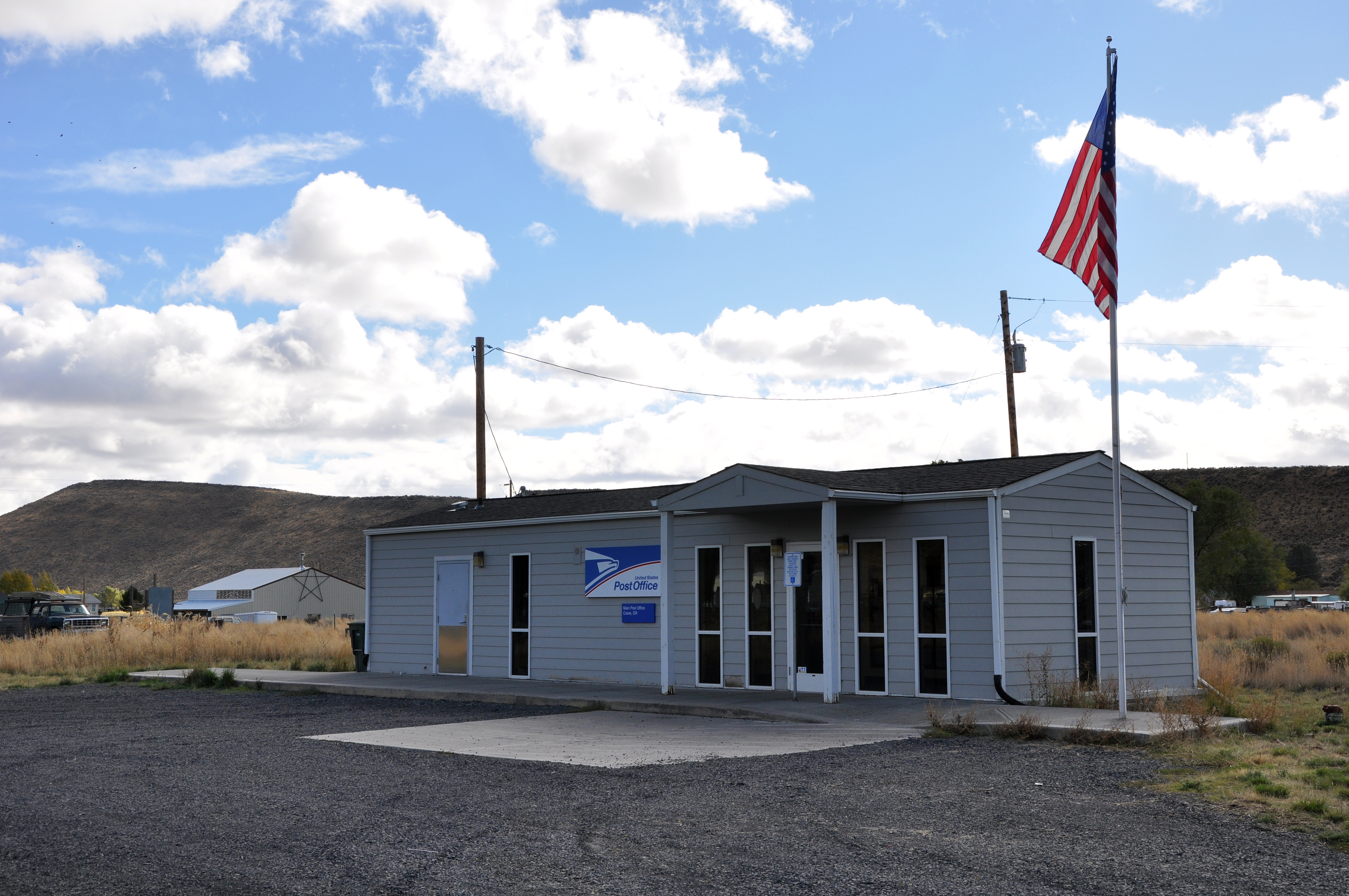
- Crane Post Office

- Location within Oregon Location within the United States
- Coordinates: 43°25′12″N 118°36′25″W
- Country: United States
- State: Oregon
- County: Harney

Area
  - Total: 10.42 sq mi (26.98 km^{2})
  - Land: 10.42 sq mi (26.98 km^{2})
  - Water: 0 sq mi (0.00 km^{2})
- Elevation: 4,131 ft (1,259 m)

Population (2020)
  - Total: 116
  - Density: 11/sq mi (4.3/km^{2})
- Time zone: UTC-8 (PST)
  - Summer (DST): UTC-7 (PDT)
- ZIP code: 97732
- Area code: 541
- FIPS code: 41-16450
- GNIS feature ID: 2611725

Crane is an unincorporated town and census designated place in Harney County, Oregon, United States, northeast of Malheur Lake on Oregon Route 78. Its population was 116 at the 2020 census.

The community is the location of Crane Union High School.

== History ==
Crane was named for the prominent local features Crane Creek and Crane Creek Gap. Crane Creek Gap is the pass between the Harney Basin and the drainage basin of the South Fork Malheur River. Crane Creek is probably named for the sandhill crane, which was once abundant in eastern Oregon. Crane post office was established in 1895 and discontinued in 1903. When the Union Pacific Railroad was completed from Ontario, Oregon, in 1916, the post office was reopened.

Until the railroad was finished to Burns in 1924, Crane was an important livestock shipping point, and the town was thriving with its five restaurants, four hotels, three garages, two general merchandise stores, a warehouse, a lumber yard, livery stables, a dance hall, a newspaper, a bank and a movie theater. In the period 1927-1931, about 300 people lived in Crane.

After a series of fires, the latest in 1938, however, the town never returned to its former prosperity. As of 2011, the businesses in Crane included a post office, a gas station, which is combined with a café and tavern, a farm supply store, and a local realtor.

Taylor Perse of Eugene Weekly stated that the community effectively reoriented itself around Crane Union High School. The Associated Press wrote that the school became "Crane's sole reason for being".

== Geography ==
Crane is in eastern Harney County along Oregon Route 78 (Steens Highway), which leads northwest 29 miles (47 km) to Burns, the county seat, and southeast 64 miles (103 km) to U.S. Route 95 at Burns Junction.

According to the U.S. Census Bureau, the Crane CDP has an area of 10.4 square miles (27.0 km^{2}), all of it land. It is 6 miles (10 km) northeast of Malheur Lake and 26 miles (42 km) by road northeast of the main entrance to Malheur National Wildlife Refuge.

By 2001, the town had some residences, the school facility, a post office, and a combined gas station and store.

== Demographics ==
Historical population
Census	Pop.	Note	%±
2020	116		—
U.S. Decennial Census

As of the 2020 census, there were 116 people, 65 housing units, and 52 families. There were 110 White people, 1 person from some other race, and 5 people from two or more races. 4 people were Hispanic or Latino.

The ancestry was 35.1% Irish, 27.7% German, 24.5% English, 21.3% Scottish, and 2.1% French.

The median age was 56.5 years old. 22.3% of the population were older than 65, with 14.9% between the ages of 65 and 74, and 7.4% older than 85.

The median household income was $31,389. 24.5% of the population were in poverty.

== Economy ==
As of 1989 residents typically did grocery shopping in Burns. The convenience store in Crane had some items, but not as wide of a selection compared to a supermarket.

== Education ==
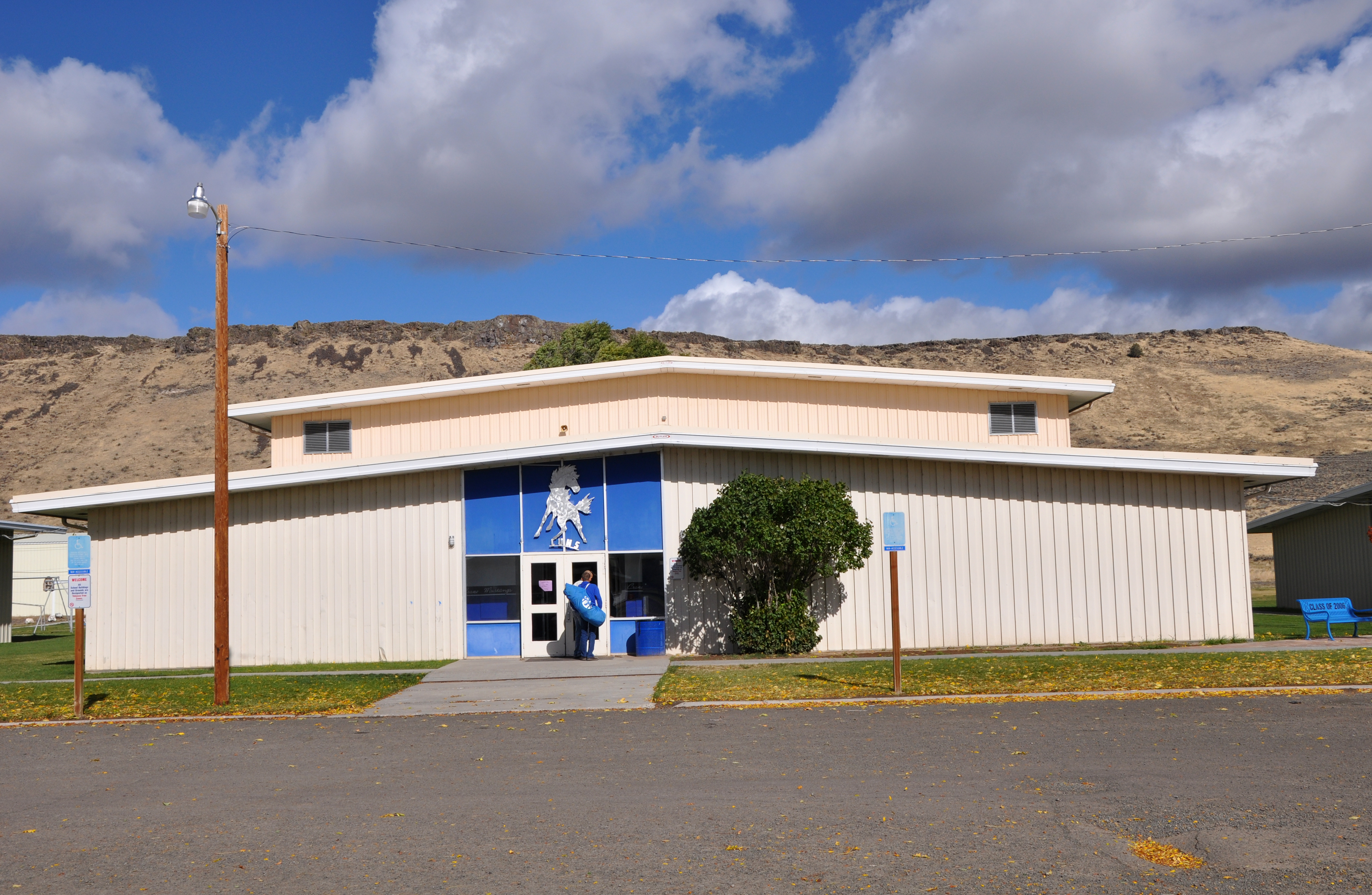
Crane Union High School

Crane Union High School and Crane Elementary School are in Crane. The high school, which draws students from a large rural district, is a boarding school. The high school is of the Harney County Union High School District 1J, while the elementary school is of Harney County School District 4. Both school districts maintain separate boards of education. As of 2002, both districts hired the same person as superintendent and principal of both districts and both schools, respectively.

In 2025, Mitch Siegner, a man quoted in an article about his son, an American football player at Oregon State University, by The Oregonian, stated that, in regards to the high school: "The school is the community in Crane. It's the heartbeat of the deal."

Harney County is not in a community college district but has a "contract out of district" (COD) with Treasure Valley Community College. TVCC operates the Burns Outreach Center in Burns.

== Healthcare ==
In 1989, Nellie Nix of The Bulletin described the catchment area of Harney District Hospital in Burns as being Harney County. In 2005, Harney District Hospital provided a traveling doctor in a mobile trailer which visited Crane and other parts of the county.

== Climate ==
According to the Köppen Climate Classification system, Crane has a semi-arid climate, abbreviated "BSk" on climate maps.
