= Harney County, Oregon =

County in Oregon, United States

- County
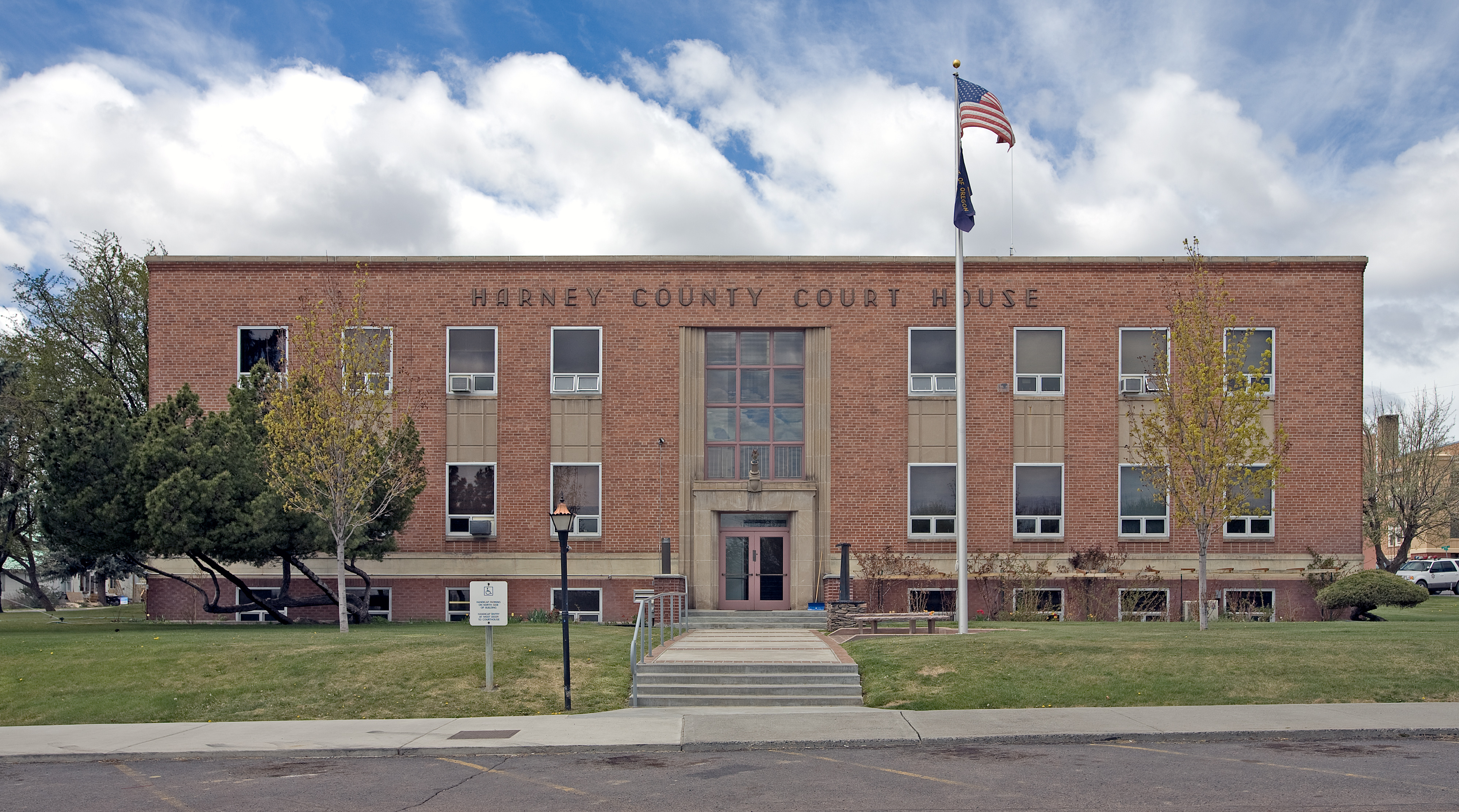
- Harney County Courthouse in Burns

- Seal

- Location within the U.S. state of Oregon
- Coordinates: 43°04′N 118°58′W
- Country: United States
- State: Oregon
- Founded: February 23, 1889
- Named for: William S. Harney
- Seat: Burns
- Largest city: Burns

Area
  - Total: 10,226 sq mi (26,490 km^{2})
  - Land: 10,133 sq mi (26,240 km^{2})
  - Water: 93 sq mi (240 km^{2}) 0.9%

Population (2020)
  - Total: 7,495
  - Estimate (2025): 7,380 ▼
  - Density: 0.7/sq mi (0.27/km^{2})
- Time zone: UTC−8 (Pacific)
  - Summer (DST): UTC−7 (PDT)
- Congressional district: 2nd
- Website: harneycountyor.gov

Map of Harney County

Harney County is one of the 36 counties in the U.S. state of Oregon. As of the 2020 census, the population was 7,495, making it the sixth-least populous county in Oregon. The county seat is Burns. Established in 1889, the county is named in honor of William S. Harney, a military officer of the period, who was involved in the Pig War and popular in the Pacific Northwest.

Harney County is a rural county in southeastern Oregon. It is a five-hour drive from Portland, Oregon and a three-hour drive from Boise, Idaho. The county is bordered by Grant County (to the north), Malheur County (to the east); Washoe County, Nevada and Humboldt County, Nevada (to the south); and Lake, Deschutes, and Crook counties (to the west).

At 10,226 square miles (26,490 km^{2}) in size, the county is the largest in Oregon, and one of the largest in the United States; it is larger in area than six U.S. states. The county is the most sparsely populated in Oregon, with a population density of 0.72 per square mile (0.28/km^{2}). The county has just two incorporated cities: Burns, the county seat and the larger city, with 40% of the population, and Hines, with 20% of the county's population. About 75% of the county's area is federal land, variously managed by the Bureau of Reclamation, Bureau of Land Management, U.S. Fish and Wildlife Service, and U.S. Forest Service. About 10 percent of Harney County's area is part of the Ochoco National Forest and Malheur National Forest. The county also contains the Burns Paiute Indian Reservation within and immediately north of the City of Burns; this 760-acre reservation of the Burns Paiute Tribe is a remnant of the former Malheur Indian Reservation.

Harney County has a "high desert" topography, with low levels of precipitation. About 500 ranches and farms producing cattle, dairy products and hay operate within the county; in the county, cattle outnumber people 14-to-1. Besides ranching and farming, forestry evolves important industries in the county.

The county is of ecological as well as recreational importance. Along with neighboring Grant County, Harney County has the nation's largest Ponderosa pine forest. The county was also a focus of recent efforts to conserve the sage grouse; in 2014, Harney County ranchers signed 30-year agreements with the federal government to protect the sage grouse. Visitors are attracted to the county for its hunting, fishing, and camping activities.

According to the website of the Harney County Sheriff's Office, the sheriff has a staff of six law enforcement officers. Burns has a separate police department but, as of 2008, did not employ enough officers to provide "24-hour" coverage.

== History ==
The Native Americans living in this region at the time of the Lewis and Clark Expedition were the Northern Paiute, who fought with the Tenino and Wasco peoples. Peter Skene Ogden was the first known European to explore this area in 1826 when he led a fur brigade for the Hudson's Bay Company.

In September 3, 1855 Brigadier General Harney led the U.S. Army and surrounded and ambushed a Lakota village killing 86 people and taking many others as prisoners. This site, located in Nebraska, is now known as the Blue Water Massacre or the Battle of Ash Hollow.

Harney County was carved out of the southern two-thirds of Grant County on February 25, 1889. A fierce political battle, with armed "night riders" who spirited county records from Harney to Burns, ended with Burns as the county seat in 1890.

The Malheur River Indian Reservation was created by executive order on March 14, 1871, and the Northern Paiute within the Oregon state boundaries were settled there. The federal government "discontinued" the reservation after the Bannock War of 1878. Descendants of these people form a federally recognized tribal entity, the Burns Paiute Tribe, which had 341 members in 2008. Fewer than 35.5% of the tribal members live on the Burns Paiute Indian Colony near Burns. The tribe formerly earned revenue from a small casino, the Old Camp Casino, before its closure in 2012, and renting out communal tribal lands for grazing rights to local ranchers.

The first white people to arrive through Harney County were French explorers, circa 1750ː Narceese Charbonneau (father of Toussaint Charbonneau), LaValle and a priest named Joseph Nadeau. The men came aboard a Spanish supply ship and left from San Diego on a transcontinental tour to Quebec. Instead of reaching Canada, the men arrived at southern Harney County and continued towards Idaho. In the late 1820s, Peter Skene Ogden made a description of the natural features and Indian culture from Klamath County to Harney County, following the Sylvaille River, and turning up afterwards towards Walla Walla leading a fur brigade for Hudson's Bay Company.

=== 2016 militia occupation ===
On January 2, 2016, the headquarters building of the Malheur National Wildlife Refuge was seized by armed protesters related to the Bundy standoff. The group protested the prison sentences of two ranchers convicted of arson in wildfires set in 2001 and 2006, which the ranchers claimed spread from their land into the wildlife reserve. Militia leaders, including Ammon Bundy and Jon Ritzheimer, were arrested on January 26, 2016, in an event that included the shooting death of militant LaVoy Finicum by law enforcement at a highway blockade between Burns and John Day. The following day, only four militants remained, and they surrendered on February 11, 2016.

== Geography ==
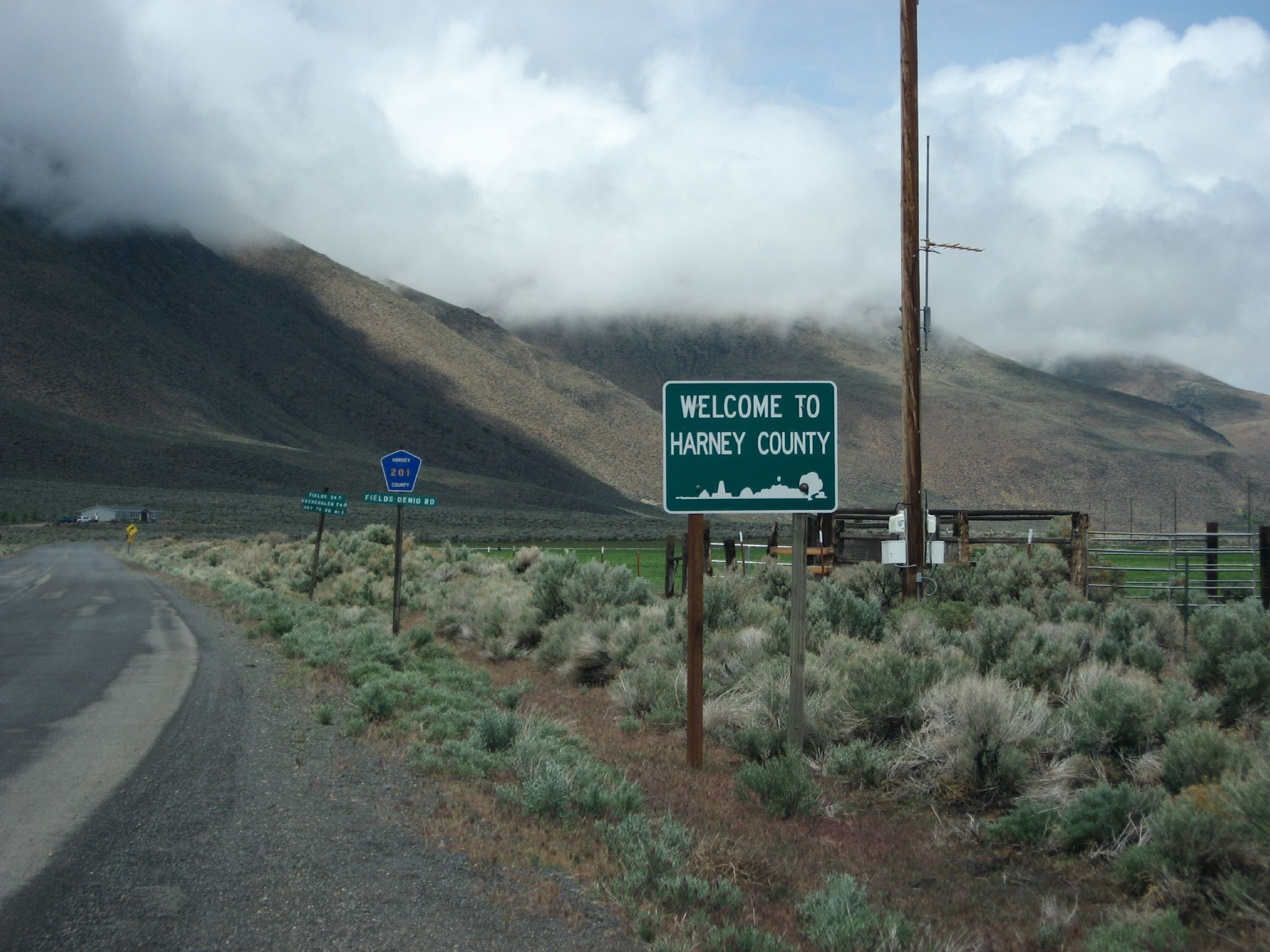
Sign welcoming drivers to Harney County

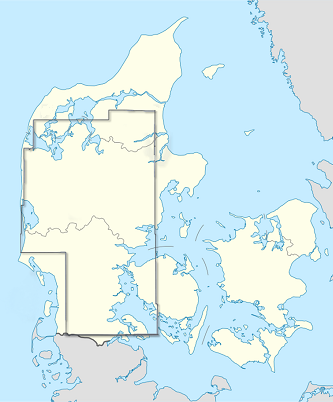
Harney County has a population of less than 8,000 occupying a land area about two-thirds the size of Denmark, shown in this overlay.

According to the United States Census Bureau, the county has a total area of 10,226 square miles (26,490 km^{2}), of which 10,133 square miles (26,240 km^{2}) is land and 93 square miles (240 km^{2}) (0.9%) is water. It is the largest county in Oregon by area and the tenth-largest county in the United States (excluding boroughs and census areas in Alaska).

Steens Mountain is the county's most prominent geographical feature, rising to 9,700 feet (3,000 m) above sea level and spanning many miles across a region that is otherwise fairly flat. To its southeast is the Alvord Desert—the driest place in Oregon—and the Trout Creek Mountains, which extend south into Nevada. South of Steens Mountain, the Pueblo Mountains are another remote range in Oregon and Nevada. North of Steens Mountain lies the Harney Basin, which contains Malheur Lake and Harney Lake.

The Sunday Journal Magazine compared the county's size to that of the state of Maryland.

=== Adjacent counties ===
- Crook County - northwest
- Grant County - north
- Malheur County - east/Mountain Time Border
- Humboldt County, Nevada - south
- Washoe County, Nevada - southwest
- Lake County - west
- Deschutes County - northwest

=== Time Zones ===
Although the county is officially in the Pacific Time Zone, unincorporated Drewsey, just west of the Malheur County line unofficially observes the Mountain Time Zone.

=== National protected areas ===
- Malheur National Forest (part)
- Malheur National Wildlife Refuge
- Ochoco National Forest (part)

== Demographics ==
Historical population
Census	Pop.	Note	%±
1890	2,559		—
1900	2,598		1.5%
1910	4,059		56.2%
1920	3,992		−1.7%
1930	5,920		48.3%
1940	5,374		−9.2%
1950	6,113		13.8%
1960	6,744		10.3%
1970	7,215		7.0%
1980	8,314		15.2%
1990	7,060		−15.1%
2000	7,609		7.8%
2010	7,422		−2.5%
2020	7,495		1.0%
2025 (est.)	7,380	▼	−1.5%
U.S. Decennial Census; 1790–1960 1900–1990; 1990–2000 2010–2020

=== 2020 census ===
As of the 2020 census, the county had a population of 7,495. Of the residents, 22.1% were under the age of 18 and 24.8% were 65 years of age or older; the median age was 44.9 years. For every 100 females there were 102.1 males, and for every 100 females age 18 and over there were 98.7 males. 55.6% of residents lived in urban areas and 44.4% lived in rural areas.

Harney County, Oregon – Racial and ethnic composition Note: the US Census treats Hispanic/Latino as an ethnic category. This table excludes Latinos from the racial categories and assigns them to a separate category. Hispanics/Latinos may be of any race.
Race / Ethnicity (NH = Non-Hispanic)	Pop 1980	Pop 1990	Pop 2000	Pop 2010	Pop 2020	% 1980	% 1990	% 2000	% 2010	% 2020
White alone (NH)	7,767	6,544	6,823	6,648	6,435	93.42%	92.69%	89.67%	89.57%	85.86%
Black or African American alone (NH)	4	2	9	16	5	0.05%	0.03%	0.12%	0.22%	0.07%
Native American or Alaska Native alone (NH)	220	252	276	227	219	2.65%	3.57%	3.63%	3.06%	2.92%
Asian alone (NH)	40	39	39	34	36	0.48%	0.55%	0.51%	0.46%	0.48%
Native Hawaiian or Pacific Islander alone (NH)	x	x	4	1	0	x	x	0.05%	0.01%	0.00%
Other race alone (NH)	27	2	5	6	21	0.32%	0.03%	0.07%	0.08%	0.28%
Mixed race or Multiracial (NH)	x	x	137	196	385	x	x	1.80%	2.64%	5.14%
Hispanic or Latino (any race)	256	221	316	294	394	3.08%	3.13%	4.15%	3.96%	5.26%
Total	8,314	7,060	7,609	7,422	7,495	100.00%	100.00%	100.00%	100.00%	100.00%

=== American Community Survey 2025 data ===
The United States Census Bureau estimated that in 2025, Harney County’s population was 7.380. It was also estimated that the county's population was 84,92% Non-Hispanic White, 6,38% Hispanic or Latino, 0,26% Non-Hispanic Black, 0,61% Asian, 2,94% Native American, 0,11% Pacific Islander, and 4,78% Multiracial.

Total	Population	Percentage
Non-Hispanic White	6.267	84,92%
Hispanic or Latino	471	6,38%
Non-Hispanic Black	19	0,26%
Asian	45	0,61%
Native American	217	2,94%
Pacific Islander	8	0,11%
Non-Hispanic Multiracial	353	4,78%

The racial makeup of the county was 87.6% White, 0.1% Black or African American, 3.3% American Indian and Alaska Native, 0.5% Asian, 0.0% Native Hawaiian and Pacific Islander, 1.5% from some other race, and 7.0% from two or more races. Hispanic or Latino residents of any race comprised 5.3% of the population.

There were 3,174 households in the county, of which 26.2% had children under the age of 18 living with them and 23.9% had a female householder with no spouse or partner present. About 30.9% of all households were made up of individuals and 15.1% had someone living alone who was 65 years of age or older.

There were 3,694 housing units, of which 14.1% were vacant. Among occupied housing units, 67.6% were owner-occupied and 32.4% were renter-occupied. The homeowner vacancy rate was 2.1% and the rental vacancy rate was 6.6%.

=== 2010 census ===
As of the 2010 census, there were 7,422 people, 3,205 households, and 2,069 families residing in the county. The population density was 0.7 inhabitants per square mile (0.27/km^{2}). There were 3,835 housing units at an average density of 0.4 units per square mile (0.15 units/km^{2}). The racial makeup of the county was 91.9% white, 3.1% American Indian, 0.5% Asian, 0.3% black or African American, 1.3% from other races, and 3.0% from two or more races. Those of Hispanic or Latino origin made up 4.0% of the population. In terms of ancestry, 28.7% were German, 18.6% were English, 15.0% were Irish, 6.7% were Scottish, 5.1% were Dutch, and 4.5% were American.

Of the 3,205 households, 26.4% had children under the age of 18 living with them, 52.0% were married couples living together, 8.8% had a female householder with no husband present, 35.4% were non-families, and 30.0% of all households were made up of individuals. The average household size was 2.28 and the average family size was 2.81. The median age was 45.2 years.

The median income for a household in the county was $39,036 and the median income for a family was $46,626. Males had a median income of $40,218 versus $31,046 for females. The per capita income for the county was $20,849. About 14.1% of families and 18.5% of the population were below the poverty line, including 27.5% of those under age 18 and 9.2% of those age 65 or over.

=== 2000 census ===
As of the 2000 census, there were 7,609 people, 3,036 households, and 2,094 families residing in the county. The population density was 1 people per square mile (0.39 people/km^{2}). There were 3,533 housing units at an average density of 0 units per square mile (0/km^{2}). The racial makeup of the county was 91.93% White, 3.97% Native American, 0.51% Asian, 0.13% Black or African American, 0.07% Pacific Islander, 1.30% from other races, and 2.09% from two or more races. 4.15% of the population were Hispanic or Latino of any race. 21.1% were of German, 11.1% American, 10.3% Irish and 9.7% English ancestry.

There is a small, but significant Spanish Basque community.

Approximately 75% of the population of Harney County lives in the Burns-Hines municipal district. Crane is the only other localised population center, with less than 7% of the population of Harney County. Lawen and Riley have no localised populations. The remaining population of Harney County is dispersed throughout the countryside, mostly dwelling on large ranches.

There were 3,036 households, out of which 29.40% had children under the age of 18 living with them, 58.00% were married couples living together, 6.80% had a female householder with no husband present, and 31.00% were non-families. 25.90% of all households were made up of individuals, and 10.20% had someone living alone who was 65 years of age or older. The average household size was 2.45 and the average family size was 2.94.

In the county, the population was spread out, with 26.00% under the age of 18, 6.40% from 18 to 24, 26.60% from 25 to 44, 26.10% from 45 to 64, and 15.00% who were 65 years of age or older. The median age was 40 years. For every 100 females there were 102.90 males. For every 100 females age 18 and over, there were 98.20 males.

The median income for a household in the county was $30,957, and the median income for a family was $36,917. Males had a median income of $27,386 versus $21,773 for females. The per capita income for the county was $16,159. About 8.60% of families and 11.80% of the population were below the poverty line, including 12.70% of those under age 18 and 13.90% of those age 65 or over.

== Communities ==
=== Cities ===
- Burns (county seat)
- Hines

=== Census-designated place ===
- Crane

=== Unincorporated communities ===
- Buchanan
- Diamond
- Drewsey
- Fields
- Frenchglen
- Harney
- Lawen
- New Princeton
- Riley
- Suntex
- Trout Creek
- Van
- Venator
- Voltage
- Wagontire

=== Ghost towns ===
- Andrews
- Blitzen
- Dunnean
- Frost Mill
- Sodhouse

== Politics ==
Like most counties in eastern Oregon, the majority of registered voters who are part of a political party in Harney County are members of the Republican Party. No Democrat has carried Harney County in a presidential election since Lyndon Johnson in 1964. The last time a Democrat was even close to carrying Harney County in a presidential election was Jimmy Carter in 1976 when he lost it by 85 votes. Since 2000, every Republican nominee has received at least 70% of the vote in Harney County in presidential elections. In the 2008 presidential election 70.45% of Harney County voters voted for Republican John McCain, while 25.79% voted for Democrat Barack Obama and 3.73% of voters either voted for a Third Party candidate or wrote in a candidate. These numbers show a slight shift towards the Democratic candidate when compared to the 2004 presidential election, in which 76% of Harney Country voters voted for George W. Bush, while 22.7% voted for John Kerry, and 1.3% of voters either voted for a Third Party candidate or wrote in a candidate. In 1992, the incumbent, George H. W. Bush won with 40.84% of the vote, over Ross Perot, who finished second with 30.37%, and Bill Clinton, who finished third with 28.86%. In the 2020 United States presidential election, Donald Trump won about 78% of Harney County's votes, and Joe Biden won about 20%.

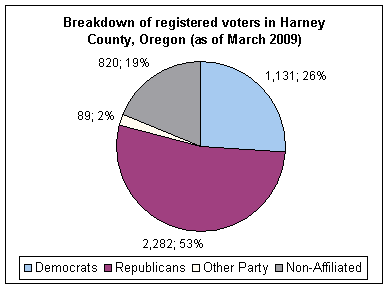

United States presidential election results for Harney County, Oregon
Year	Republican		Democratic		Third party(ies)	
Year	No.	%	No.	%	No.	%
1904	395	58.35%	190	28.06%	92	13.59%
1908	450	52.39%	329	38.30%	80	9.31%
1912	377	30.60%	538	43.67%	317	25.73%
1916	872	37.52%	1,239	53.31%	213	9.17%
1920	1,026	63.26%	479	29.53%	117	7.21%
1924	851	53.83%	436	27.58%	294	18.60%
1928	952	60.60%	600	38.19%	19	1.21%
1932	687	33.22%	1,276	61.70%	105	5.08%
1936	546	28.14%	1,262	65.05%	132	6.80%
1940	912	42.70%	1,214	56.84%	10	0.47%
1944	787	43.87%	997	55.57%	10	0.56%
1948	784	48.28%	802	49.38%	38	2.34%
1952	1,378	58.24%	983	41.55%	5	0.21%
1956	1,512	55.51%	1,212	44.49%	0	0.00%
1960	1,464	54.40%	1,220	45.34%	7	0.26%
1964	1,172	42.48%	1,577	57.16%	10	0.36%
1968	1,617	56.58%	1,036	36.25%	205	7.17%
1972	1,693	59.13%	1,004	35.07%	166	5.80%
1976	1,652	48.49%	1,567	45.99%	188	5.52%
1980	2,313	61.11%	1,110	29.33%	362	9.56%
1984	2,197	62.56%	1,290	36.73%	25	0.71%
1988	1,833	55.05%	1,379	41.41%	118	3.54%
1992	1,350	40.04%	973	28.86%	1,049	31.11%
1996	1,948	55.42%	980	27.88%	587	16.70%
2000	2,799	74.96%	766	20.51%	169	4.53%
2004	2,815	76.04%	839	22.66%	48	1.30%
2008	2,595	70.46%	950	25.79%	138	3.75%
2012	2,607	72.76%	832	23.22%	144	4.02%
2016	2,912	73.28%	683	17.19%	379	9.54%
2020	3,475	77.55%	894	19.95%	112	2.50%
2024	3,307	77.72%	797	18.73%	151	3.55%

== Economy ==
Three industries have traditionally provided the county's economic base: ranching, sheep raising, and timber. The railroad, which extended into the area in 1883, served as a catalyst to the cattle industry but later contributed to its decline. By bringing farmers and sheep men to the area, it created increased competition for productive land. Harvesting and breeding of wild horses was lucrative for a period. Harney County shares the largest Ponderosa Pine forest in the nation with Grant County. Its abundance of game, numerous campsites and excellent fishing have stimulated fast-growing recreational activities.

Although county lands were open to homesteading from 1862 to 1934, the U.S. Bureau of Land Management still owns more than 3 million acres (12,000 km^{2}), or 62%, of the lands within the county boundaries. Facilitated on the national level by the Carey act of 1894, arid land in Harney County was donated to the state for irrigation and settlement, but all water development efforts failed.

Eventually all land claims filed under the reclamation legislation were abandoned or nullified. Malheur National Wildlife Refuge was established in 1908 and expanded in 1936. The refuge now includes 159,872 acres (646.98 km^{2}). Borax has been mined in the Steens area, and uranium has been found on its south side.

== Healthcare ==
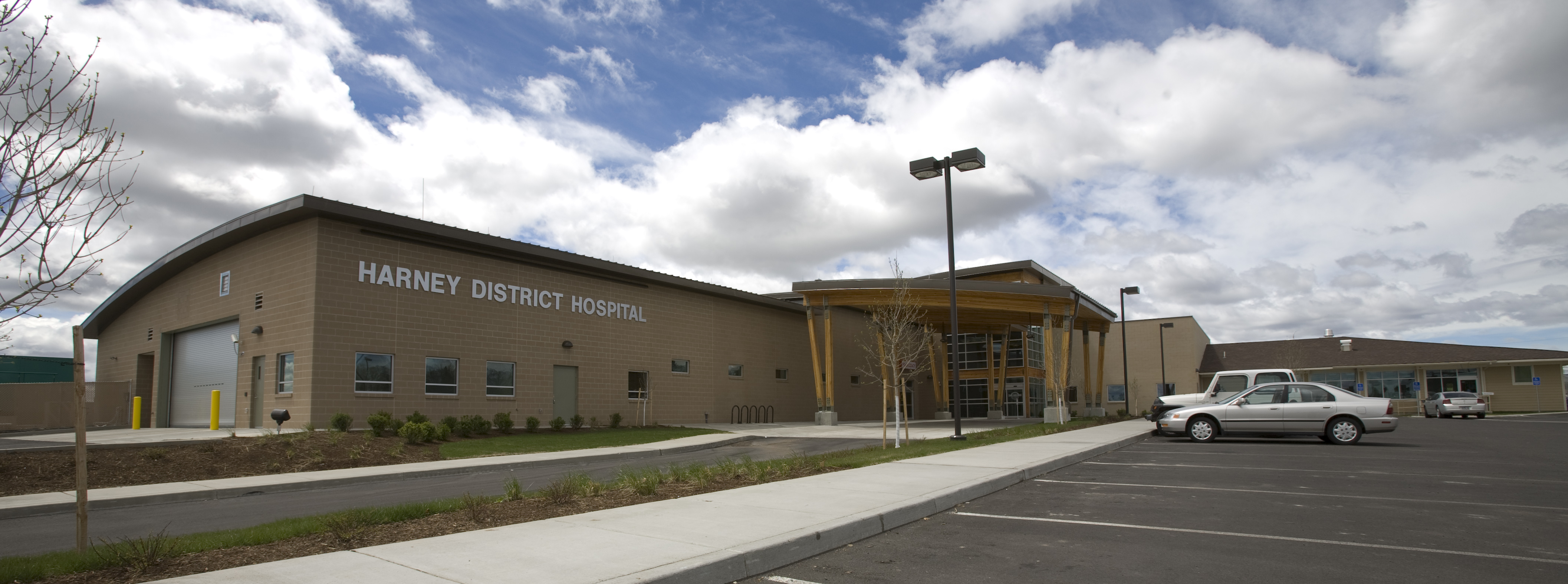
Harney District Hospital

Harney District Hospital is located in Burns. A public hospital, it is under a separate taxing district and has been since 1990, and previously was a part of the county government. In 2005 the hospital provided a traveling doctor in a mobile trailer for southern parts of the county and for Denio, Nevada. The southern part of the county, in 2005, had, in the words of Matthew Preusch of the Associated Press, a "particularly acute" absence of healthcare services. In 2005 Matthew Preusch of The Oregonian, citing the lack of doctors and long distances between the southern part of the county and the hospital, described the area as "the most medically underserved area of all."

== Education ==
School districts include:

- K-12: Harney County School District 3 (Burns and Hines)
- High school: Harney County Union High School District 1J

Elementary school districts

- Harney County School District 4 (Crane Elementary)
- Diamond School District 7
- Double O School District 28
- Drewsey School District 13
- South Harney School District 33 (Fields)
- Frenchglen School District 16
- Pine Creek School District 5
- Suntex School District 10

The county formerly had the Trout Creek School, which in 1969 had two students, making it the smallest school by enrollment in the state. It was a part of its own school district, Trout Creek School District No. 53. In 1975 it was a part of the Fields Trout Creek School District 33. There was also formerly an Andrews School District No. 29, which operated Andrews Elementary School.

The county also formerly had the Lawen Elementary School District, which operated Lawen Elementary School. The Lawen school never reopened after a 1984 flooding, and the Lawen district merged into the Crane elementary district in 1988. The Burns Union High School District, the Burns Elementary School District, and the Hines Elementary School District merged into Harney County District 3 in 1989.

There was also the Sodhouse School District No. 32, based in Princeton.

Harney County is not in a community college district but has a "contract out of district" (COD) with Treasure Valley Community College. TVCC operates the Burns Outreach Center in Burns.

The Harney County Library is located in Burns.

== See also ==
- National Register of Historic Places listings in Harney County, Oregon
