= Crane Union High School =

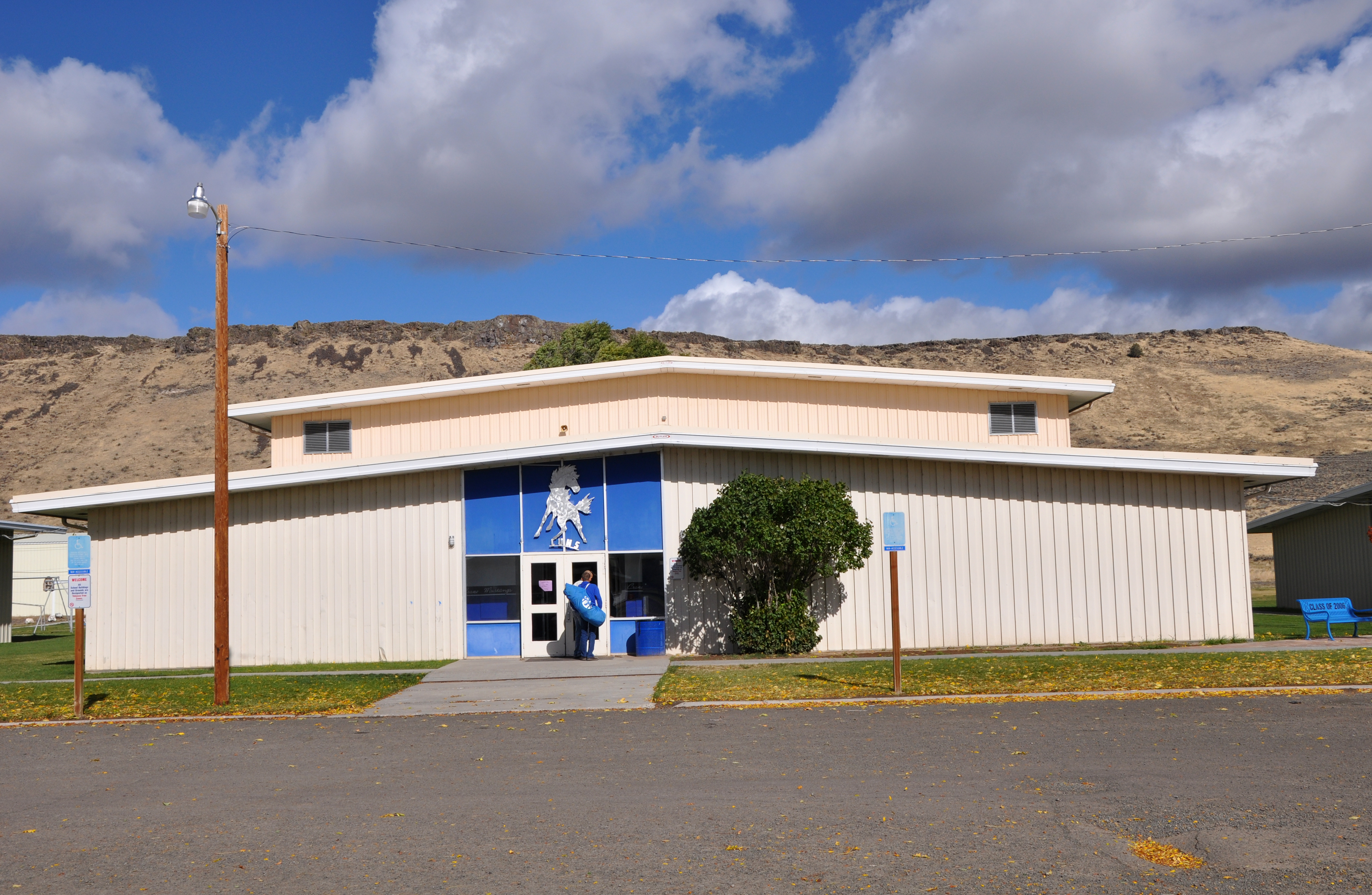

Location
- 43277 Crane-Venator Ln; Crane, (Harney County), Oregon 97732; United States; 43°25′00″N 118°34′29″W

Information
- Type: Public
- Opened: 1918
- School district: Harney County Union High School District 1J
- Principal: Matthew Halwey
- Teaching staff: 5.50 (FTE)
- Grades: 9-12
- Enrollment: 54 (2017–18)
- Student to teacher ratio: 9.82
- Colors: Royal blue, white and black
- Athletics conference: OSAA High Desert League 1A-8
- Mascot: Mustang
- Website: craneedu.org/high-school
- Coordinates from Geographic Names Information System

Crane Union High School is a public high school in Crane, Oregon, United States. It is a boarding school that serves students from a large geographic area.

Its district is known as the Harney County Union High School District 1J, and covers much of Harney County.

In 1976 it was the only American public boarding high school operated by a local school district.

== History ==
It opened in 1918. It moved to Crane circa 1920 after initially being in Lawen. The dormitory began operations in 1931. The Harney County communities chose to have a centralized high school with a boarding facility instead of having multiple high school students at one-room schoolhouses.

By 1950 numerous magazines and other works of journalism had articles written about Crane Union, and education professionals from other states visited the school. At the time, girls only wore trousers when not in instructional time; during that time skirts and dresses were allowed for female students.

On January 25, 1967, a fire ruined multiple buildings of the school facility. The fire also affected Crane Elementary School, which shared the premises. Students were successfully evacuated from the premises. The students temporarily attended Burns Union High School in Burns. People in Oregon donated funds and clothes to replace academic and personal items that were ruined. The insurance policy covered a $400,000 loss. The Oregonian stated that $500,000 would be a possible cost of a new facility. There were some area residents who had wanted merging the Crane HS district into the Burns Union High School District, but instead a bond was made to make replacement buildings for Crane Union HS and the K-8 school. The vote was 317 yes votes to 63 no votes.

The school resumed operations circa 1969. According to B. Marie Jarreau-Danner of the Burns Times-Herald, the replacement facility was, according to "historical material", "the first all-steel building" in the state.

Maurice Thorne began his term as both the superintendent and principal in June 1969. According to Thorne, he at first tried to manage the students in a similar way to how one would manage university students, but he felt this management style did not work. In the 1970s, the school had a rule that stated that female students were not allowed to wear blue jeans during instructional time.

Taylor Perse of Eugene Weekly stated that the community of Crane reoriented itself around the school after the community declined in population. In 1983 the Associated Press wrote that the school became "Crane's sole reason for being".

Eric Nichols became the principal circa 2018.

== Service area ==
The official school district attendance area includes, in addition to Crane: Diamond, Double-O Ranch, Drewsey, Fields, Frenchglen, Riley, and Suntex. In 2002 the size of its attendance boundary was 7,700 square miles (20,000 km^{2}), an area that was about the same size as that of Massachusetts. The Willamette Valley is about half the area of the attendance zone of Crane Union High.

The school also historically served sections of Malheur County, and portions of Humboldt County, Nevada, including Denio. Some communities in Nevada had inter-state agreements. Sending school districts pay the costs of tuition. In 1959, the Crane UHSD territory extended into Malheur County; that year there was a proposal to reorganize the school districts in both counties with part of Crane Union's territory to be given to Malheur County.

Crane Union historically served the Denio area, including when the townsite was in Oregon. The area on the Oregon state line across from Denio is, as of 2020, in the official Crane Union boundary. As of 2004 Denio, Nevada parents with high school aged children may send their children to Crane Union instead of sending them to Albert M. Lowry High School in Winnemucca, Nevada.

== Background ==
Crane Union High School is the only school in Crane Union High School District, which covered the most area in Oregon as of 2006, serving 7,500 square miles (19,000 km^{2}). Students from the surrounding ranches attend Crane Union High School from as far away as 150 miles (240 km). Crane is one of the oldest public boarding schools in the country.

Jeff LaLande, in an Oregon Historical Society publication made in 2005 and updated in 2014, stated that the school was "comparatively expensive" to operate.

== Admissions ==
The district automatically enrolls from the Harney County Union High School District 1J boundary in Harney County. The district also takes tuition-paying students from outside the boundary and students which are sent there by cooperative agreement from other school districts paying tuition.

In 2001 the Crane Union catchment area included less than 500 square miles (1,300 km^{2}) of area in Malheur County, while the district's area in Harney County was over 7,000 square miles (18,000 km^{2}). Some students from Humboldt County, Nevada attend high school at Crane Union. As of 2009 some students in the Juntura area, who are within Juntura School District 12, a K-8 school district, move on to Crane Union for high school. Sometime around 1989, the Brothers School District of Brothers began sending its high school students to Crane Union instead of to Bend Senior High School.

== Governance ==
Harney County Union High School District 1J and Harney County School District 4 (for Crane Elementary) are two separate school districts, and both have their own boards of education. As of 2002, the same person was the superintendent and principal of both districts and both schools (Crane Elementary and Crane Union High).

== Campus ==
It has 80-acre (32 ha) of area. Crane Elementary School is on the same property. The current academic building and dormitory were built for $893,000.

The vocational workshop rooms are larger than the academic classrooms.

The dormitory, funded by money otherwise used for transportation, is for students over 20 miles (32 km) away. Male students have the first floor and female students have the second. The school started boarding in 1928, and established a brick dormitory, which had two floors, in 1931. In the 1940s a dormitory for female students opened. Its current facility, made of cement and steel, opened due to a 1967 fire that ruined the previous building. As of 2023 each room houses two students; Perse characterized the room sizes as larger or the same as such rooms at the University of Oregon. When the school had a larger student population, students were housed four to each room. In the 1990s the school removed televisions and video games from the dormitories, and enacted a policy that only allowed students to leave if their parents allowed them to.

The district also provides housing to employees.

== Student body and staff ==
In 1950 it had 63 students, with some of them Basque Oregoners from Denio, Oregon. In 1976 it had 99 students. In February 1998 it had 77 students, and in November of the same year it was up to 88, with 65 of them boarding. In 2002 the school had 97 students. In 2020 its student count was 96, with boarders making up 60 of them. In 2002, the common class sizes were about 10-15 students.

In 2013 Eric Cain of Oregon Public Broadcasting stated that the student body is "some of the most rural kids in the state – maybe the country". In 2025 Ryan Clarke of The Oregonian wrote that "Most Crane students come from agricultural backgrounds". In 2002 some had special driving permits that one could obtain beginning at age 14. Many of the students are alumni of one room schoolhouses and had regularly helped their families with ranch work prior to leaving for high school. Nichols described the school culture as "very neighborhood-ish" despite the students coming from a vast rural area.

As of 1983 it was common for unmarried teachers to teach for one or two years at Crane Union before moving elsewhere in response to the area being isolated.

A teacher quoted in a 1989 article in The Bulletin stated that student discipline was in a very good condition at the school. A student quoted in a 2002 Associated Press article stated that illegal recreational drugs were very uncommon, with alcohol consumption being the most severe occurrence. In 1998 the vice principal stated that chewing tobacco was a more common issue compared to other recreational drugs. In 1976, snuff was common among the student body, while marijuana was considered highly taboo and lacked a presence. Thorne stated in 1976 that some students had issues with alcohol consumption but that this ceased when the school stopped allowing students to go to the movie theater in Burns.

== Academics ==
In 2008, 100 percent of the school's seniors received a high school diploma. Of 24 students, 24 graduated and none dropped out.

Most students, as of 2002, went on to universities and colleges.

In 2002, there were 18 Advanced Placement courses available. That year, the school had satellite access for additional courses that could not be offered in person.

In 1983 the teachers offered extra classes partly because the area had few other activities available, and focusing on teaching was a pastime available.

== Transportation ==
As of 2002 the district has no school bus for students. Students may drive themselves to/from school on weekends. This is because, as of 1972, the school officials use the funding from the state, used by other districts for transportation purposes, to fund the dormitory. In 1983 the vice principal, Bill Thew, stated that the cost would be higher if the district had used school buses.

In 1975 the school district owned a school bus but only used it for transportation to and from athletic events.

In 2001 the district gave money to compensate parents for transporting their children to and from the school. As of 1985, the district gave parents this aid money on a monthly basis, at the end of said month. As of 1985, if a student ate a school meal, the cost was taken from the aid money that was to be given at the end of the month.

In 1950 the district had a bus to take students to Burns, Oregon so they could access entertainment. By 1976, the school no longer allowed students to go to the theater in Burns.

== Athletics and extracurricular activities ==
In 1998 about 90% of the students participated in athletics.

As of 2023 several students partake in rodeos outside of school functions. The school previously had rodeo as an official sport. Fears of legal problems meant that rodeo was withdrawn as an official sport. In 1983, the school had a mechanical bull in its possession.

The school newspaper is called The Whirlwind. James C. Flanigan of the Oregon Journal wrote that this publication "received national awards."

== Feeder patterns ==
The high school, in its official attendance zone, takes students from the following K-8 school districts:

- Diamond School District 7
- Double O School District 28
- Drewsey School District 13
- Frenchglen School District 16
- Harney County School District 4 (Crane Elementary School)
- Pine Creek School District 5
- South Harney County School District 33 (Fields School)
- Suntex School District 10

As of 2004 Denio School of the Humboldt County School District would also be a feeder school as Denio, Nevada students had Crane Union as one option for high school.

== See also ==
- List of high schools in Oregon
- List of boarding schools in the United States
