= Catlow (disambiguation) =

Catlow is a 1971 western film.

Catlow may also refer to:

== People ==
- Agnes Catlow (1806–1889), British science writer
- Charles Catlow (1908–1986), English cricketer
- Richard Catlow (born 1947), British chemist
- Ruth Catlow (born 1968), English artist-theorist and curator
- Thomas Catlow (1892–1976), English footballer

== Places ==
- Catlow Valley (Oregon)
- Rock Creek (Catlow Valley)

== Other ==
- Catlow Theater
