= William Hanley (disambiguation) =

William Hanley (1931–2012) was an American author, playwright, and screenwriter.

William or Bill Hanley may also refer to:

- Bill Hanley (ice hockey) (1915–1990), Canadian ice hockey administrator
- Bill Hanley (rancher) (1861–1935), American pioneer and rancher in Oregon
- Bill Hanley (sound engineer) (born 1937), sound engineer at the Woodstock festival, 1969
- William A. Hanley (1886–1966), American mechanical engineer
