= Bill Hanley (rancher) =

William D. Hanley
- Bill Hanley circa 1930
- Born: February 8, 1861; Jacksonville, Oregon, USA
- Died: September 15, 1935 (aged 74); Pendleton, Oregon, USA
- Occupation: Rancher

William D. Hanley (February 8, 1861 – September 15, 1935) was a pioneer rancher in Harney County in southeastern Oregon. He owned several ranches between Burns, Oregon and Harney Lake. Together, his properties comprised one of the largest privately owned cattle operations in the United States. Hanley was also a progressive thinker and well known host. Among his personal friends were leading political figures, fellow cattle barons, industrialist, writers, and artists including Theodore Roosevelt, William Howard Taft, William Jennings Bryan, Peter French, James J. Hill, CES Wood, and Will Rogers. Hanley's progressive political views led him to run for Governor of Oregon and the United States Senate. A strong advocate of wildlife conservation, much of his ranch is now part of the Malheur National Wildlife Refuge.

== Early life ==
Bill Hanley was born in Jacksonville, Oregon on February 8, 1861. He grew up tending livestock on his father's farm. In 1879, he moved to Harney County in eastern Oregon with his brother John. His father told the two young men to find a good valley with water and hold on to it. The brothers initially purchased land near Burns. Another brother, Ed, later joined them. After his two brothers moved to Alaska, Hanley acquired the Double O Ranch near Harney Lake for $6 an acre. Over time, Hanley turned it into one of the county's largest cattle ranches. After he was married in 1892, Hanley and his wife Clara made their ranch a showplace for worldly guests who wanted to enjoy the privacy and open space of southeastern Oregon.

== Cattle King ==
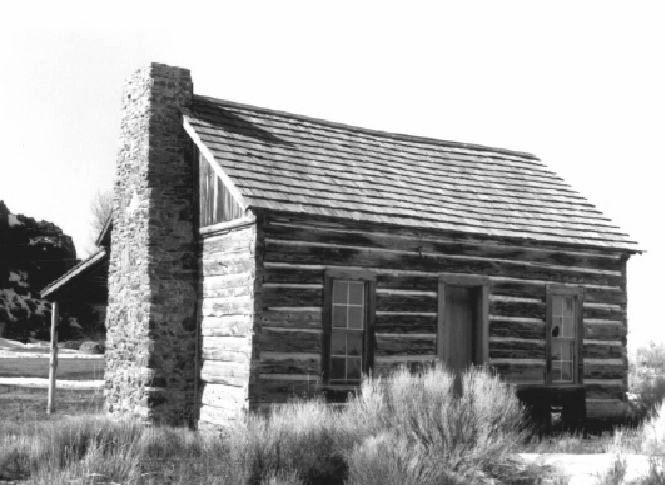
Historic blacksmith's cabin on Double O Ranch

Hanley operated five ranches, totaling over 25,000 acres (100 km^{2}) of deeded property. His Bell A Ranch was three miles east of Burns. It only covered 6,700 acres (27 km^{2}), but it was widely regarded as one of the finest ranch estates in the western United States. His Double O Ranch was over 17,000 acres (69 km^{2}). At the Double O Ranch, it was 8 miles (13 km) from ranch gate to front door of the main house. Hanley also had access to thousands of acres of public range land. In 1913, The New York Times reported that Hanley's cattle operation covered 200,000 acres (810 km^{2}). He eventually established the Harney Valley Improvement Company to promote his land interests and encourage the development of Harney County.

Hanley normally drove cattle to market four times a year. Each drive covered over 100 miles (160 km), sometimes as much as 250 miles (400 km). He delivered his stock to the railhead at either Huntington, Oregon in southern Baker County or Ontario, Oregon on the Idaho border. Hanley was an expert on selecting routes for his cattle drives. He carefully planned each trip to utilize natural water sources and seasonal grasslands along the way. In Steens Mountain in Oregon's High Desert Country, E. R. Jackman wrote: "His riders swore that in all of his drives he never once arrived with fewer cattle than he had at the start." Because he always delivered healthy herds, cattle buyers paid premium prices for Hanley's cattle.

During the time he was building his ranch empire, Hanley knew the other powerful eastern Oregon cattle barons well. His peers included Peter French, the driving force behind the French-Glenn Cattle Company and owner of the vast P Ranch; John Devine, the first white settler in Harney County and founder of the White Horse Ranch; and Henry Miller, head of the Miller and Lux Company that controlled over 1,000,000 acres (4,000 km^{2}) of land in California, Oregon, and Nevada.

== Conservationist ==
Hanley's property included the lower Silver Creek drainage and several lakes that provided water to irrigate his ranch lands. The ranch's riparian areas, lake shore wetlands, and grassy meadows provided habitat for migratory birds traveling along the Pacific Flyway. A number of natural warm springs made the lakes a winter haven for non-migratory bird as well. Numerous birds including great white egrets, herons, pelicans, wild swans, Canada geese, and many duck species nested on the Double O Ranch.

Throughout his life, Hanley was a strong advocate of wildlife conservation. Deer, antelope, beaver, and countless bird species were abundant throughout his ranch lands. His ranches became feeding stops for wild geese during migration seasons. Some geese were so sure of being fed at the Double O Ranch that they made their appetites known by attacking the cookhouse door with their wings until grain was put out for them. Hanley often invited friends to visit the Double O Ranch in the fall just to watch the great flocks of migrating geese and swans. He was also known to have hunters arrested if they were caught shooting birds on Double O property.

== Sage of Harney County ==
Bill Hanley was a progressive thinker and homespun philosopher, who became famous for his ranch hospitality. He entertained guests at his Bell A Ranch near Burns or took them to the rustic Double O Ranch to enjoy the outdoors. His guest included prominent politicians, industrialist, literary figures, and artists from all over the United States.

Hanley counted among his personal friend political leaders with widely divergent views from conservative Republicans like William Howard Taft to populist Democrats like Williams Jennings Bryan. His personal political views were closely aligned with his friend and fellow Bull Moose progressive Theodore Roosevelt. He also included among his close friends business tycoons such as James J. Hill, owner of the Great Northern Railway and well known literary figures like CES Wood, poet Edwin Markham, and painter Childe Hassam. The sculptor Alexander Phimister Proctor and his family actually live on the Hanley ranch for over a year. Before heading to Alaska on the cross-country flight that took his life, Will Rogers stopped in Burns to refuel his aircraft and to see his friend Bill Hanley.

Hanley was a nationally known figure. In 1911, Hanley accompanied a delegation of eight western governors, including Oregon Governor Oswald West, on a trip to New York City. While several of the governors were quoted in The New York Times's report of the visit, Hanley was the center of attention throughout the visit. During subsequent visits to New York City, The New York Times announced his arrival and published his itinerary, referring to him as a pioneer, philosopher, and one of the most prosperous and influential men on the Pacific Coast.

Hanley lobbied his powerful friend, James Hill, to extend his Great Northern railroad system into central Oregon. Eventually, Hill built a north-south rail line along the Deschutes River. The ceremony to drive the last spike was held in Bend, Oregon on 5 October 1911. It is reported in a number of sources that after the final golden spike was driven into the track and removed for display, Hill gave the spike to Hanley, saying: "I built this railroad so I could come see you, my friend."

Hanley was an advocate of progressive government. In 1914, he was the progressive Bull Moose Party's candidate for a United States Senate seat from Oregon. He finished third in a five-person race, doing particularly well in Harney and Malheur counties in rural eastern Oregon and in the state's urban center of Portland. He also ran unsuccessfully for Governor of Oregon, also on a progressive platform.

Hanley had been appointed to the Oregon State Highway Commission in 1931, but had to resign in 1933 due to ill health. Hanley died on 15 September 1935, while celebrating Bill Hanley Day at the Pendleton Round-Up. The Round-Up's organizers had invited Hanley to attend a day of rodeo events which were dedicated to the Sage of Harney County. He received rousing cheers and standing ovations at every stop. Shortly after the final event, Hanley suffered a heart attack. He died the next morning at the home of a friend.

== Gallery of Hanley friends ==
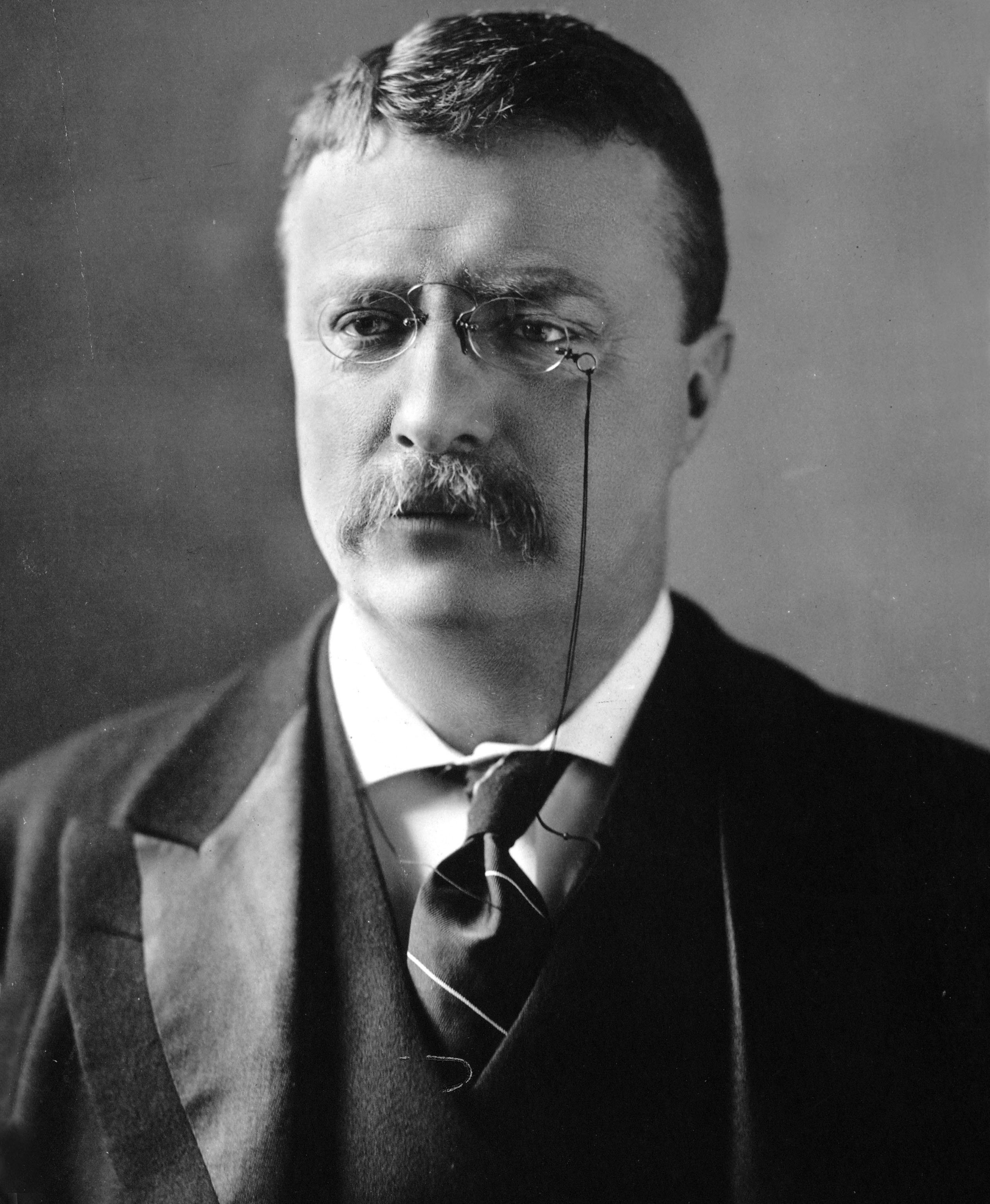
* Theodore Roosevelt

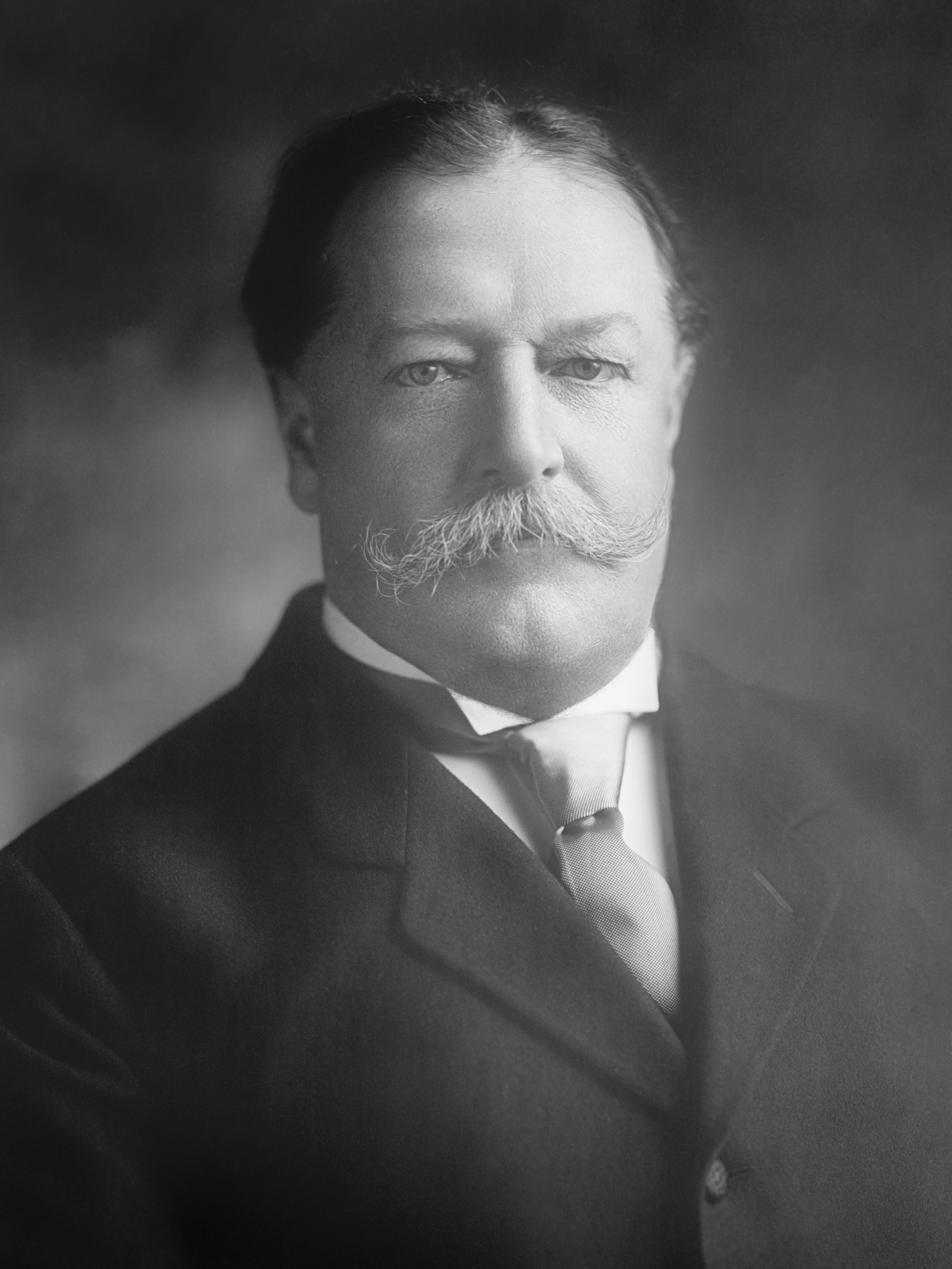
* William H. Taft

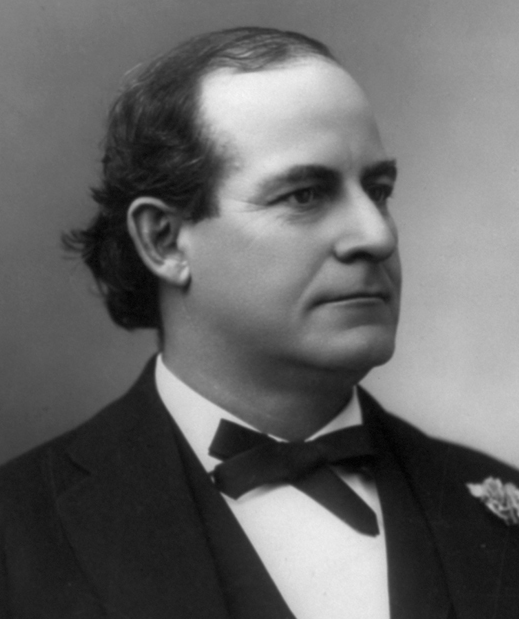
* William J. Bryan

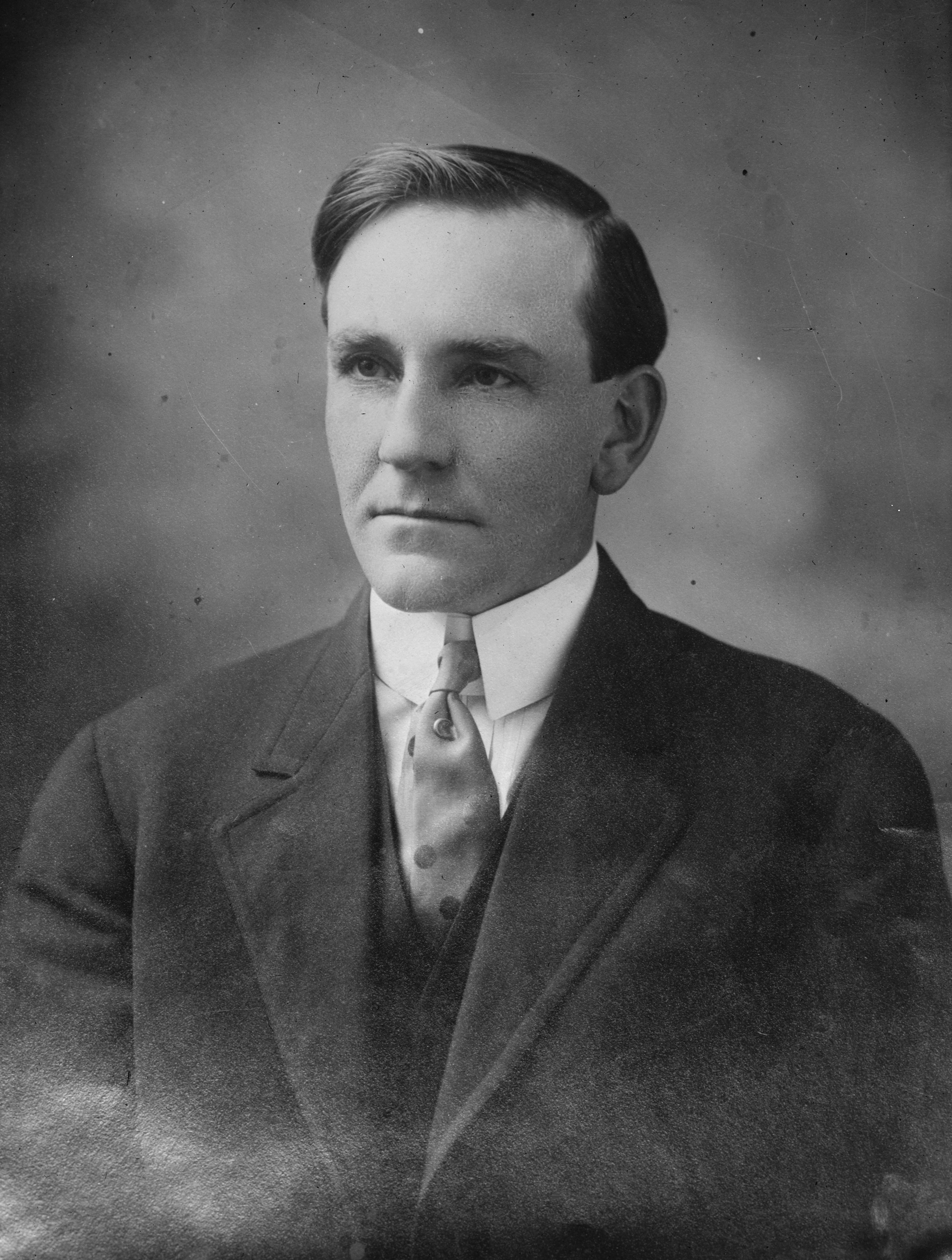
* Oswald West

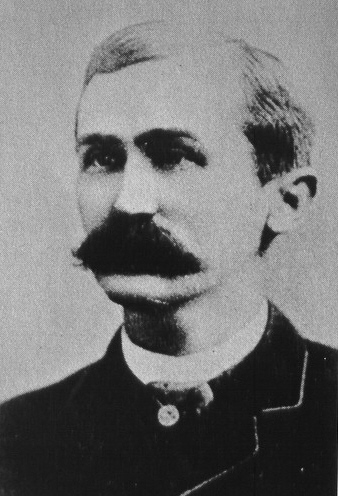
* Peter French

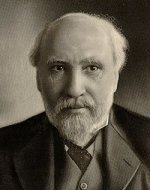
* James J. Hill

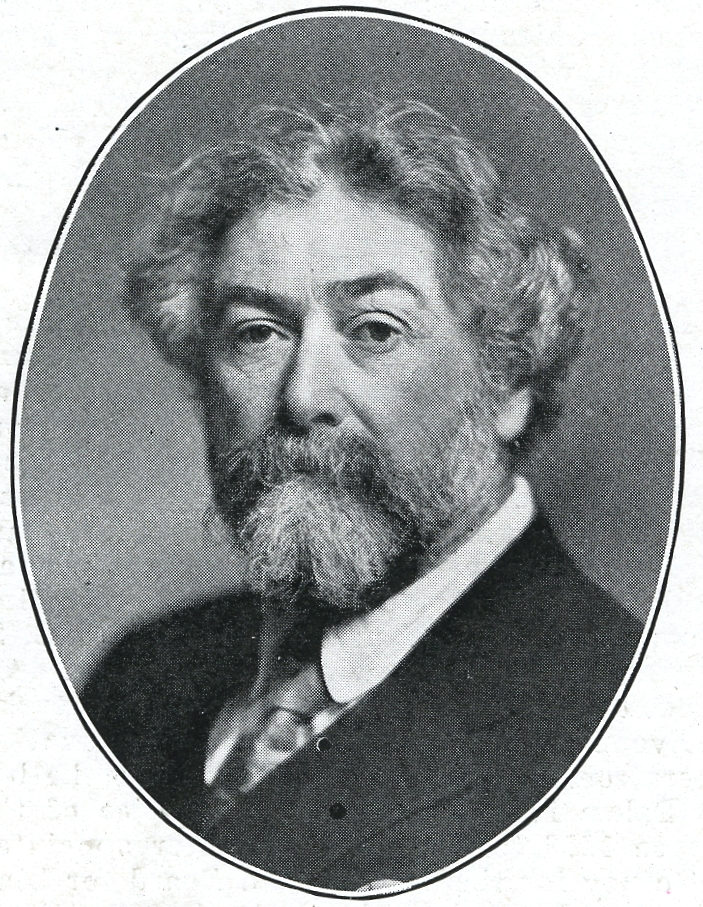
* CES Wood

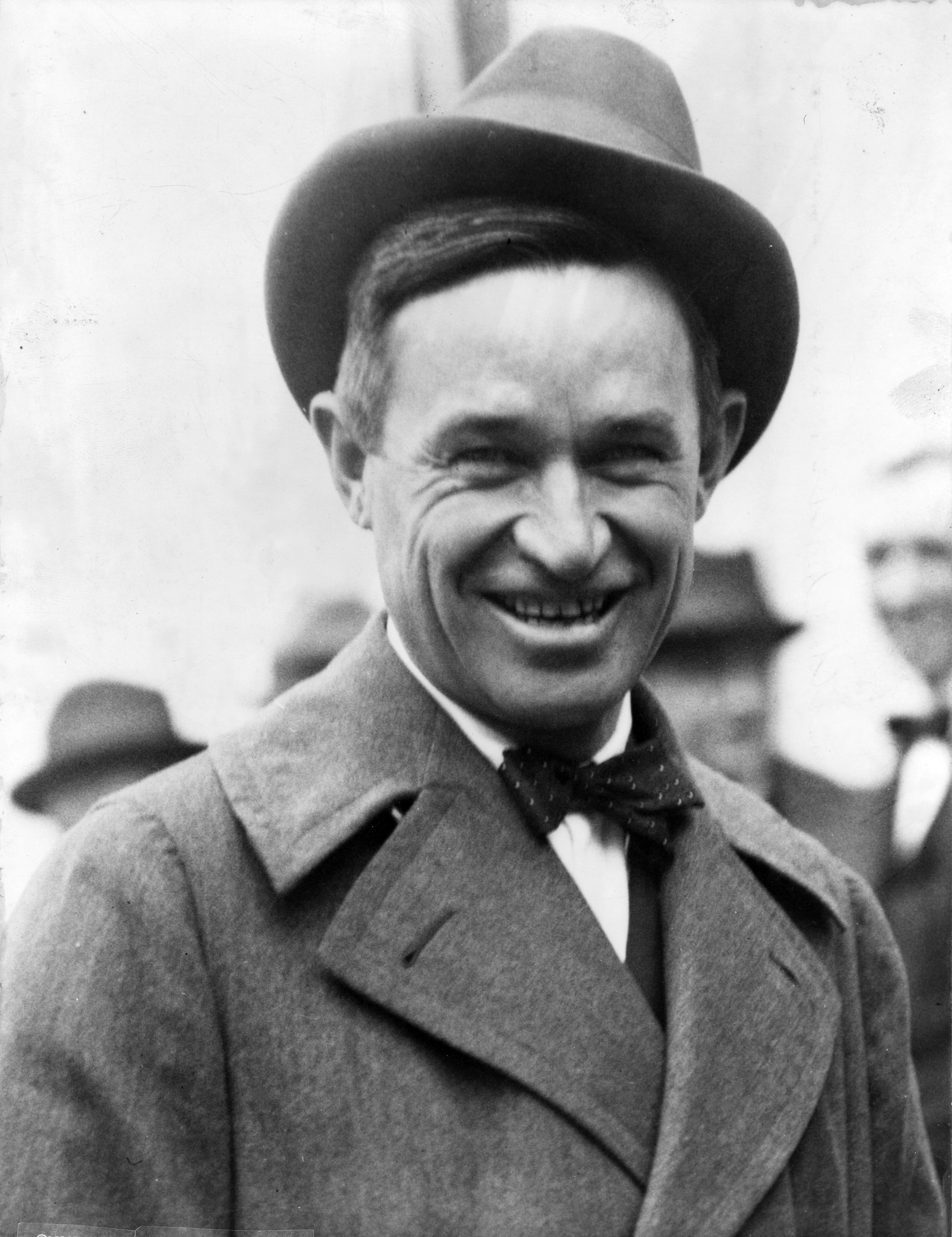
* Will Rogers

== Legacy ==
In 1941, the United States Government purchased 14,751 acres (59.70 km^{2}) of Double O Ranch land from the Hanley family for $118,000, adding it to the adjacent Malheur National Wildlife Refuge to expand shorebird habitat and protect critical waterfowl nesting areas. In 1982, the two remaining buildings at the Double O Ranch site were listed on the National Register of Historic Places.

Written in the 1930s, Hanley's memoirs were edited and published in 2001, under the title Feelin' Fine!. It is a combination of Oregon history, recollections of people Hanley knew, and his personal thoughts on things that interested him. The book ends: "It's just another season. The winter has passed, the water has run, the grass is coming....Feelin' fine!"
