= David L. Shirk Ranch =

- U.S. National Register of Historic Places
- U.S. Historic district
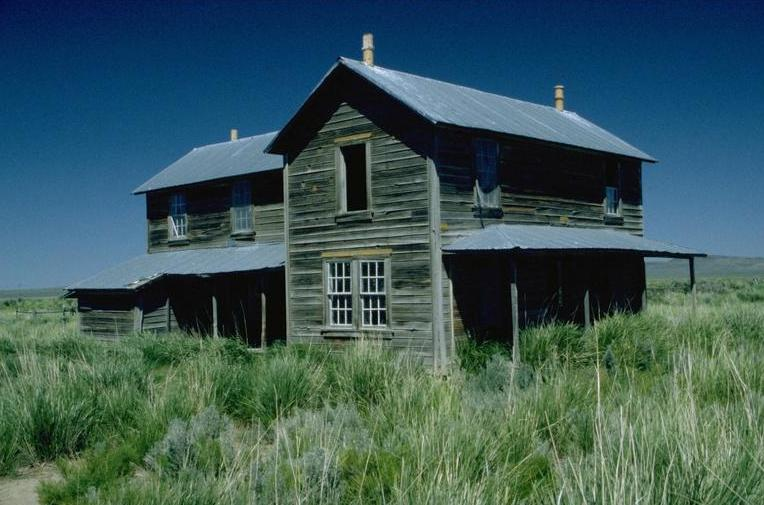
- Abandoned house at the Shirk Ranch

- Location within Oregon Location within the United States
- Location: Lake County, Oregon, USA
- Nearest city: Lakeview, Oregon, USA
- Coordinates: 42.23850°N 119.51994°W
- Built: 1881 to 1910
- Architectural style: Simple vernacular
- NRHP reference No.: 09000891
- Added to NRHP: 2009

The David L. Shirk Ranch is a historic ranch located in the Guano Valley of eastern Lake County, Oregon, United States. The ranch was originally homesteaded in 1881. It was purchased by David L. Shirk in 1883. He operated the ranch until 1914. The property was acquired by the United States Government in 1942. The ranch is now administered by the Bureau of Land Management. The remaining historic ranch buildings are listed on the National Register of Historic Places.

== Early history ==
The Shirk Ranch is located on Bureau of Land Management property in the remote Guano Valley of southeastern Oregon. The ranch complex is in the Oregon high desert, just south of the Hart Mountain National Antelope Refuge in the northwest corner of the Great Basin region of North America. Native peoples inhabited the area for at least 10,000 years prior to the arrival of European explorers. The Northern Paiutes occupied the area prior to the arrival of European settlers. They had adapted to the high desert environment by living in scattered groups and moving frequently to take advantage of season lakes and migrating game animals.

In the first half of the 19th century, the area around the Shirk Ranch was explored by trappers and several military expeditions. In 1865, the United States Army built Old Camp Warner on the southeastern slope of Hart Mountain along upper Guano Creek. However, the post was abandoned within a year. A few years later, the Oregon Central Military Wagon Road was built through the Guano Valley on its way from Eugene, Oregon to Silver City, Idaho. However, that venture was really a scam intended to acquire government land rather than create a viable road. As a result, the "road" was never more than a desert track. There was no permanent settlement in the area until a decade later when cattlemen began to take advantage of the open range in southeastern Oregon for grazing.

The Shirk Ranch property was originally homesteaded by R.A. Turner around 1881 and then sold to William Herron. Shirk bought the ranch from Herron in 1883. When Shirk purchased the land, there were three building on the property, a house and two sheds. There is no record of the size of the property when Shirk bought it, but county tax records show the ranch was 480 acres in 1887.

== David Shirk ==
David L. Shirk was born in Parke County, Indiana in 1844. He was the oldest of nine children. He left home at the age of 22 to travel west. He spent several years working as a cowboy on cattle drives from Texas to southern Idaho. His younger brother William joined him in 1874, and together they moved to Oregon. They both made land claims in the Catlow Valley in what is now Harney County, Oregon.

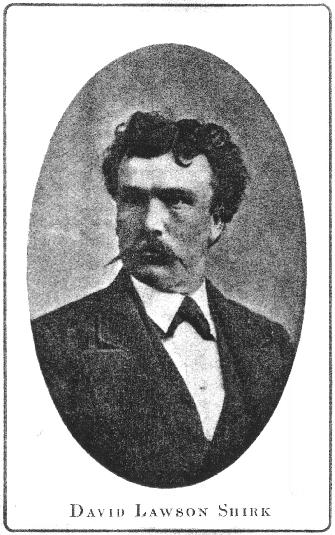
David Shirk at age 28

Later, the brothers acquired land in neighboring Guano Valley, approximately 50 miles west of their Catlow Valley ranch. They used the Guano Valley ranch to raise horses, while their main Catlow Valley ranch was a cattle operation. They were successful enough at their cattle business that their ranch became the social center for the local ranching community. Eventually, a post office was opened at their Catlow Valley ranch. The Shirk post office was moved to their Guano Lake ranch in 1903, where it continued through 1905.

The Catlow Valley was the scene of a number of Indian attacks during the Bannock War of 1878. Both Shirk brothers were engaged in defending their ranch. In one incident, William Shirk and two teamsters were ambushed. His two companions were killed outright and the Indians pursued Shirk for several miles before giving up the chase.

The Shirk brothers eventually acquired about 50,000 acres (200 km^{2}), controlling much of the water in the Catlow Valley. This was quite contentious since the vast P Ranch owned by cattle baron Peter French extended south into the Catlow Valley as well. As result, the Shirks had to compete with French for Catlow Valley grazing land and water. During one skirmish over a land claim in 1889, David Shirk shot and killed one of French's employees. Shirk was tried for murder and acquitted.

After the trial, Shirk moved his home ranch west from the Catlow Valley to his Guano Valley property, probably to help avoid conflict with French and his employees. By 1899, Shirk had increased his Guano Valley parcel to 1,080 acres (4.4 km^{2}). In 1914, Shirk sold his ranch holdings to pursue other business opportunities. Eventually, he moved to Berkeley, California, where he died in 1928.

== Bureau of Land Management ==
Shirk sold his ranch to the Lake County Land and Livestock Company which owned the neighboring 7T Ranch. This allowed the 7T Ranch to extend its grazing eastward from its home range in the Warner Valley. In 1928, the ranch was bought by a Cedarville, California partnership, Mitchell and McDaniel. However, the property was taken by the Bank of Willows (California) in a foreclosure action that same year. For a number of years, the bank leased the property to Zetus Spaulding, who was married to David Shirk's daughter, Olive. The United States Government acquired the property in 1942, but Spaulding continued to live at the ranch until his death in 1945. Today, the property is administered by the Bureau of Land Management.

The Shirk Ranch site in the Guano Valley borders an emergent marsh and meadow lands watered by Guano Creek, which drains the southeastern slope of Hart Mountain. The area provides habitat for migrating waterfowl as well as local birds and wildlife. Bureau of Land Management actively manages the cattle grazing leases in the area to preserve the wetland habitat and ensure wildlife diversity around the historic ranch complex.

Because it is an excellent example of a pioneer cattle ranch in southeastern Oregon, the Shirk Ranch was listed on the National Register of Historic Places on November 4, 2009. The historic district covers 14.5 acres (0.059 km^{2}). There are nineteen structures in the historic district. Fourteen are contributing elements and five are non-contributing. Today, the historic Shirk Ranch suffers from benign neglect. The ranch has never been fully inventoried to determine the significance of its assets and none of the buildings have been stabilized or restored. As a result, several of the historic buildings are in poor condition.

== Structures ==
The Shirk Ranch complex included seven historic buildings and five other contributing structures plus two separate contributing sites, the ranch dump area and a grave. Most of the ranch buildings were constructed during two periods. The first phase was in the early 1880s and then a second surge of building around 1910. The ranch building constructed in the 1880s included the original ranch house (today, only a stone fireplace is left standing), the oldest part of the blacksmith shop, and a small stone-clad shed which has collapsed. Around 1910, Shirk added a number of other buildings. These include the existing main house, two bunkhouses, a barn, a wood shed, a root cellar, an outhouse, a chicken coop/animal shed, a water tower, two wells, original fences, and the hand-dug irrigation system. All of these buildings are wood-frame structures covered either in horizontal weatherboard or vertical wood planking with wood-shingle roofing. All of the buildings were painted at one time. The main house was painted white. All the other buildings were painted red.

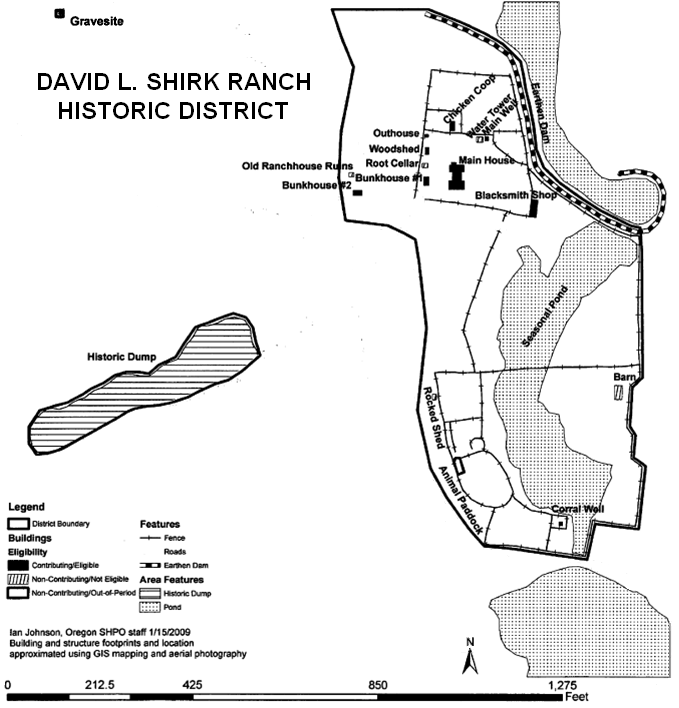
David L. Shirk Ranch Historic District

The historic district has fourteen contributing elements. They include the main house, two bunkhouses, a blacksmith shop, a wood shed, an outhouse, a chicken coop/animal shed, a water tower, two wells, original fences, and the hand-dug irrigation system. All of these historic elements are part of the main ranch complex which covers 13.1 acres (0.053 km^{2}). There are two additional contributing elements, a dump area and a grave site, located on two small non-contiguous parcels of land west of the main ranch complex. Together the three sites comprise a 14.5 acres (0.059 km^{2}) historic district.

- The main residence was built around 1910. It is located at the north end of the ranch compound, facing south. It is a two-story I-shaped structure, 30 feet (9.1 m) wide and 44 feet (13 m) long. It is a wood-frame structure with shiplap siding. It rests on a stone foundation and has a gable roof. It has six-over-six double-hung sash windows with simple molding frames. The house has a large front porch with hand-carved support posts. There are covered porches on the other three sides as well. The house was originally painted white. The interior was finished with plaster, simple trim and molding, and paneled doors. The first floor has four main rooms and two large pantries. The front door opens to a central hallway and a stairs leading to the second floor. There are two large bedrooms at the front of the house, one on either side of the central hallway. The hallway leads to a large living room in the center of the house. The living room is 20 feet (6.1 m) long and 14 feet (4.3 m) wide. The living room is connected to the kitchen which has two adjoining pantries. The second floor has three large rooms, two bedrooms at the front of the house and a large family room above the living room and kitchen. There is no second floor above the pantries. There have been no major structural alterations or additions made to the house. The house was used as a bunkhouse for ranch hands into the 1980s.
- The first bunkhouse is a one-story building with a footprint of 12 feet (3.7 m) by 18 feet (5.5 m). It is located west of the main house, facing south. It has a wood-frame structure with a stone foundation, plank floor, and a gable roof. It has horizontal weatherboard siding with corner boards. The doors are centered on the north and south ends of the building, each flanked by a small square window.
- The second bunkhouse is a one-story building with a footprint of 17 feet (5.2 m) by 22 feet (6.7 m). It is located west of the first bunkhouse, facing south. It is a wood-frame structure on a stone foundation with a plank floor and gable roof. It has vertical board and batten siding with corner boards. There are vertical paneled doors on south and east sides each flanked by a small square window.
- The center section of the blacksmith shop was built in 1880s. The shop was expanded on both ends around 1910. It is located approximately 150 feet (46 m) southeast of the main house. It is a one-story structure measuring 14 feet (4.3 m) by 31 feet (9.4 m). It is a wood-frame building on a stone foundation with board and batten siding and a gable roof. There is a shed-roof attachment that extends the structure by 8 feet (2.4 m) on the south side. The shop has large double doors on the east side and a vertical plank door on the west side. There is a small window on the south side of the building.
- The wood shed was built about 1910. It is located on the western edge of the compound. It is an L-shaped structure. The building is 15 feet (4.6 m) by 18 feet (5.5 m) with a dirt floor, board and batten siding, and asymmetric gable covered with a galvanized metal roof. There are two separate doors on the east side and a third door on south side.
- The chicken coop/animal shed is a one-story building measuring 9 feet (2.7 m) by 28 feet (8.5 m). It is located north of the main house, facing south. It is a wood-frame structure made of rough sawn horizontal planking on the north side and vertical board and batten siding on the south side. It has two interior rooms, dirt floors, and a sheet metal shed roof. The door and several small windows are located on the east side.
- The outhouse is wood-frame structure with a gable roof. It is now located at the northwest corner of the compound. However, it was customary to relocate outhouses periodically so its location probably changed a number of times while it was in use at the ranch. It has shiplap siding with corner boards. It has a vertical plank door on north side.
- The two-story water tower was built around 1910. It is located approximately 65 feet (20 m) northeast of the main house. It has a 16 foot (4.9 m) square footprint. It has a low-pitch hip roof with shiplap siding with rubble stone covering the lower exterior walls. The stone walls have partially collapsed due to severe structural settlement. There are two doors on east elevation, one on the first floor and the other above it on the second floor. Inside, there is an enclosed 18 foot (5.5 m) diameter galvanized metal water tank housed on the second floor. The tank is supported by floor boards laid over log joists supported by log posts.
- There are two wells on the property. The main well is located approximately 6 feet (1.8 m) east of the water tower. It is constructed of native stone and mortar with a 12 foot (3.7 m) square wooden cover. The well's water level is normally about 10 feet (3.0 m) below ground level. The second well is located south of the main house near the corral. The well is approximately 10 feet (3.0 m) in diameter. It is rock lined and has a wooden cover. This is probably the original ranch well.
- There is an extensive system of juniper post corrals and board fences around the ranch complex. There are also historic split rail and willow fences along with modern steel post fences. Most of the fences have been repaired with various materials making them hard to attribute to a specific time period.
- The ranch irrigation system is quite extensive and includes both historic and modern elements. The most obvious historic irrigation structure is the earthen dam north and east of the ranch complex. The dam begins as a low earth-berm just north of the ranch's perimeter fence. It gradually grows to a height of 8 feet (2.4 m) at a point east of the main ranch area. The dam is faced with hand-placed stones on the south side to re-enforce the earthen structure. The dam opens to a fenced pond south of the main ranch. A series of ditches once channeled the water throughout the meadow lands south and east of the ranch compound.
- The ranch dump site is located on a separate 1.3 acres (0.0053 km^{2}) parcel of land, approximately 500 feet (150 m) southwest of the main ranch complex. It contains a wide variety of used materials including domestic artifacts, fencing material, wagon parts, pieces of machinery, a tractor, and an automobile. Because these items help place the ranch operations in context over time, the dump site has historic value.
- There is a grave marker approximately 500 feet (150 m) northwest of main house. It is located on a knoll overlooking the valley and the ranch. It is a separate part of the historic district, covering less than .1 acres (0.00040 km^{2}). The headstone is inscribed: "Here lies Bill Vickers and J. Gruenke, Shot August 14, 1887". The details regarding the circumstances of these men's deaths are unknown.
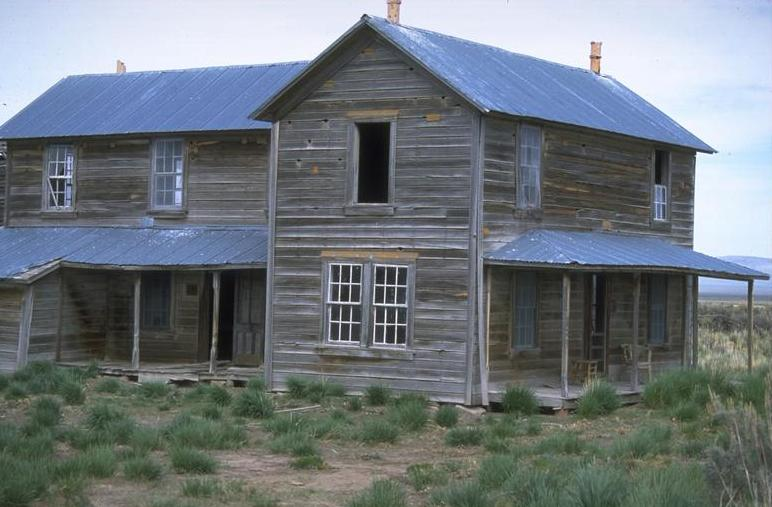
* Main house

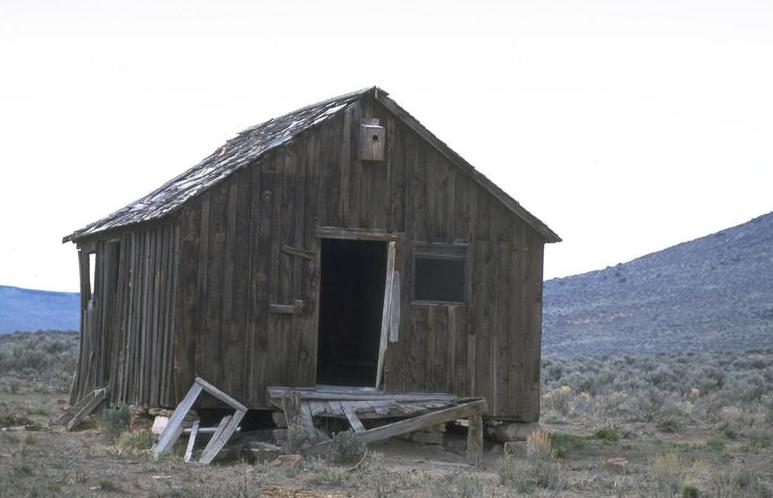
* Bunkhouse #2

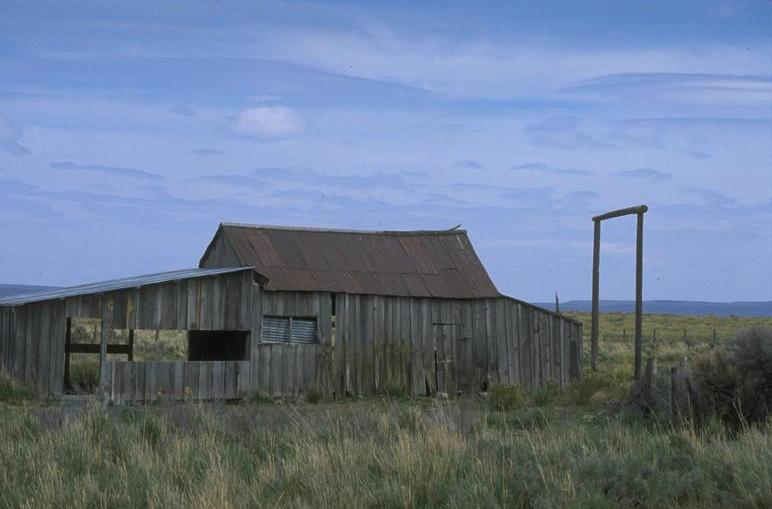
* Blacksmith shop

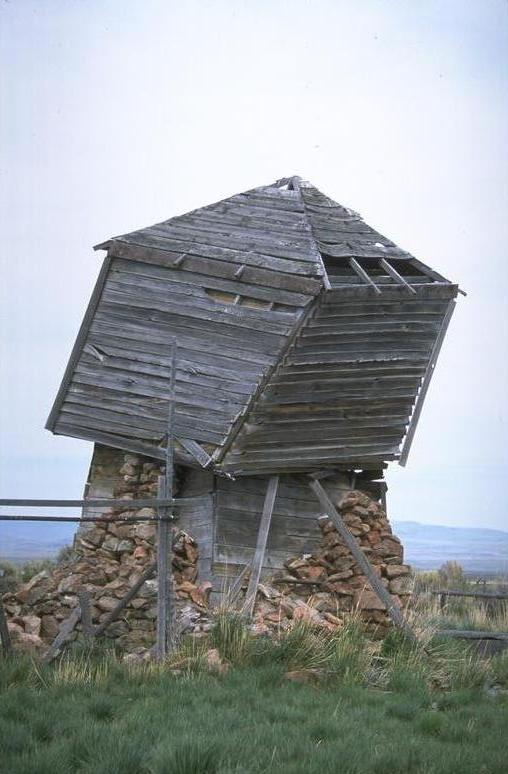
* Water tower

The remaining historic structures are in such poor condition the Bureau of Land Management listed them as non-contributing elements when the Shirk Ranch site was nominated for the National Register of Historic Places. They include a caved-in root cellar, a collapsed barn, the remains of a rock-clad shed, and an old ranch house ruin.

- The root cellar was constructed about 1910. It is located west of the main house, between the first bunkhouse and the woodshed. It is dug into ground with a footprint of approximately 11 feet (3.4 m) by 15 feet (4.6 m). It is accessed by wooden stairway. Boards are nailed to ten below ground level posts to keep earth out of the cellar. The roof has a heavy 1og ridge pole with simple lumber planking covered with earth. By 1985, the roof had already collapsed.
- The barn was probably built around 1910. Its ruins are located approximately 550 feet southwest of the main house. The barn was 47 feet (14 m) wide and 112 feet (34 m) long. By 1985, the barn was partially collapsed and had no roof left. The remaining structure included vertical plank walls fixed to large juniper posts which only remained at the north end of the building. The structure originally had mortise and tenon joints to hold up the loft. There was a large door opening at the end that was still standing.
- The stone-clad shed was built in the 1880s. It is located at the southwest corner of the site, some distance from the other historic structures. It was a one-story structure, measuring 8 feet (2.4 m) by 15 feet (4.6 m). It was constructed with common lumber sheathed with dry-stacked stones. The door on the east side was framed with rough-cut lumber and juniper posts. The shed had no windows. In 1985, the shed was in very poor condition with the exterior stone wall partially collapsed.
- The ruins of the original 1881 ranch house are located approximately 200 feet (61 m) west of the main house. In 1985, the only remaining part of the original house was the ruin of a stone fireplace. All that remained was a number of large stones that formed the hearth and walls of the fireplace encased with dry-stacked rubble.

There is only one non-historic structure on the site, an animal feed lot located at the southern end of the ranch complex. It was built in 1980 for modern ranch operations at the site. While it does not have any historic significance, the Bureau of Land Management has decided not to remove the structure since it is isolated from all of the contributing historic structures.

== Location ==
The Shirk Ranch Historic District is located on Bureau of Land management property in southeastern Oregon. The historic district covers 14.5 acres (0.059 km^{2}). The ranch is in Oregon's high desert county at an elevation of approximately 5,200 feet (1,600 m) above sea level.

The Shirk Ranch is approximately 68 miles (109 km) east of Lakeview, Oregon. It is reached by traveling east from Lakeview on Oregon Route 140 for 52 miles (84 km), then turning north on Bureau of Land Management Road 6106 and following it for 12 miles (19 km). The historic Shirk Ranch is on the right side of the road.
