= Stone stripe =

Type of rock formation

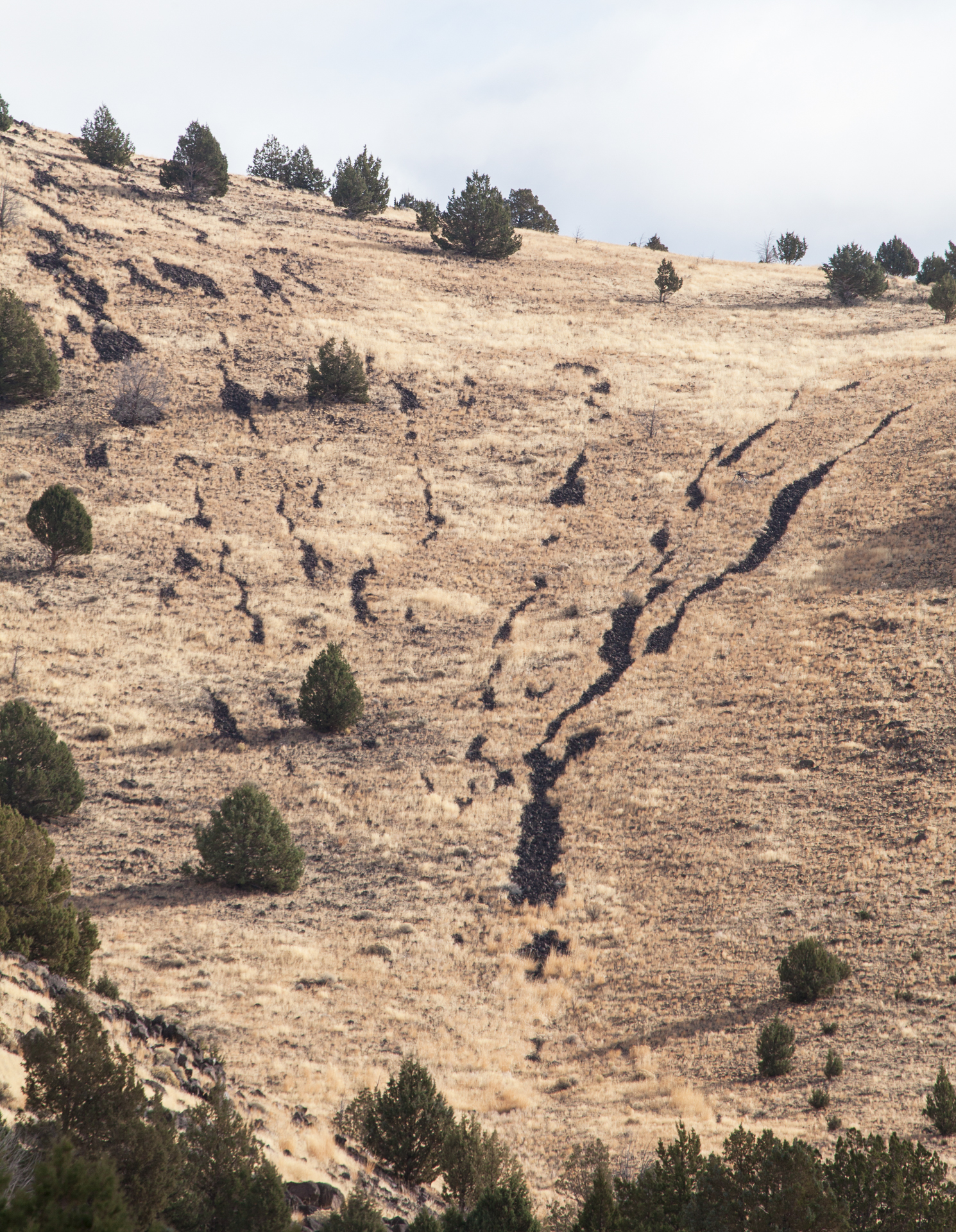
Stone stripes on Catlow Rim in Oregon

A stone stripe, also called a lava stringer, is an elongated concentration of mostly talus-like basalt rock found along a hillside or the base of a cliff. Many stone stripes occur without cliffs. A stone stripe is identified by its lack of vegetative cover. They typically occur in north central Oregon and develop at 900 to 1,100 meter elevations. Lengths can range from only a few meters to over 150 meters, and widths measure from .3 to 3 meters. Depths of the stone stripes range from 20 to 65 centimeters.

== Formation ==
Stone stripes are thought to have been originally created by periglacial conditions of the Quaternary period during an Ice age. It is likely their formation originates from multiple processes including frost action, surface erosion, eluviation, and mass wasting. However, it is likely that intense freeze and thaw cycles account for the natural sorting of the rock debris within a stone stripe, and also accounts for the shallow depth of the stripes, since frost penetration is thought to not penetrate deeper than 1 meter in the region.

Stone stripes are also found surrounding soil mounds of central Oregon which also owe their formation to freeze and thaw cycles. They are called stone rings and form on more level terrain. As the terrain increases in slope, stone rings transition into stone stripes.

== Gallery ==
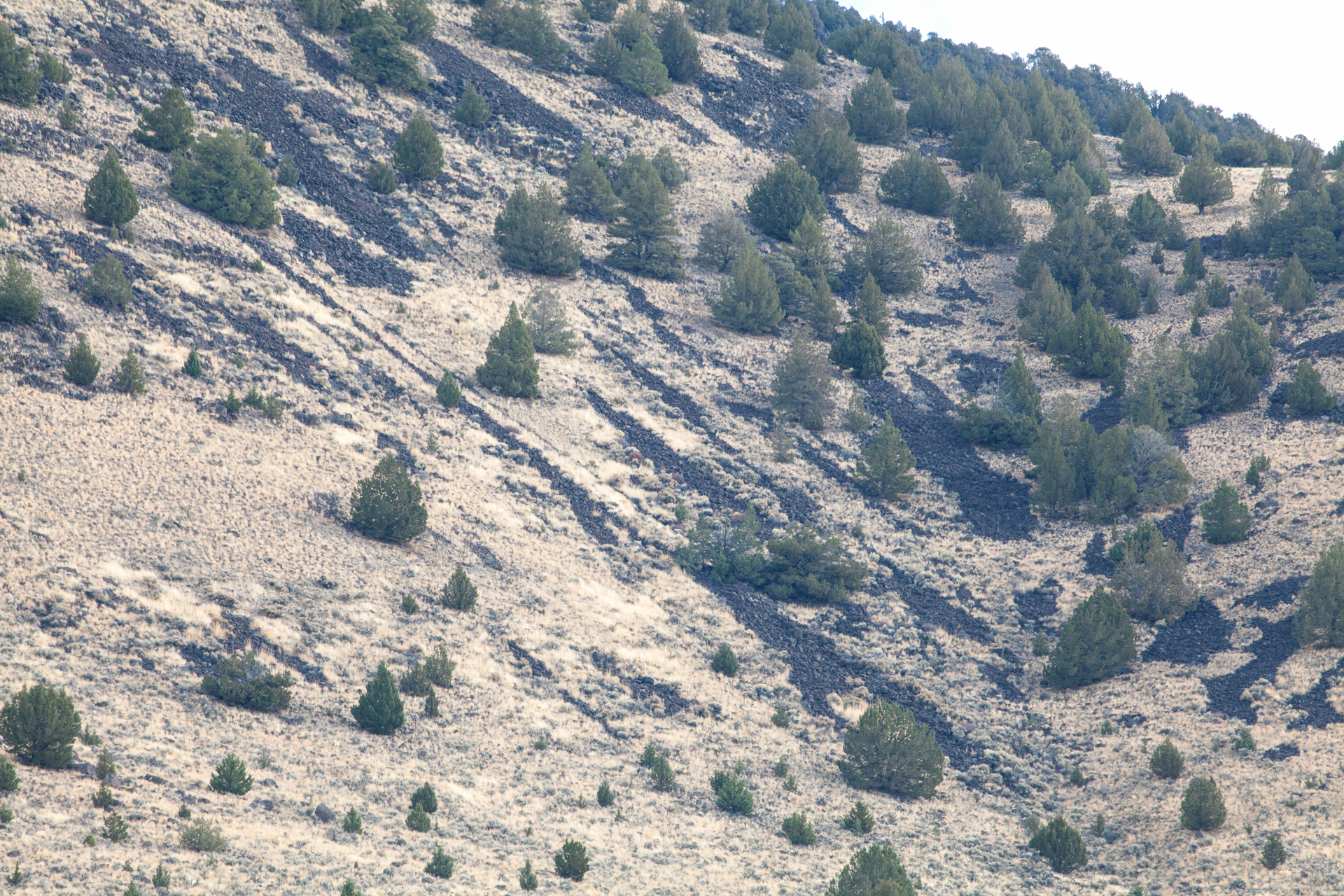
Stone stripes on Catlow Rim with juniper trees.

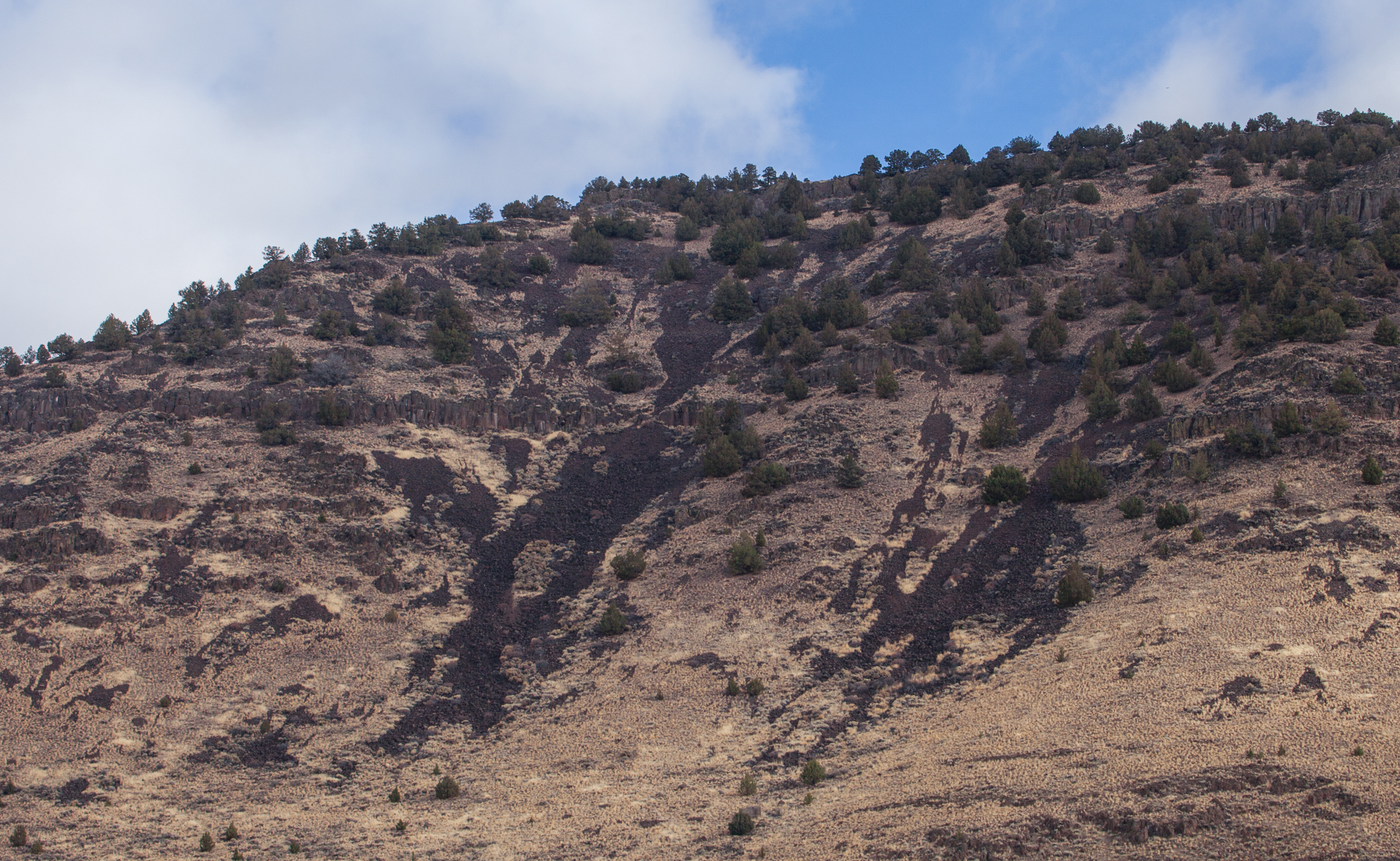
Stone stripes on Catlow Rim.

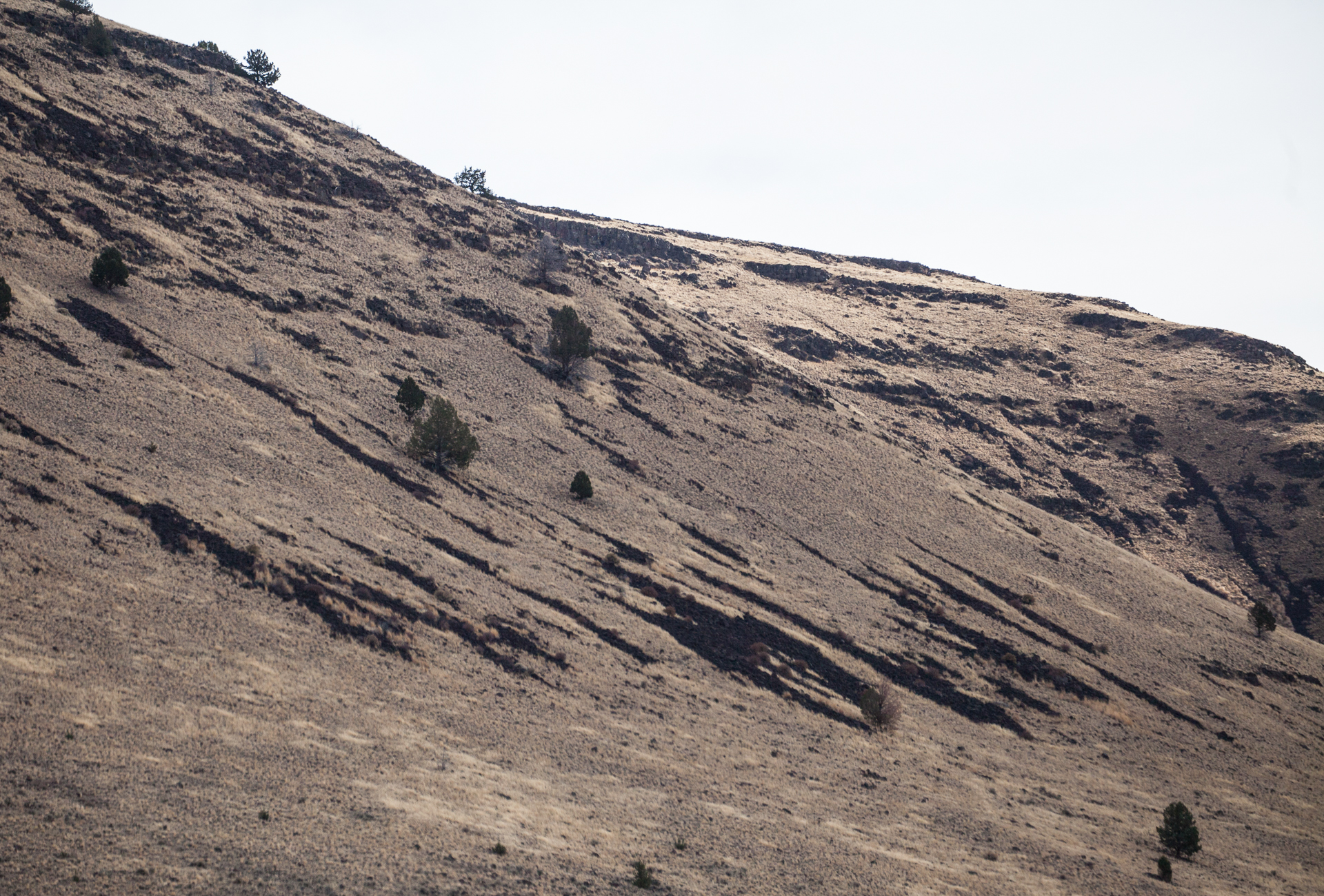
Stone stripes on Catlow Rim.

== See also ==
- Mima mounds
