= Charles Catlow =

English cricketer

Personal information
- Full name: Charles Stanley Catlow
- Born: 21 February 1908; Darwen, Lancashire, England
- Died: 7 March 1986 (aged 78); Northampton, Northamptonshire, England
- Batting: Right-handed

Domestic team information
- Years: Team
- 1929: Northamptonshire

Career statistics
Competition	First-class
Matches	2
Runs scored	18
Batting average	9.00
100s/50s	–/–
Top score	10*
Balls bowled	–
Wickets	–
Bowling average	–
5 wickets in innings	–
10 wickets in match	–
Best bowling	–
Catches/stumpings	–/–
- Source: Cricinfo, 17 November 2011

Charles Stanley Catlow (21 February 1908 – 7 March 1986) was an English cricketer. Catlow was a right-handed batsman. He was born in Darwen, Lancashire.

Catlow made two first-class appearances for Northamptonshire in 1929, one against Oxford University and the other against the touring South Africans. In the match against Oxford University at the Ideal Clothiers Ground, he scored 10 not out in Northamptonshire's first-innings batting at number six. In their second-innings he was promoted to open the batting, though without success as he was dismissed for a duck by Charles Hill-Wood, with Oxford University winning by an innings and 121 runs. Against the South Africans at the County Ground, he scored 8 runs in Northamptonshire's only innings, before being dismissed by Sandy Bell. The match ended in a draw.

He died in Northampton, Northamptonshire on 7 March 1986.
