= Blitzen, Oregon =

Unincorporated community in the state of Oregon, United States

- Unincorporated community
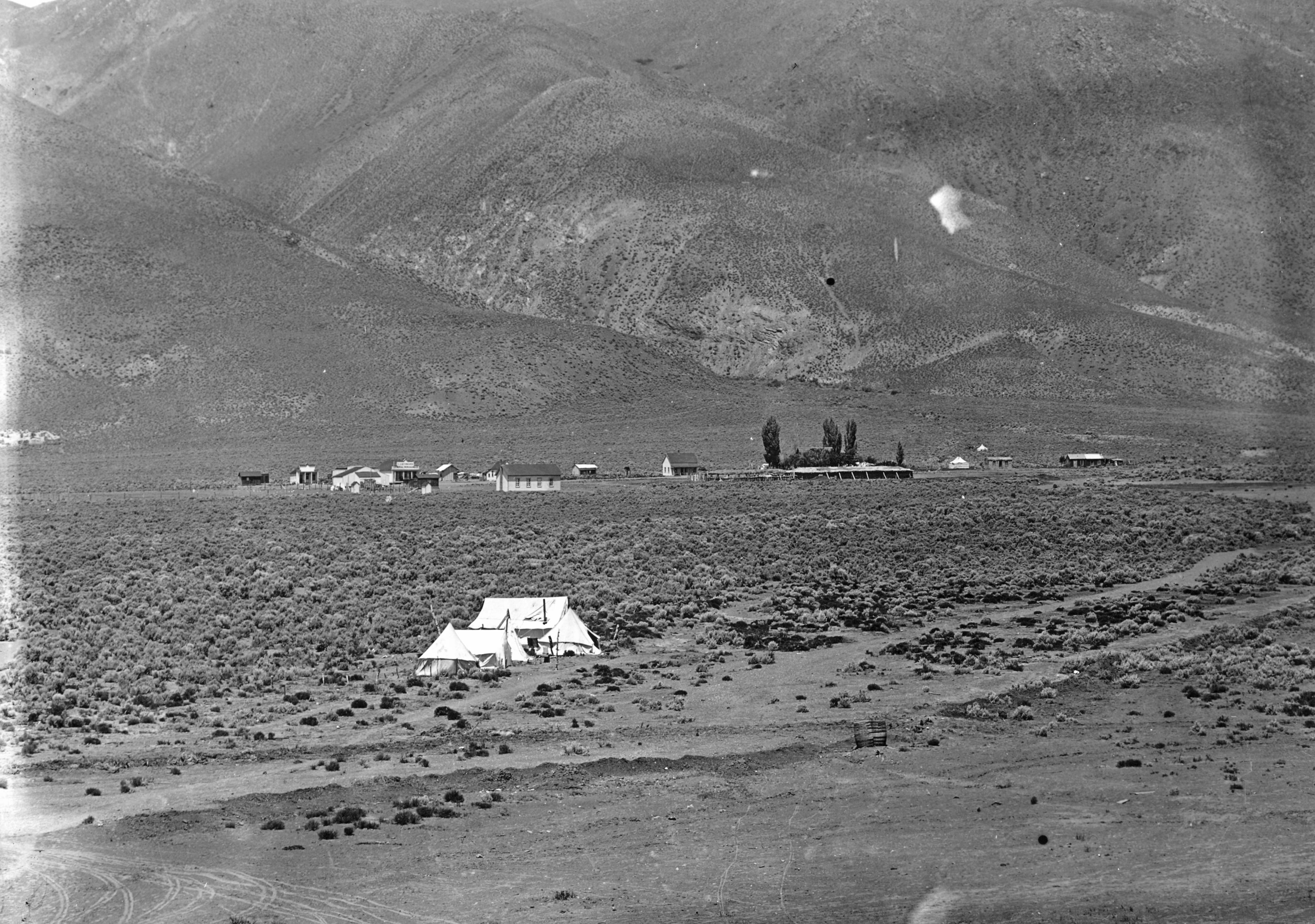
- The town of Blitzen

- Location within Oregon Location within the United States
- Coordinates: 42°36′53″N 119°04′10″W
- Country: United States
- State: Oregon
- County: Harney
- Established: 1916
- Elevation: 4,576 ft (1,395 m)
- Time zone: UTC-8 (Pacific (PST))
  - Summer (DST): UTC-7 (PDT)
- ZIP codes: 97721
- GNIS feature ID: 1117817

Blitzen is a ghost town in the Catlow Valley of southern Harney County, Oregon.

== History ==
It appears that at some point a post office named Blitzen was established about 10 miles south of Narrows, and named for the Donner und Blitzen River, which flowed nearby. Another post office was established in another town called Blitzen on April 10, 1915. A Mr. Stewart served as the first postmaster, and the town's population gradually declined; there were only three families left in Blitzen in 1924. The Blitzen post office continued to operate as a small rural delivery site until it was closed in February 1943. Today, there is no evidence of habitation at any of these sites except at the ghost town of Blitzen, where there are still a few deteriorated buildings at the town site, which is now located on the large Roaring Springs Ranch.
