= Catlow Valley =

Basin in Oregon, United States

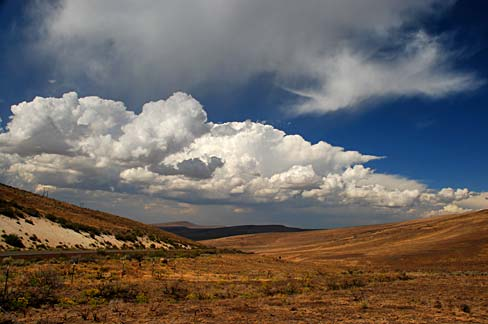
- The Catlow Valley from Catlow Valley Road

- Location within Oregon
- Floor elevation: 4,554 ft (1,388 m)
- Length: 50 mi (80 km) north–south
- Width: 30 mi (48 km) east–west
- Area: 1,300 mi^{2} (3,400 km^{2})

Geography
- Country: United States
- State: Oregon
- Region: Basin and Range Province
- County: Harney
- Borders on: Hart Mountain; Steens Mountain; Catlow Rim
- Coordinates: 42°33′49″N 119°03′30″W
- Interactive map of Catlow Valley

The Catlow Valley is a basin in Harney County, Oregon, United States. It is a remote valley at the northwestern corner of North America's Basin and Range Province. The valley is named after a pioneer rancher, John Catlow. The area was used by Native Americans for thousands of years before European explorers arrived in the 19th century. Today, cattle ranching is the main commercial activity in the valley. The public land in the Catlow Valley is administered by the Bureau of Land Management. This public land offers a number of recreational opportunities including hiking, hunting, fishing, bird watching, and wildlife viewing.

== Geography ==
Catlow Valley is located in Harney County in southeastern Oregon. The area is the northwestern corner of North America's continental basin and range country. The valley is approximately 50 miles (80 km) long and 30 miles (48 km) wide. It covers approximately 1,300 square miles (3,400 km^{2}) of high desert range land. The average elevation of the valley floor is 4,500 feet (1,400 m) above sea level.

The Catlow Valley is bounded by Hart Mountain on the west and Steens Mountain on the east, and Beatys Butte is southwest of the valley. Warner Peak is the highest point on Hart Mountain. The summit of Warner Peak is 8,012 feet (2,442 m) above sea level. From the crest of the Hart Mountain, the land slopes gently down to the floor of the valley. Steens Mountain's western boundary is Catlow Rim. The rim runs along the east side of Catlow Valley from north to south. At the north end of the valley, the rim begins as gentle rolling hills. The rim gets steeper and high as it runs south. At the south end of the valley, Catlow Rim has a cliff face that rises more than a 1,000 feet (300 m) above the valley floor. Beatys Butte is a stand-alone peak southwest of Catlow Valley. Its summit is 7,918 feet (2,413 m) above sea level, which gives it a 3,400-foot (1,000 m) prominence above the valley floor.

== Geology ==
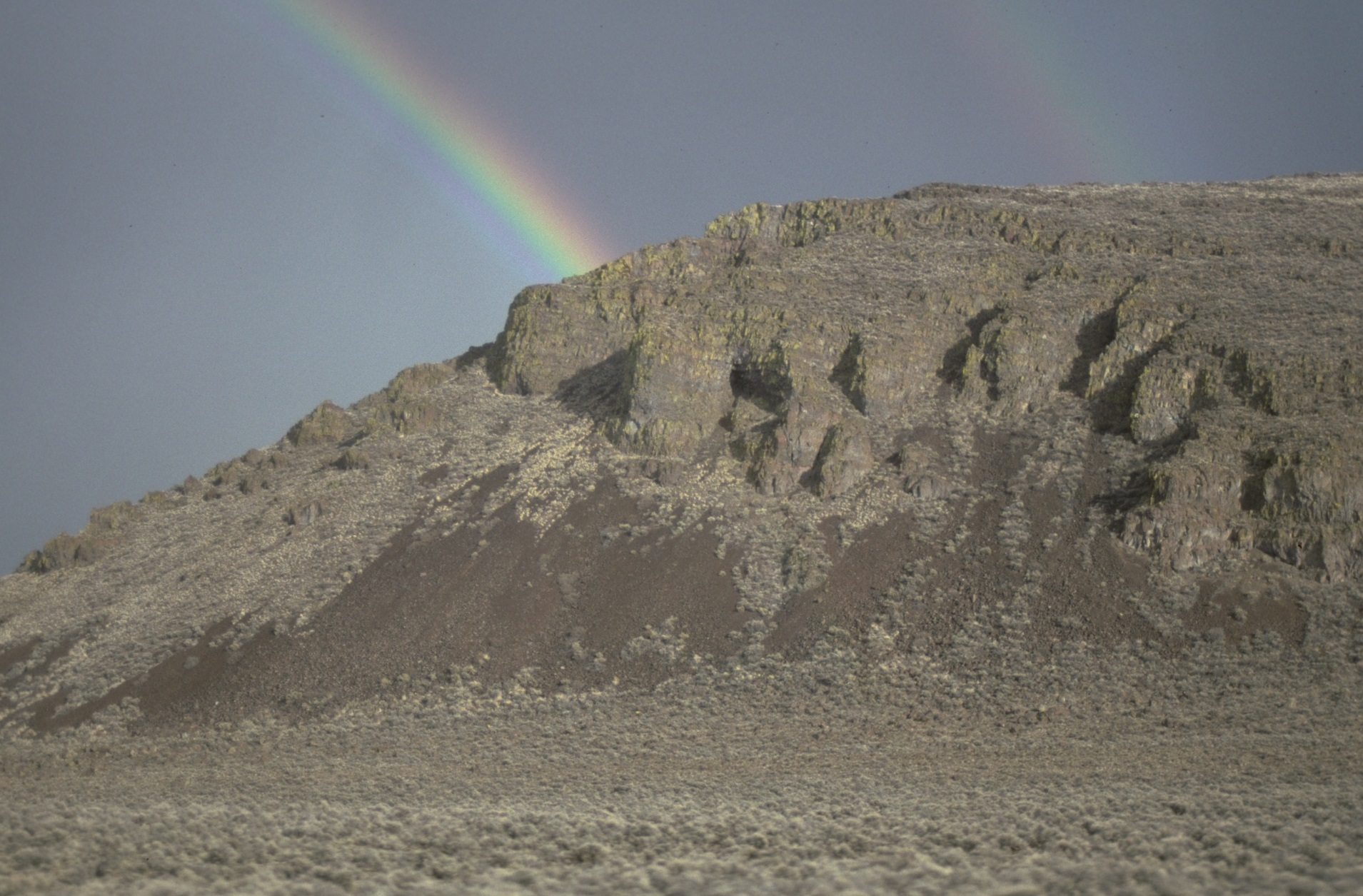
Rainbow over Catlow Rim escarpment

The Catlow Valley is a tectonic depression called a graben. It is bounded on the east and west by high, uplifted fault-block mountains—Hart Mountain to the west and Steens Mountain to the east—with which it forms a horst and graben geological feature. Catlow Rim is a prominent escarpment that forms the western face of the Steens Mountain fault block, overlooking the Catlow Valley. The rim is a basalt cliff that runs along the east side of the valley. Catlow Cave is located at the base of Catlow Rim near the southern end of the valley. The cave is 130 feet (40 m) wide at its mouth. It is 50 feet (15 m) high and 60 feet (18 m) deep. Roaring Springs Cave is another prominent cave located at the base of Catlow Rim.

During the Pleistocene Epoch, the Catlow Valley was covered by a single large lake, approximately 50 miles (80 km) by length and width. In some spots, the lake was over 250 feet (76 m) deep. Today, the valley is a high-desert alluvial basin. However, evidence of the ancient lake can still be seen in the form of shoreline erosion marks, gravel bars, and wave-cut terraces around the edge of the valley, especially along the base of Catlow Rim.

== Climate ==
The climate in the Catlow Valley is typical of the high-desert country of southeastern Oregon. Summers in the valley are short, characterized by high temperatures and very little moisture. The valley gets an average of 9 inches (23 cm) of precipitation per year, mostly as snowfall. The winters are cold.

Climate data for P Ranch Refuge, Oregon (the nearest weather station to the Catlow Valley)
Month	Jan	Feb	Mar	Apr	May	Jun	Jul	Aug	Sep	Oct	Nov	Dec	Year
Mean daily maximum °F (°C)	41.4 (5.2)	46.7 (8.2)	55.2 (12.9)	61.4 (16.3)	68.0 (20.0)	76.5 (24.7)	87.2 (30.7)	86.6 (30.3)	78.5 (25.8)	66.2 (19.0)	49.7 (9.8)	41.3 (5.2)	63.2 (17.3)
Daily mean °F (°C)	31.2 (−0.4)	34.4 (1.3)	41.2 (5.1)	46.3 (7.9)	52.7 (11.5)	59.5 (15.3)	66.8 (19.3)	65.2 (18.4)	57.2 (14.0)	48.7 (9.3)	37.0 (2.8)	29.9 (−1.2)	47.5 (8.6)
Mean daily minimum °F (°C)	20.9 (−6.2)	22.1 (−5.5)	27.1 (−2.7)	31.2 (−0.4)	37.4 (3.0)	42.5 (5.8)	47.3 (8.5)	43.8 (6.6)	36.0 (2.2)	31.3 (−0.4)	24.4 (−4.2)	18.5 (−7.5)	31.9 (−0.1)
Source: National Oceanic and Atmospheric Administration, National Climatic Data Center normals data, 1981–2010

There is no official weather reporting station in the Catlow Valley. The P Ranch weather station is the nearest official National Oceanic and Atmospheric Administration (NOAA) reporting station to the valley. It is approximately 5 miles (8.0 km) northeast of the Catlow Valley in the neighboring Blitzen Valley. The elevation of the P Ranch weather station is 4,210 feet (1,280 m) above sea level, approximately 300 feet (91 m) lower than the average elevation of the Catlow Valley. It reports daily weather data to NOAA's National Climatic Data Center.

== Ecology ==
=== Flora ===
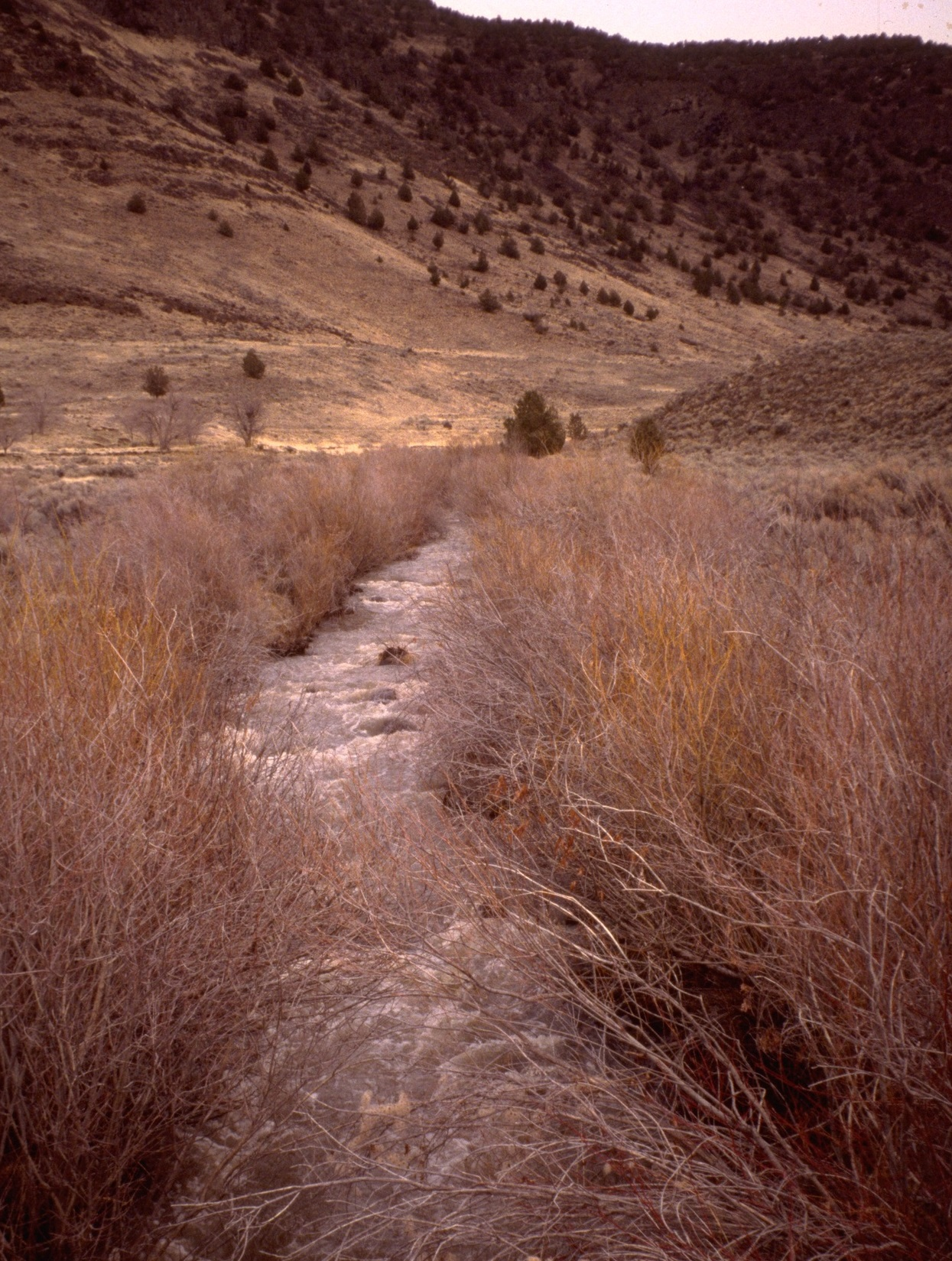
Home Creek riparian area

The Catlow Valley topography provides a number of wildlife habitats. These include seasonal lakes, marshes, riparian areas, grasslands, sage steppe, dry juniper forests, and rimrock. The valley is predominantly high-desert grassland with gently rolling hills to the north, west, and south of the valley floor. There are wetlands and meadows at the mouth of canyons where runoff from Hart Mountain and Steens Mountain drains into the valley. There are two major drainages from Hart Mountain on the west side of the valley, Rock Creek and Guano Creek. Rock Creek enters the valley from the northwest, and Guano Creek flows in from the southwest. The east side of the valley is bounded by Catlow Rim, a steep and rugged cliff. The rim is cut by canyons that channel runoff into small man-made reservoirs and shallow natural marshes along the edges of the valley floor. The three main drainages on the east side of the valley are Home Creek, Threemile Creek, and Skull Creek. On the east side of the valley, Catlow Rim provides a rimrock habitat. Some of the east slope of Hart Mountain and the west slope of Steens Mountain are lightly covered with western juniper. There are also aspen trees in areas where winter snow tends to accumulate, as well as a ponderosa pine grove in one area on Hart Mountain.

The dominant vegetation throughout most of the valley is big sagebrush, low sagebrush, rabbitbrush, and bitterbrush. Common grasses include bluebunch wheatgrass, bunchgrass, and Idaho fescue. In addition, greasewood, shadscale, spiny hopsage, winterfat, and basin wildrye can be found in parts of the valley.

=== Fauna ===
The Catlow Valley's wildlife includes many high-desert animal species. Large mammals found in the valley include mule deer, pronghorn, bighorn sheep, coyotes, bobcats, and cougars. The valley is also home to a herd of wild horses. Smaller mammals include badgers, jackrabbits, antelope squirrels, least chipmunks, bushy-tailed woodrats, desert woodrats, Great Basin pocket mice, canyon mice, and long-eared myotis bats. Among the common reptiles are Great Basin fence lizards, sagebrush lizards, desert horned lizards, western skinks, gopher snakes, and western rattlesnakes.

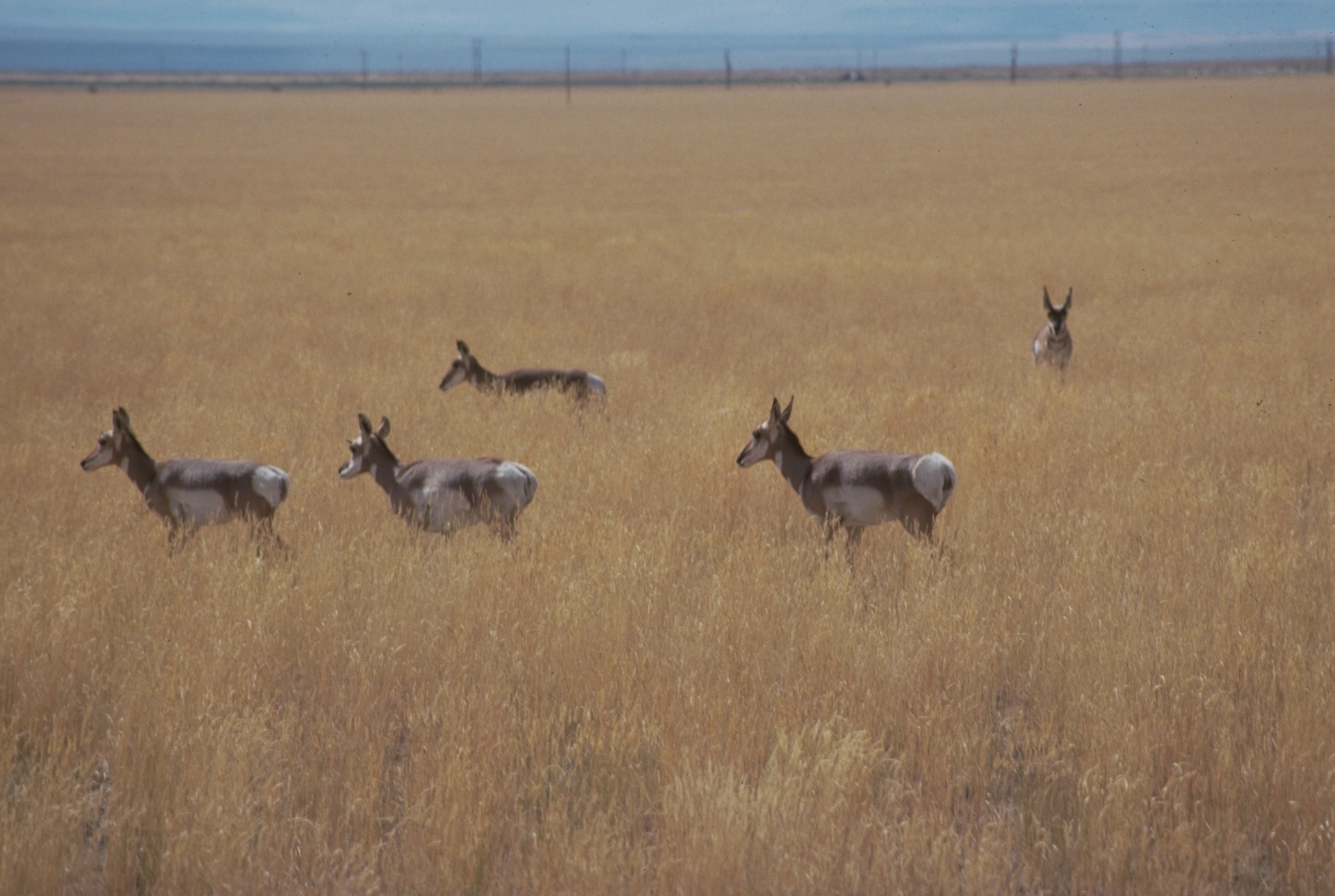
Pronghorn in a Catlow Valley field

In the sage steppes and grasslands of the Catlow Valley, resident birds include horned larks, Brewer's sparrows, vesper sparrows, sage thrashers, sagebrush sparrows, black-throated sparrows, common ravens, and greater sage grouse. The valley also hosts mountain chickadees, Cassin's finches, black-headed grosbeaks, green-tailed towhees, yellow-rumped warblers, MacGillivray's warblers, mountain bluebirds, white-headed woodpeckers, California quail, mourning doves, magpies, burrowing owls, flammulated owls, and northern harriers. In the valley's riparian areas, dusky flycatchers, yellow warblers, orange-crowned warblers, house wrens, and spotted towhees are common in the summer months. In the rimrock, there are chukars, white-throated swifts, cliff swallows, and barn swallows. The larger birds include great horned owls, long-eared owls, prairie falcons, American kestrels, red-tailed hawks, and golden eagles.

All five of the year-round creeks that flow into the Catlow Valley (Rock Creek, Guano Creek, Home Creek, Skull Creek, and Threemile Creek) support fish populations. The native fish are tui chub and Great Basin redband trout. The creeks also host introduced populations of rainbow trout and Lahontan cutthroat trout. Redband trout and tui chub are abundant and well-distributed throughout the Rock Creek habitat. In Home Creek, the redband distribution and abundance are moderate; portions of the habitat are degraded. The redband populations in Guano, Skull, and Threemile creeks are limited. In addition, degraded parts of the Threemile Creek habitat include Threemile Reservoir.

== History ==
=== Early history ===
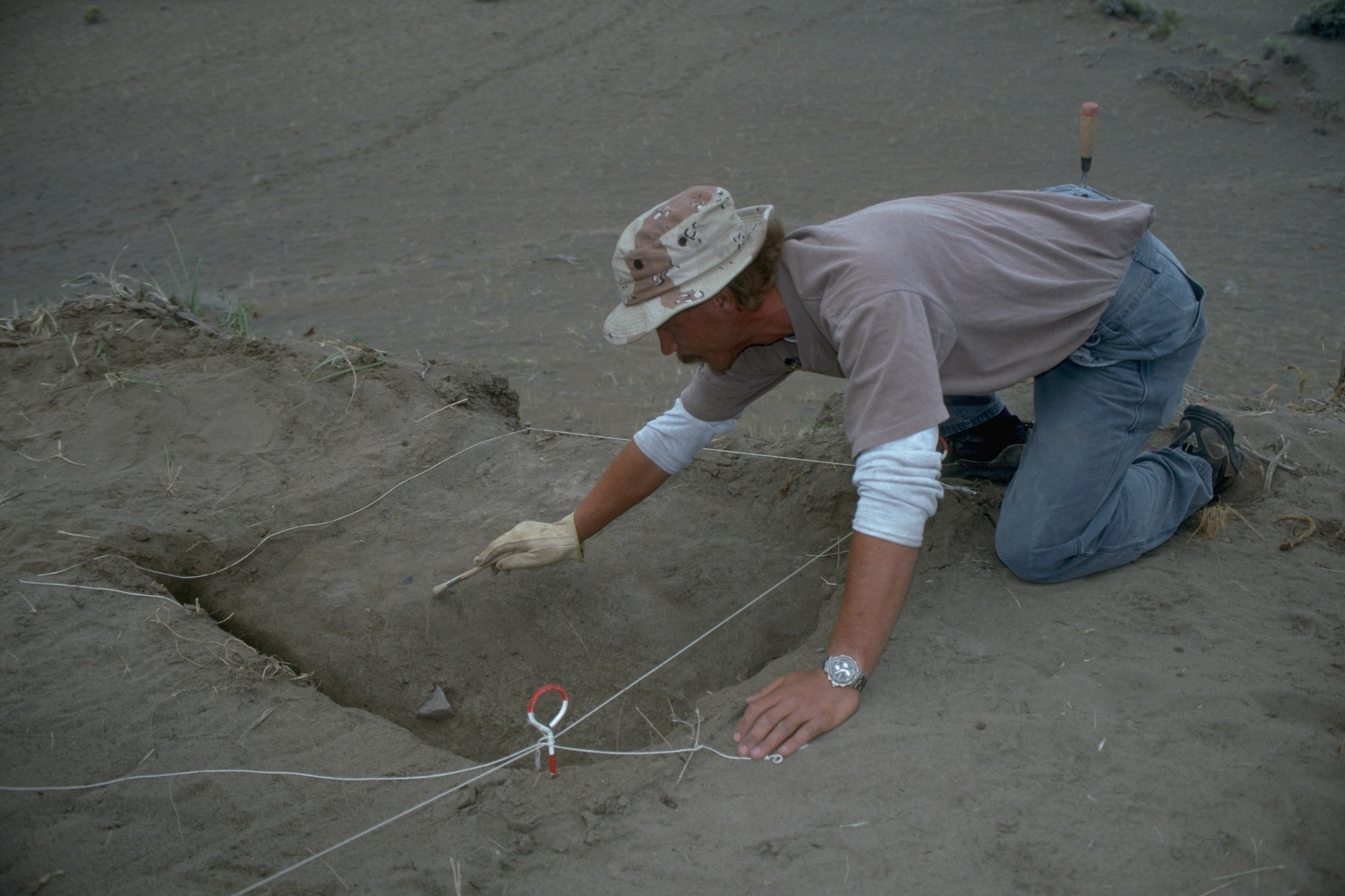
Skull Creek dunes archaeological site

Native Americans used the Catlow Valley for thousands of years before the first European explorers arrived. The valley has a number of petroglyph sites. Some of these petroglyphs may be up to 12,000 years old. When he first excavated Catlow Cave in 1934, archaeologist Luther S. Cressman found evidence of Native American habitation dating back to the Paleo-Indian period (8,000 to 12,000 years ago) as well as artifacts from the Early Archaic period (6,000 to 8,000 years ago). Cressman identified four rock fire pits and other housekeeping features within Catlow Cave. Later excavations found stone tools, baskets, woven mats, sandals, rope, and fragments of leather. The Skull Creek dunes are another archaeological site that provides evidence of early Native American habitation in the Catlow Valley. That site documents at least 8,000 years of occupation. Prior to the arrival of white settlers, the Catlow Valley area was occupied by the Northern Paiute people.

=== 19th century ===
The first European explorer to enter the valley may have been John Work, who headed a Hudson's Bay Company trapping expedition that explored the area in 1831. While it is not certain that he visited the Catlow Valley, Work is known to have passed through the Steens Mountain area as well as the neighboring Warner Valley, west of Hart Mountain.

In 1864, Lieutenant Colonel Charles S. Drew of the 1st Oregon Cavalry passed just south of the Catlow Valley while on a long-range reconnaissance patrol for the United States Army. Drew named Beatys Butte in honor of Sergeant A. M. Beaty, one of the noncommissioned officers in his party.

In 1865, the United States Army decided that it needed a fort in southeastern Oregon to facilitate the interdiction of Indian raiding parties passing through the area. In 1866, a detachment from Fort Boise was sent to establish the fort. The soldiers arrived on the east side of Warner Valley in late summer. Unable to cross the valley's long chain of lakes and marshes, the soldiers built a winter camp on the east slope of Hart Mountain, overlooking the Catlow Valley. This outpost was called Camp Warner (later known as Old Camp Warner). The camp was sited poorly, and the men had a very difficult winter. In February 1867, General George Crook visited the outpost. Citing the camp's poor location, Crook ordered that the post be moved to the west side of the Warner Valley. When the new camp was finished in July 1867, Old Camp Warner was abandoned. Today, all that remains of Old Camp Warner is two military graves.

In 1865, the United States Congress authorized the construction of the Oregon Central Military Wagon Road from Eugene, Oregon, to Fort Boise in Idaho. Congress allowed the construction company to claim three sections of land for every mile of road built. As a result, road surveyors laid out a route designed to pass through as much well-watered land as possible. The route of the military road came through the Warner Valley, passed south of Hart Mountain through what is today the Hart Mountain National Antelope Refuge, and then east through the Catlow Valley. However, the road was little more than a trail, and it was rarely used.

Cattle ranchers began using the Catlow Valley in the latter part of the 19th century. The first to arrive was Peter French in 1872, locating one of his five ranches in the valley. Another cattle rancher, John Catlow, followed in 1874. Catlow never owned land in the valley, but he grazed cattle there in the mid-1870s. David Shirk, one of Catlow's foremen, named the valley after his boss. Shirk was soon joined by his brother, William. In 1876, the two Shirk brothers established a ranch in the Catlow Valley, near water sources around Home and Threemile creeks. This put the Shirk brothers at odds with French, who already controlled much the valley's water. In 1889, David Shirk killed one of French's ranch hands in a dispute over water rights. While a jury decided it was self-defense, the Shirk brothers moved their main ranch to a location south of Beatys Butte to minimize future conflict with French and his employees.

=== 20th century ===
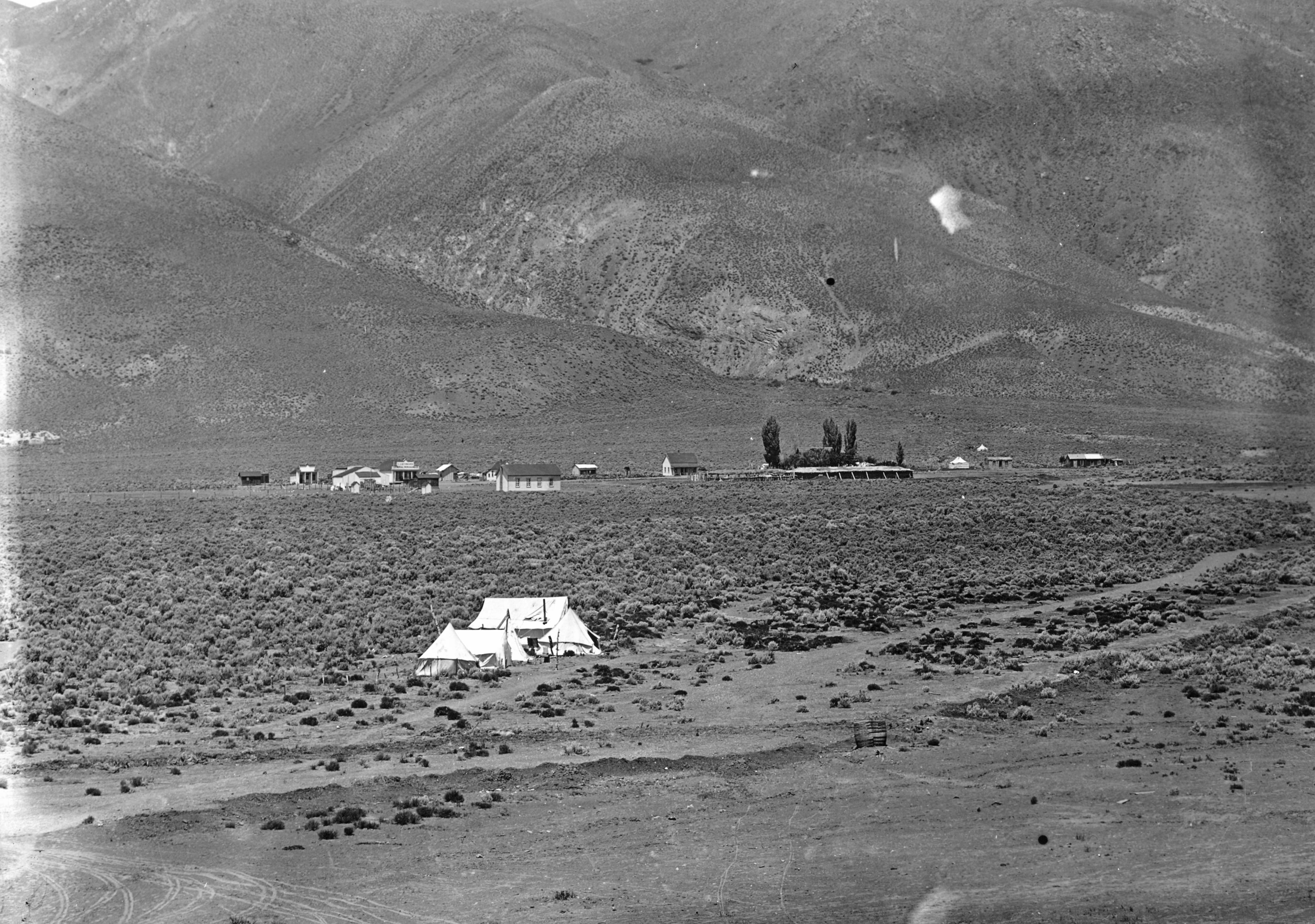
Unincorporated town of Blitzen

In the early 1900s, a surge of dry-land farmers arrived in the Catlow Valley. They were drawn by the prospect of free land offered by the federal government's Homestead Act. People's interest in the area was increased by newspaper articles promising that a railroad would soon be built through the valley. By 1916, there were over 700 settlers living in the Catlow Valley. To support these settlers, small unincorporated communities were established across the valley. These sites included Beckley, Delaine, Catlow, Berdugeo, Sageview, Tiara, and Blitzen. Most of these sites were little more than a general store with an attached post office.

Beckley was founded in 1911 as a single store. A post office was added the following year. The Beckley post office remained open for 14 years, closing in 1926. Delaine was located at the west edge of the valley on a lower slope of Hart Mountain, in Lake County. Its post office was opened in 1912, then closed exactly one year later. The Catlow post office was opened in 1914 and remained open until 1923. The Berdugo post office was opened near the Roaring Springs Ranch in 1915. It closed two years later. Sageview was located on the west side of the valley. A post office was the only building at the site. The post office was opened in 1916 and closed in 1918. The Tiara post office was open from May 1916 to January 1917.

The largest and oldest community in the Catlow Valley was Blitzen. Its post office was opened in 1916. However, there were only three families left in Blitzen in 1924. By 1928, there were fewer than 100 people living in the entire valley. The Blitzen post office continued to operate as a small rural delivery site until it was closed in 1943. Today, there is no evidence of habitation at any of these sites except at the ghost town of Blitzen, where there are still a few deteriorated buildings at the town site.

== Human activity ==
Today, there are no incorporated towns or unincorporated communities in the Catlow Valley, but only a few scattered ranches. Agriculture is the primary source of income for those living in the valley. Much of the private land in the valley is used to grow winter feed for local cattle herds. Wells provide groundwater for large irrigation circles and pipe irrigation systems in the valley. Because of the short growing season, the valley's principal crops are wild hay and alfalfa.

The largest ranch in the Catlow Valley is the Roaring Springs Ranch. It includes 260,000 acres (1,100 km^{2}) of deeded property plus grazing rights on an additional 800,000 acres (3,200 km^{2}) of public land. The ranch is located below Catlow Rim, where a large spring gushes from fissures in the rim wall. The spring feeds numerous ponds and meadows, providing habitat for wildlife as well as productive range land for cattle. The ranch has 20,000 acres (81 km^{2}) of irrigated meadow lands that produce 200 short tons (180 metric tons) of alfalfa each year. The ghost town of Blitzen is located on property owned by the ranch. In 2007, the Roaring Springs Ranch won the Environmental Stewardship Award sponsored by the National Cattlemen's Beef Association and the United States Department of Agriculture.

All of the public land in the Catlow Valley is administered by the Bureau of Land Management (BLM). These public lands offer a number of recreational opportunities including hiking, hunting, fishing, bird watching, wildlife viewing, photography, and camping. Among the most popular game animals for hunters are mule deer, pronghorn, and chukars. Several of the canyon streams that flow into the valley offer the opportunity for trout fishing. There are no developed campgrounds in the valley; however, dispersed camping is allowed on land administered by the BLM. The availability of potable water is a limiting factor for both day-use visitors and campers.

== High Desert Discovery Scenic Byway ==
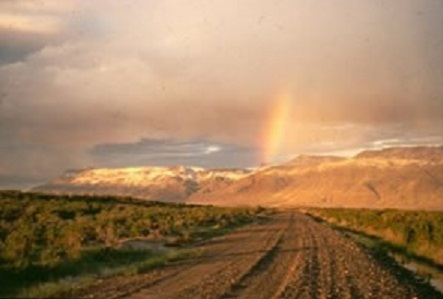
Frenchglen-Hart Mountain Road

The nearest town to the Catlow Valley is Burns, Oregon, the county seat of Harney County. Burns is approximately 65 miles (105 km) north of the valley. To reach the Catlow Valley from Burns, follow the High Desert Discovery Scenic Byway south. The drive takes several hours. From Burns, travel east on Oregon Route 78 for 1.2 miles (1.9 km), then turn south on Oregon Route 205 toward Frenchglen. This highway crosses the Harney Basin, passing over The Narrows between Harney and Malheur lakes, and traverses the length of the Malheur National Wildlife Refuge to Frenchglen. Continue on Route 205 through the small unincorporated community of Frenchglen and over a low pass approximately 4 miles (6.4 km) into the northeast corner of the Catlow Valley.

Oregon Route 205 is the only paved road in the Catlow Valley. It follows Catlow Rim approximately 35 miles (56 km) before turning east towards Fields, located on the far side of Steens Mountain. The High Desert Discovery Scenic Byway ends at Fields.

The main east–west road through the Catlow Valley is a rough gravel road that connects to Route 205 at the north end of the valley. It is not part of the High Desert Discovery Scenic Byway. After crossing the valley, the road leads west to the Hart Mountain National Antelope Refuge, 41 miles (66 km) from the Route 205 junction. This road is not passable year-round; therefore, travelers should contact the local Bureau of Land Management office in Burns or the Hart Mountain National Antelope Refuge headquarters before taking it. There is no gas available along the road until the traveler reaches Plush, 24 miles (39 km) west the refuge headquarters. Plush is 40 miles (64 km) east of Lakeview. Lakeview is the nearest incorporated city west of the Catlow Valley.
