= Peter French =

American rancher (1849–1897)

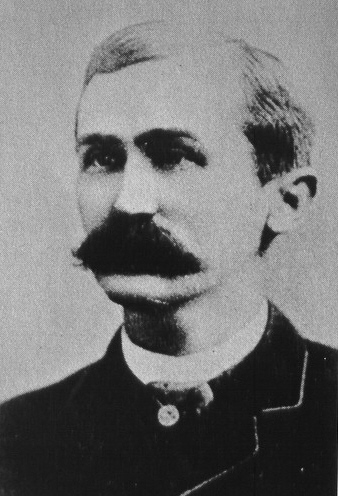
- Born: April 30, 1849; Missouri, United States
- Died: December 26, 1897 (aged 48); Frenchglen, Oregon, USA
- Occupation: Rancher

Peter French (April 30, 1849 – December 26, 1897) was an American rancher. The community of Frenchglen, Oregon, was partially named for him (a portmanteau of his surname and that of his employer, Dr. Hugh James Glenn).

== Early life ==
Peter French was born John William French in Missouri on April 30, 1849. In 1850, his father moved the family to Colusa County, California, a town located in the Sacramento Valley, to begin a small ranch. Finding there was not enough room for small ranch operations due to Spanish land grants, French's father uprooted his family once again and traveled north in the valley. French's father began a sheep ranch which became very successful; however, as French grew older, he found that the work was not exciting or challenging enough for him.

French moved southward to Jacinto, California, where he met and accepted employment as a horse breaker with Dr. Hugh James Glenn, a wealthy stockman and wheat baron. French was a quick learner and good worker, and in a few months he was promoted to foreman. The Spanish-speaking vaqueros liked and respected French, as he learned their language. At some point in his employment with Glenn, French assumed the name "Peter".

Glenn had expanded his assets as widely as possible in the area, and began to scout new areas for his profitable markets. In 1872, he sent French to Oregon with 1,200 head of Shorthorn cattle, a handful of vaqueros, and a Chinese cook. He ended up in southeastern Oregon to find vast grasslands amid the arid high desert.

Upon his arrival in the Catlow valley, French and his men came upon a poor prospector named Porter. Porter sold his small herd of cattle to French, and with the sale of his cattle went his squatter's rights to the west side of the Steens Mountain and his "P" brand. As French ventured further, he found the Blitzen Valley, where the Donner und Blitzen River snaked northward 40 miles (64 km) to Malheur Lake. This became his favorite spot, where he set up his base camp. He built shelters for his herd, line cabins, and bunkhouses for his men. Thus, the P Ranch was born.

== Cattle king ==
After several years, French's small cattle operation had expanded, helped in large part by Glenn as his financier. The P Ranch became the headquarters for his growing cattle empire. He and his men built fences, drained marshlands and irrigated large areas of land, broke hundreds of horses and mules, and cut and stacked native hay. French's empire expanded to include the Diamond Valley, the Blitzen Valley, and the Catlow Valley. The land encompasses approximately 160,000 to 200,000 acres (650 to 810 km^{2}). A shrewd businessman, French took advantage of the Swamp and Overflow Act, which allowed marshland to be purchased at $1.25 an acre. He built dams to flood areas, bought the land under the Swamp Act at the reduced price, then removed the dams to return the land to its original state. French also directed his employees and others to file homestead claims that he would then purchase. His attempts at seizing more and more land even included fencing lands in the public domain.

In 1883, French married Glenn's daughter Ella. Glenn was murdered three weeks later by a former employee. French continued to manage the Oregon operation for the Glenn family, selling more cattle to help pay the family's debts. In 1894, Glenn's heirs decided to incorporate the French-Glenn partnership into the French-Glenn Livestock Company, making French the company president. French was divorced in 1891.

In June 1878, the native Paiute and Bannock (both closely associated with the Shoshone tribes) population at the base of the Steens Mountain swooped upon the P Ranch, but not before a messenger could warn French of the impending attack. French and all but one of his men were able to escape. The attacks continued throughout the summer. The Paiutes burned buildings and homes, ran off cattle and horses, and at least once shot French's horse out from under him. At one point, French even accompanied the U.S. 1st Cavalry Regiment to guide the Army through the area.

In the 1880s and 1890s, stockmen and smaller farmers fought over land and water rights. Aggression over such rights and French's large spread of land drew a certain loathing toward him and his operation.

== Death ==
French was shot in the head on December 26, 1897, by Edward Lee Olivier. The bullet entered between French's right eye and right ear just below his temple and exited just behind the top of his left ear. He died instantly.

John William "Peter" French was buried in Red Bluff, California, next to the graves of his father and mother at the Oak Hill Cemetery.

== Trial of Edward Olivier ==
Olivier was initially charged with murder. He pleaded not guilty and was let out on $10,000.00 bail that was furnished by seven local supporters. The day before the trial was to begin, the charges were dropped. Supporters of French called the trial "fixed" however, the prosecution aimed for a lesser charge of Manslaughter to counter Olivier's claim of self-defense. The trial began May 18, 1898, in the Harney County Courthouse.

Olivier had been in a dispute with French for some time about an easement that would grant Olivier the legal right to cross through a piece of French's land to get to Olivier's home. Without an easement Olivier would be forced to increase his travel by over 6 miles (9.7 km). It had been reported that French made it a habit to punish Olivier for his supposed trespassing in humiliating fashion. He had quirted (whipped with a horse whip) Olivier in public at least 5 times. Lifelong rancher Alva Springer testified for the defense to French's public ridicule, "Here sits a little man who has nothing to say. You were in my field yesterday. Whenever the time comes right and I catch you there, I will fix you." Several others testified to witnessing French's public promise to "fix," even "shoot", Olivier if the opportunity is ever presented.

The state had called nearly twenty witnesses, seven of which were French employees and who witnessed the killing from varied distances. Their claims were more or less the same: Olivier was seen riding toward the gate that would have given him access to cross through French's land. French was at the gate working a cattle drive that day. Olivier was witnessed colliding horse to horse with French as French yelled at Olivier. French was seen swinging his hand the way one swings a whip although witnesses testified they did not actually see a whip perhaps because of the distance between them. Olivier continued westerly toward his home behind French as French had turned his horse around. Olivier drew his gun and pointed it at French's head. French ducked. Olivier lowered his gun and when French turned his head back to look at Olivier, Olivier raised his gun again and fired. French fell from his horse. Olivier stopped, looked down at French dead on the ground and rode away in the direction of his home.

Olivier's defense hinged on the purported belief that he feared that when French turned his head away, it was to buy time to draw a weapon and finally "fix" Olivier. French was not armed with a gun but was carrying his horse whip.

One of the seven witnesses that testified for the prosecution was Burt French, Pete French's brother, employee and resident of P Ranch. He testified "Never saw my brother strike Olivier with anything."

Over twenty witnesses testified to Olivier's defense. One was a man by the name of J. P. Kennedy who testified that he saw Burt French in Portland, OR, on January 2, 1898, little more than a week after Pete French was killed. Kennedy testified that Burt French told him, "I don't like to say anything against my brother, but I can't blame Olivier for doing as he did."

A jury found Olivier not guilty.

== Controversy ==
Accurate news reporting for happenings in southeastern Oregon were difficult then as now; the remoteness of the region lent itself to romanticization of the frontier lifestyle, particularly in the larger cities of the west coast.

A story published in the Oregonian newspaper in Portland on December 28, 1897, two days after French's killing read, "Peter French Dead - Shot and Killed by a Man Named Oliver reported to be a cold-blooded murder-affair occurred at Canyon City." An article published on 29 December in the San Francisco Chronicle read, "Killed as he fled from his assailant. How French was slain. Shot down on his own land while unarmed. The murderer escaped." On 30 December The Oregonian ran a story that said, "He [Olivier] is a man about 30 years of age, small of stature, and looks little like a criminal." On 29 December, the San Francisco Chronicle reported "French returned a few days ago from Chicago." This comports with the account in the book, Cattle Country of Peter French: "Peter French returned from a business trip to Chicago on Christmas Day of 1897. In Burns, he had Mart Brenton at the livery stable hook his team onto the buckboard, which was loaded with gifts he had brought for the children of his crew. He then drove directly to the Sod House Ranch. That night there was a Christmas Party, with all the children happy over the holiday and the men and women in a festive mood."

A local attorney in Burns, John W. Biggs, enjoyed telling the story of Pete French having Christmas Dinner with the Biggs' family the day before he was murdered. His daughter, Helen Biggs Rand, outs her father in her manuscript, A Few Recollections of Burns catalogued in the Harney County Library.

Conflicting accounts state that French returned to Harney County from Chicago by way of Omaha, Nebraska with William Hanley around the middle of December, 1897. In the December 15th, 1897, edition of the local newspaper, the Burns Times-Herald, it states, "Peter French was in town a few days this week on his way home from the east where he had been with beef cattle."

== See also ==
- Pete French Round Barn
