= Harney Lake =

Alkali lake basin in Oregon, US

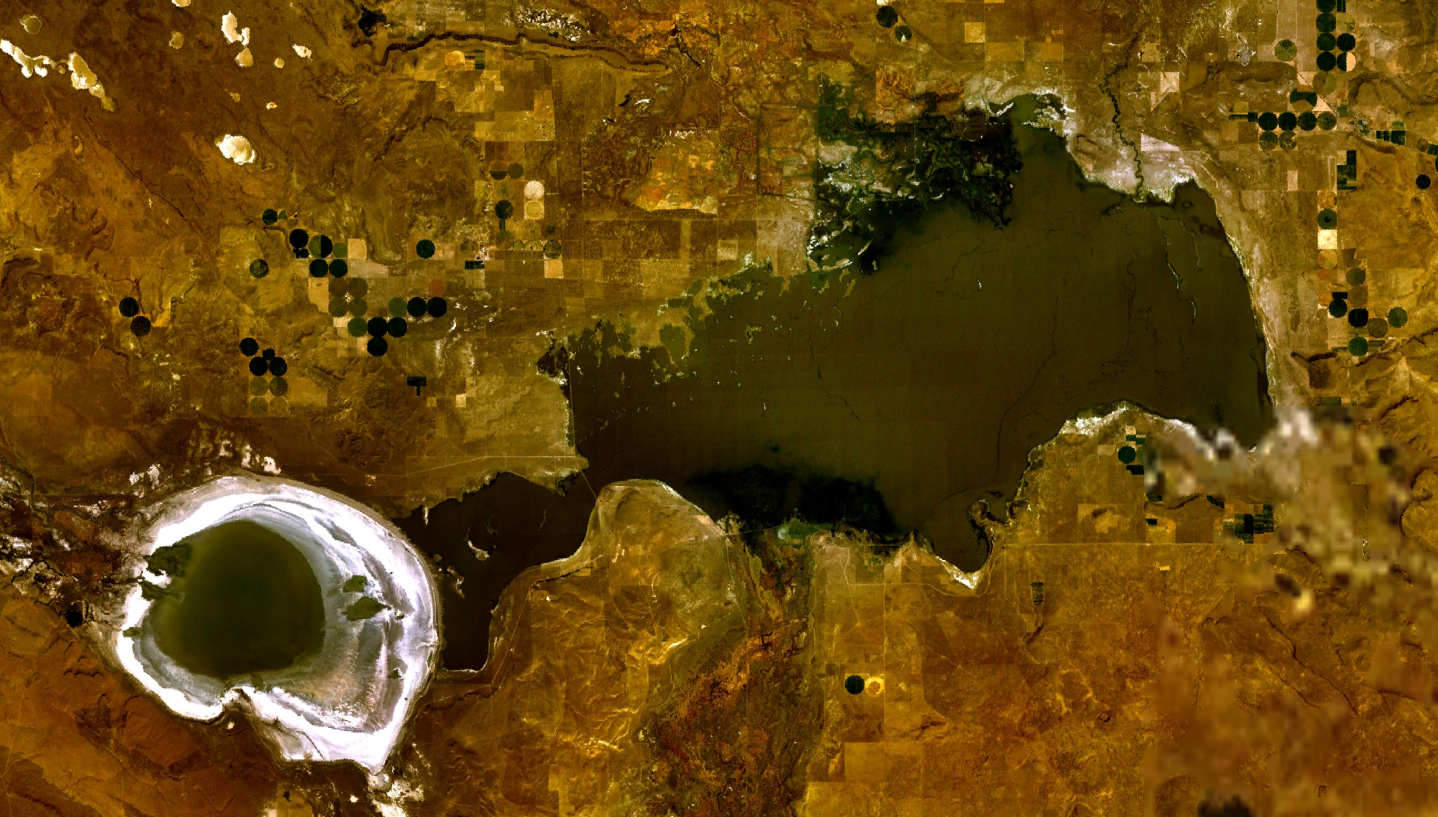
- Satellite image of Harney Lake (left) and Malheur Lake (right)

- Location within Oregon Location within the United States
- Location: Harney County, Oregon, United States
- Coordinates: 43°14′13″N 119°06′32″W
- Type: alkali lake
- Catchment area: 5,125 mi^{2} (13,270 km^{2})
- Basin countries: United States
- Surface area: 26,400 acres (107 km^{2})
- Shore length^{1}: 28 mi (45 km)
- Surface elevation: 4,084 ft (1,245 m)
- ^{1} Shore length is not a well-defined measure.

Harney Lake is a shallow alkali lake basin located in southeast Oregon, United States, approximately 30 miles (48 km) south of the city of Burns. The lake lies within the boundary of the Malheur National Wildlife Refuge and is the lowest point in the Blitzen Valley drainage.

== History ==
The lake has been known by several names, including Salt Lake in 1838, Tonowama, and Lake Harney.

Despite a history of 9,000 years of human inhabitation on Harney Lake by the Northern Paiute Indians primarily as nomadic wintering camps, little sign of modern human habitation is evident on Harney Lake. The nearest residents live in the community of Narrows.

== Water level ==
During wet years, the lake receives water from Malheur Lake, located approximately 10 miles (16 km) to the east. The depth of Harney Lake is less than 4 feet (1.2 m) during normal water years and has dried up completely during times of drought.

As typical to other alkali lake beds in the western United States, minimal aquatic life is found in Harney Lake. A species of inland brine shrimp is the only form of life in Harney Lake. Despite its limited food supply, the lake is part of an important inland marsh ecosystem for migratory birds in the arid southeast Oregon desert.

== Ecology ==
=== Malheur Lake Basin redband trout ===
Malheur and Harney lakes have reduced access by Great Basin redband trout due to irrigation diversions, channelization, draining of marshlands and high alkalinities. Even if trout could gain access again, redband populations would not survive in this marginal habitat. Harney Lake has been inhospitable to redband trout for many years due to high alkalinities. Today, redband trout in the Malheur Lakes Basin are widely distributed in small- and medium-size streams.

The redband is a unique subspecies adapted to the Malheur Lake Basin ecosystem. In these closed High Desert basins, redband trout have evolved to survive in environments with vast extremes of both water flow and temperature. They are one of only eight separate desert basin populations of interior native redband trout. The Malheur Lakes redband comprises 10 population groups in the closed interior basin of Harney and Malheur lakes. Historically, all streams were interconnected and these fish moved to the lakes and among population segments.

While not an officially designated threatened or endangered species, the Redband Trout is recognized as important resource, and this law sets aside land in Oregon for protection and research of Redband Trout. The Steens Mountains Cooperative Management and Protection Act of 2000 (Public Law 106–399)

== See also ==
- List of lakes in Oregon
