= Ideal Clothiers Ground =

Cricket ground in Wellingborough, England

Ground information
- Location: Wellingborough, Northamptonshire
- Establishment: 1929 (first recorded match)

Team information
Northamptonshire	(1929)
- As of 1 September 2010; Source: Ground profile

Ideal Clothiers Ground was a cricket ground in Wellingborough, Northamptonshire. The ground was constructed by Ideal Clothiers, a clothes making company based in Wellingborough. The first and only first-class match on the ground was in 1929, when Northamptonshire played Oxford University.

The ground fell out of use in the 1970s.
