= P Ranch =

- U.S. National Register of Historic Places
- U.S. Historic district
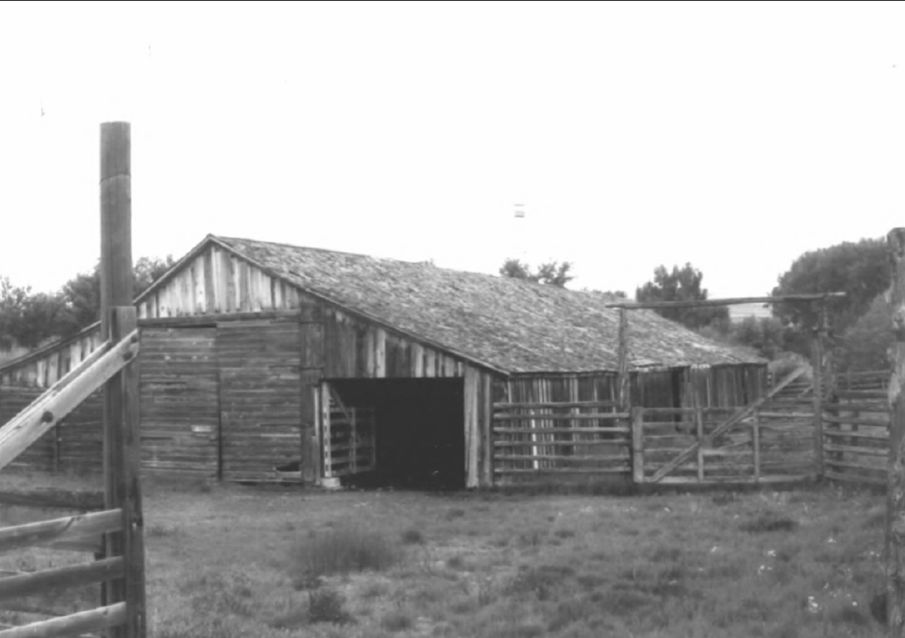
- Long Barn at the P Ranch, 1979

- Location within Oregon Location within the United States
- Location: Malheur National Wildlife Refuge
- Nearest city: Frenchglen, Oregon
- Coordinates: 42.827383°N 118.887144°W
- Built: ca. 1880s
- Architectural style: Simple post and beam
- NRHP reference No.: 79002060
- Added to NRHP: 1979

The P Ranch is a historic ranch in Harney County in southeastern Oregon, United States. The remaining ranch structures are located on the west bank of the Donner und Blitzen River in the Malheur National Wildlife Refuge. The ranch was built by Peter French, a well known 19th-century cattle baron. The P Ranch became headquarters for the French-Glenn Livestock Company, which eventually covered over 140,000 acres (570 km^{2}). After French was murdered in 1897, the French-Glenn Livestock Company slowly sold off the P Ranch property. In 1935, the United States Government purchased the remaining P Ranch property to add to an adjacent wildlife refuge. The Civilian Conservation Corps demolished most of the original ranch buildings in the 1930s, and a fire destroyed the main ranch house in 1947. The few remaining P Ranch structures are now listed on the National Register of Historic Places.

== Early history ==
Around 9,800 years ago, the Harney Basin was covered by a single great lake covering 255,000 acres (1,030 km^{2}). The birds, animals, and plants found in the wetland around the lake provided abundant food for early inhabitants. About 3,500 years ago, small villages began to develop around the lakes and along the banks of the river. Beginning about 1,400 years ago, extended droughts began to shrink the lake and surrounding wetlands.

While there are no records of the earliest people to inhabit the Harney Basin, Native Americans used the wetland areas around Malheur Lake, Harney Lake, and Donner und Blitzen River for thousands of years before the arrival of European settlers. By the time Europeans began to explore the area in the early nineteenth century, the Northern Paiute people were well established in the Harney Basin including the area that became the P Ranch.

Hudson's Bay Company fur trappers were the first Europeans to visit the Harney Basin. Peter Skene Ogden passed along the north shore of Malheur Lake in 1826. Other fur trapping expeditions followed in the 1830s. Several military expeditions passed through the area in the late 1850s. Major Enoch Steen was the first non-native to explore the Donner und Blitzen River area in 1860. Steens Mountain, that dominates southern Harney County, was named in his honor. In the 1860s, the United States Army established a number of military outposts in the Harney Basin.

== Peter French ==
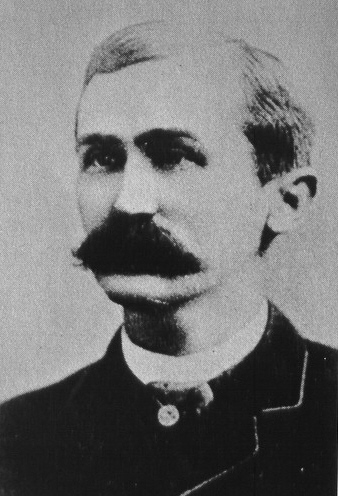
Peter French established the P Ranch

Peter French was born in Missouri in 1849. As a boy, he immigrated to California with his family. Then as a young man, French went to work for Doctor Hugh J. Glenn, who owned large tracts of land in the Sacramento Valley. In 1872, Glenn decided to expand his operation into Oregon. To lead the venture, Glenn picked 23-year-old Peter French. French was sent north with six vaqueros and 1,200 head of cattle.

When he arrived in the Blitzen Valley, French ran into a prospector named Porter, who had not found much gold and was eager to move on. French bought Porter's small heard of cattle along with his "P" brand and rights to the west slope of Steens Mountain where Porter had prospected. French settled along the Donner und Blitzen River. Over the next few years, French drained and fenced thousands of acres of wetlands along the river. That land became the P Ranch, which was named for the "P" brand acquired from Porter. By the 1870s, the P Ranch was earning a good income for Glenn. Cattle were raised in the lush P Ranch pastures along the river. In the fall, French drove his cattle 200 miles (300 km) to the railhead at Winnemucca, Nevada.

In 1883, French married Glenn's daughter Ella. Glenn was murdered three weeks later by a former employee. French continued to manage the Oregon operation for the Glenn family, selling more cattle to help pay the family's debts. In 1894, Glenn's heirs decided to incorporate the French-Glenn partnership into the French-Glenn Livestock Company, making French the company president.

From his base at the P Ranch, French expanded the company's holdings until the ranch extended from the foothills of Steens Mountain 40 miles (64 km) along both sides of the Donner und Blitzen River to Malheur Lake, including the entire south shore of the lake. It also covered all of neighboring Happy and Diamond valleys plus a large part of the Catlow Valley to the south. Eventually, the French-Glenn Livestock Company owned over 140,000 acres (570 km^{2}) of the Harney Basin. Some records indicate the ranch may have covered as much as 200,000 acres (810 km^{2}). The company built and maintained 500 miles (800 km) of barbed wire fence to protect 30,000 to 45,000 head of cattle plus 3,000 horses and mules. The operation had five divisions; the Happy Valley Division, the Diamond Division, Sod-House Division, the Catlow Valley Division, and the P Ranch Division. The P Ranch served as French's main headquarters in the center of the property.

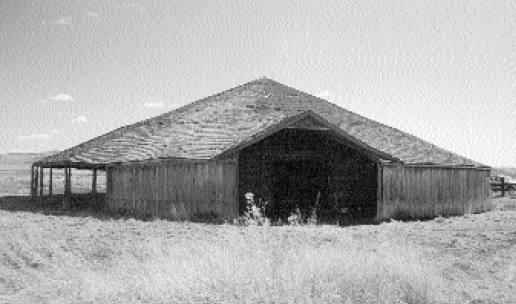
French's Round Barn was used to train horses.

French was not popular with new homesteaders in the area because he owned or controlled most of the water in the southern Harney Basin. His fences also made it difficult for some homesteaders to get to and from their property. On 26 December 1897, French was shot dead by a settler who had been unsuccessful in getting a road easement across French's property.

F.C. Lusk, who was the secretary of the French-Glenn Livestock Company prior to French's death, became executor of French's estate and took over as manager of the P Ranch and the company's other properties. To pay off company debts, Lusk gradually sold off ranch assets. In 1906, the P Ranch and the neighboring Diamond Ranch were sold to Henry L. Corbett and his partners his brother Elliott R. Corbett and C.E.S. Wood. In 1916, Louis F. Swift, owner of the Swift Meat Packing Company, joined the P Ranch partnership and the business became the Eastern Oregon Live Stock Company. In the 1920s, the part of the French-Glenn property known as the Barton Lake Ranch was bought by John Jenkins. This property includes the well-known Pete French Round Barn. In 1935, a large part of the P Ranch was incorporated into the Malheur National Wildlife Refuge.

== Malheur National Wildlife Refuge ==
The Malheur Migratory Bird Refuge was created in 1908. Over the years, the refuge grew to encompass 81,786 acres (330.98 km^{2}) around Malheur Lake. In 1935, the United States Government purchased 64,717 acres (261.90 km^{2}) of P Ranch property from the Eastern Oregon Live Stock Company for $675,000, adding the land to the refuge. The refuge was later renamed the Malheur National Wildlife Refuge.

During the 1930s, the refuge hosted three Civilian Conservation Corps camps. One was located at the Sod-House Ranch south of Malheur Lake. A second camp was located at Buena Vista Station and the third was located 5 miles (8.0 km) north of Frenchglen in the P Ranch area. Civilian Conservation Corps crews built a number of stone buildings to house the refuge headquarters at the Sod-House site. In addition, they constructed several refuge buildings at Buena Vista, four lookout towers, the main refuge patrol road, four concrete dams, numerous canals and bridges, and hundreds of miles of fence. The Civilian Conservation Corps also demolished most of the original ranch structures before the camps were closed in 1942.

After the Civilian Conservation Corps left, the remaining ranch buildings, including Peter French's main house at the P Ranch, continued to be used by the United States Fish and Wildlife Service to support refuge operations. Unfortunately, a fire destroyed the main ranch house in 1947 (story and photos), leaving only the foundation and a stone chimney that had been attached to the west end of the house.

Because it played an important role in the development of the cattle industry in the western United States, the P Ranch was listed on the National Register of Historic Places on 29 January 1979. The historic district covers 60 acres (0.24 km^{2}) along both sides of the Donner und Blitzen River. Today, the Long Barn is the only historic building left at the site.

== Structures ==
At its peak, the P Ranch complex included at least twenty-one buildings. Today, only one building and two other historic structures remain at the P Ranch site. In addition to the Long Barn, there is a beef wheel and some original stock fences.

The Long Barn was built in the 1880s. It is 150 feet (46 m) long and 50 feet (15 m) wide. It is a post and beam structure. There are 56 heavy log posts in two rows that support the roof, which is 30 feet (9.1 m) high at its peak. The exterior of the barn is finished with pine and aspen lumber. The roof is covered with pine shingles. The original foundation sills were replaced by the Civilian Conservation Corps in 1939. The interior of the barn is a single large room. It has a 12 feet (3.7 m) wide center isle running between the two rows of support posts. Hay is still stored in the center isle; often stack to the crest of the roof. Along both side of the barn are feed racks and animal stalls. The United States Fish and Wildlife Service stabilized and restored the Long Barn in 2008. Today, the United States Fish and Wildlife Service uses the Long Barn to bed down horses and store hay.

The ranch property also has an original beef wheel, used to hoist slaughtered cattle off the ground to cool. It was built in the 1880s, when Peter French employed a hundred or more ranch hands. To feed all its dependents, the ranch needed to slaughter two cattle per week so the beef wheel was an important piece of structural equipment. The wheel is quite large since it had to lift beef carcasses high enough off the ground that the meat was safe from dogs and coyotes. The wheel is a square pine frame mounted on two large juniper posts.

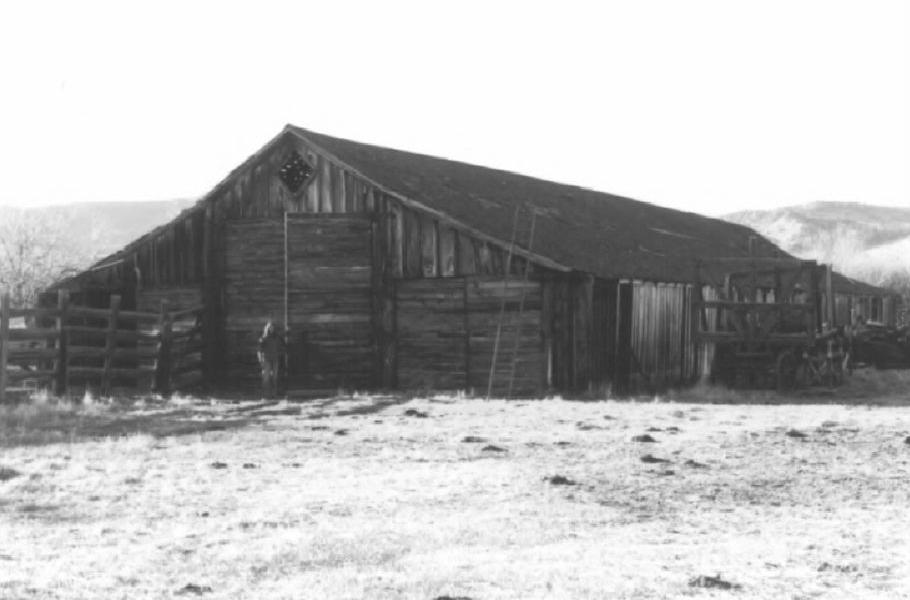
*Southeast exterior of Long Barn

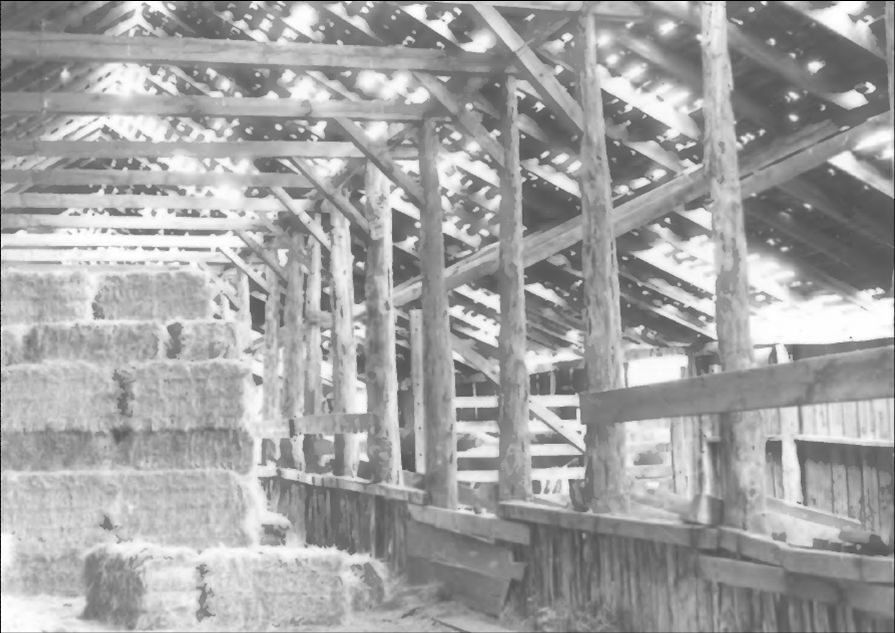
*Barn post and beam structure

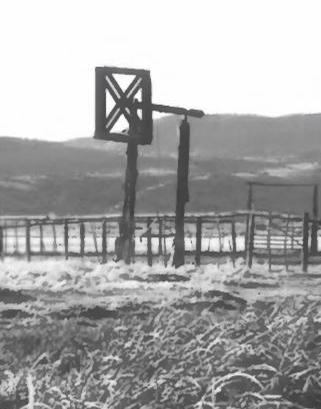
*Original P Ranch beef wheel

Several sections of original stockade fence still remain at P Ranch site. These fences are made of juniper slabs which are buried in trenches. The fence cross-pieces were originally bound to the slabs with rawhide. There are also several original willow corrals that still exist. These were made by weaving willow shoots between upright juniper posts.

== Location ==
The P Ranch Historic District covers 60 acres (0.24 km^{2}) along the Donner und Blitzen River in southeastern Oregon. The elevation of the ranch is 4,196 feet (1,279 m) above sea level.

The P Ranch is located within the boundaries of the Malheur National Wildlife Refuge. The ranch is 1.5 miles (2.4 km) east of Frenchglen, Oregon. From Frenchglen, travel east 1.5 miles (2.4 km) on the Steens Mountain Loop Road; then turn north on the Malheur National Wildlife Refuge Central Patrol Road. The ranch entrance is on the west side of the road approximately .25 miles (0.40 km) from the Steens Mountain Loop Road junction.
