= William A. Hanley =

American mechanical engineer and business executive

William Andrew Hanley (1886 – December 13, 1966) was an American mechanical engineer, business executive in Indianapolis, and 60th president of the American Society of Mechanical Engineers in 1940–1941.

Hanley was born in Greencastle, Indiana in 1886 to Michael T. Hanley and Catherine (Connell) Hanley. After attending Saint Joseph's College, he obtained his BSc from Purdue University in 1911. He had started as apprentice at the Republic Steel Corporation and then at Broderick Boiler Company, before going to the Purdue University. After graduation he joined the Eli Lilly and Company, a manufacturing company of medicinal products. He worked his way up from supervisor, and head of the engineering division to director.

In 1940-41 he served as president of the American Society of Mechanical Engineers. In 1937 the Purdue University awarded him the honorary doctorate in engineering.

== Selected publications ==
- Hanley, William A. "Air-Conditioning in the Drug-Manufacturing Industry." Industrial & Engineering Chemistry 25.1 (1933): 9–12.

Patents, a selection

- Hanley, William A., and Bruce T. Childs. "Capsule filling machine." U.S. Patent No. 1,993,716. 5 Mar. 1935.
