= Donner und Blitzen River =

River in Oregon, U.S.

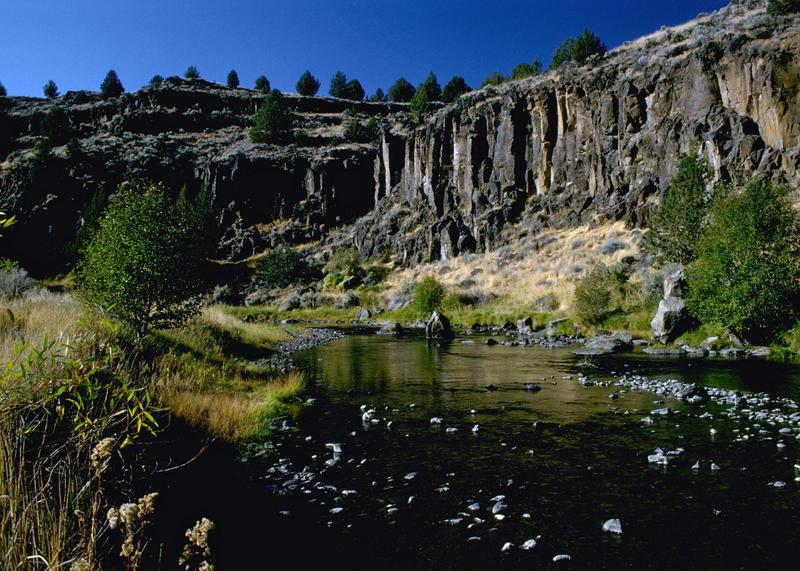
- Donner und Blitzen River near Page Springs campground

- Location of the mouth of the Donner und Blitzen River in Oregon
- Etymology: German for thunder and lightning. Given in 1864 by soldiers who crossed the river during a thunderstorm.

Location
- Country: United States
- State: Oregon
- County: Harney

Physical characteristics
- Source: southwest of Steens Mountain
  - location: Harney County, Oregon
  - coordinates: 42°32′02″N 118°43′52″W
  - elevation: 6,527 ft (1,989 m)
- Mouth: Malheur Lake
  - location: Harney County, Oregon
  - coordinates: 43°17′30″N 118°49′12″W
  - elevation: 4,101 ft (1,250 m)
- Length: 60 mi (97 km)
- Basin size: 791 sq mi (2,050 km^{2})
- Discharge
  - location: 3.5 miles (5.6 km) southeast of Frenchglen
  - average: 126 cu ft/s (3.6 m^{3}/s)
  - minimum: 4.2 cu ft/s (0.12 m^{3}/s)
  - maximum: 4,270 cu ft/s (121 m^{3}/s)

National Wild and Scenic River
- Type: Wild
- Designated: October 28, 1988

The Donner und Blitzen River/dɒndər ən ˈblɪtsən/ is a river on the eastern Oregon high desert that drains a relatively arid basin, the southern portion of Harney Basin, from roughly 20 to 80 miles (30 to 130 km) south-southeast of Burns including Malheur National Wildlife Refuge. Though much of its course is marsh, it offers scenic glaciated canyons, unique ecosystems, and exceptional wild trout fisheries. Named by soldiers of German origin, the Donner und Blitzen River translates as "thunder and lightning". The name usually brings to mind two of Santa Claus's reindeer, but the river is named for a thunderstorm the soldiers experienced as they crossed the river; dry lightning is an almost daily occurrence in the region during certain times of the year.

The Donner und Blitzen River arises as an intermittent stream on the lower slopes west of Steens Mountain at the 6,500-foot (2,000 m) level at 42.533779°N 118.731023°W, roughly 80 miles (130 km) south-southeast of Burns and 11 miles (18 km) northwest of Alvord Lake and empties at 43.291542°N 118.8199273°W into Malheur Lake. Numerous nearby springs create its tributaries including South Fork Blitzen River, Little Blitzen River, Big Indian Creek, Little Indian Creek, Fish Creek, Mud Creek, and Ankle Creek. It collects these and runs north or northwest, descending rapidly to the plateau floor, then turns northward to Malheur Lake, which has no outlet. It does not pass through any cities, though it comes within 2 miles (3.2 km) of Frenchglen. Much of the river runs through what was once the P Ranch, one of the largest ranches in the west until the ranch was purchased by the United States Government in 1935.

The Blitzen is home to a native species of Great Basin Redband Trout amongst many other unique forms of flora and fauna. Over the last century, the fish population has decreased due to increased human activity in the surrounding areas. As part of the 2000 Steens Mountain Protection Act, congress and President Clinton signed off on the creation of the Donner und Blitzen Red Band Trout Reserve. The Reserve was designated “to conserve, protect, and enhance the Donner und Blitzen population of redband trout and the unique ecosystem of plants, fish, and wildlife of a river system.”

In 1988, 72.7 miles (117.0 km) of rivers in its basin were designated Wild and Scenic, and another 14.8 miles (23.8 km) were added in 2000. The Oregon Department of Environmental Quality (DEQ) lists seven temperature impairments on the river system. The maximum recorded flow of 4,270 cubic feet per second (121 m^{3}/s) occurred on April 26, 1978, and was extrapolated from a calibrated value of 1,900 cu ft/s (54 m^{3}/s). The minimum recorded flow 4.2 cu ft/s (0.12 m^{3}/s) occurred December 9, 1972, caused by widespread freezing.

== See also ==
- Blitzen, Oregon
- List of rivers of Oregon
- List of longest streams of Oregon
- List of National Wild and Scenic Rivers
- Harney Basin
