= Rock Creek (Catlow Valley) =

- Location of the mouth of Rock Creek in Oregon

Location
- Country: United States
- State: Oregon
- County: Lake, Harney

Physical characteristics
- Source: Hart Mountain
  - location: Lake County
  - coordinates: 42°26′57″N 119°41′33″W
  - elevation: 6,914 ft (2,107 m)
- Mouth: Catlow Valley
  - location: Harney County
  - coordinates: 42°39′41″N 119°10′08″W
  - elevation: 4,557 ft (1,389 m)
- Length: 56 mi (90 km)
- Basin size: 269 sq mi (700 km^{2})

Rock Creek is a 56-mile (90 km) intermittent stream flowing in Lake and Harney counties in the U.S. state of Oregon. The source of Rock Creek is at an elevation of 6,914 feet (2,107 m) on Hart Mountain, while the mouth is at an elevation of 4,557 feet (1,389 m) in the Catlow Valley. Rock Creek has a 269-square-mile (700 km^{2}) watershed.

From its source northeast of Warner Peak, the creek flows generally northeast, with segments that flow generally north and others that flow generally east, across the Hart Mountain National Antelope Refuge. The creek flows through Hot Springs Campground, where Bond Creek, a named tributary, enters from the right. The creek passes by Antelope Hot Springs downstream of the campground. Further downstream, it flows through the refuge headquarters, where it passes under Frenchglen Road. The creek then runs roughly parallel to Poker Jim Ridge, on the left, before heading east into Rock Creek Reservoir and then into Catlow Valley. Catlow Valley is a closed basin, with no outlet to the sea.

== See also ==
- List of rivers of Oregon
- List of longest streams of Oregon
