= Great Basin redband trout =

Scientific classification
- Kingdom: Animalia
- Phylum: Chordata
- Class: Actinopterygii
- Division: Teleostei
- Order: Salmoniformes
- Family: Salmonidae
- Genus: Oncorhynchus
- Species: O. mykiss
- Subspecies: O. m. newberrii

Trinomial name
- Oncorhynchus mykiss newberrii (Girard, 1859)

Subspecies of fish

The Great Basin redband trout (Oncorhynchus mykiss newberrii) is one of three redband trout subspecies of the rainbow trout in the western United States.

The Great Basin redband trout is native to drainages in south central Oregon east of the Cascade Range, extreme north east California and extreme north west Nevada. They occur in seven isolated drainages—the Upper Klamath Lake basin, Fort Rock basin, Harney-Malheur basin, Catlow basin, Warner Lakes basin, Goose Lake basin, and the Chewaucan basin.
