= Seneca, Oregon =

- City
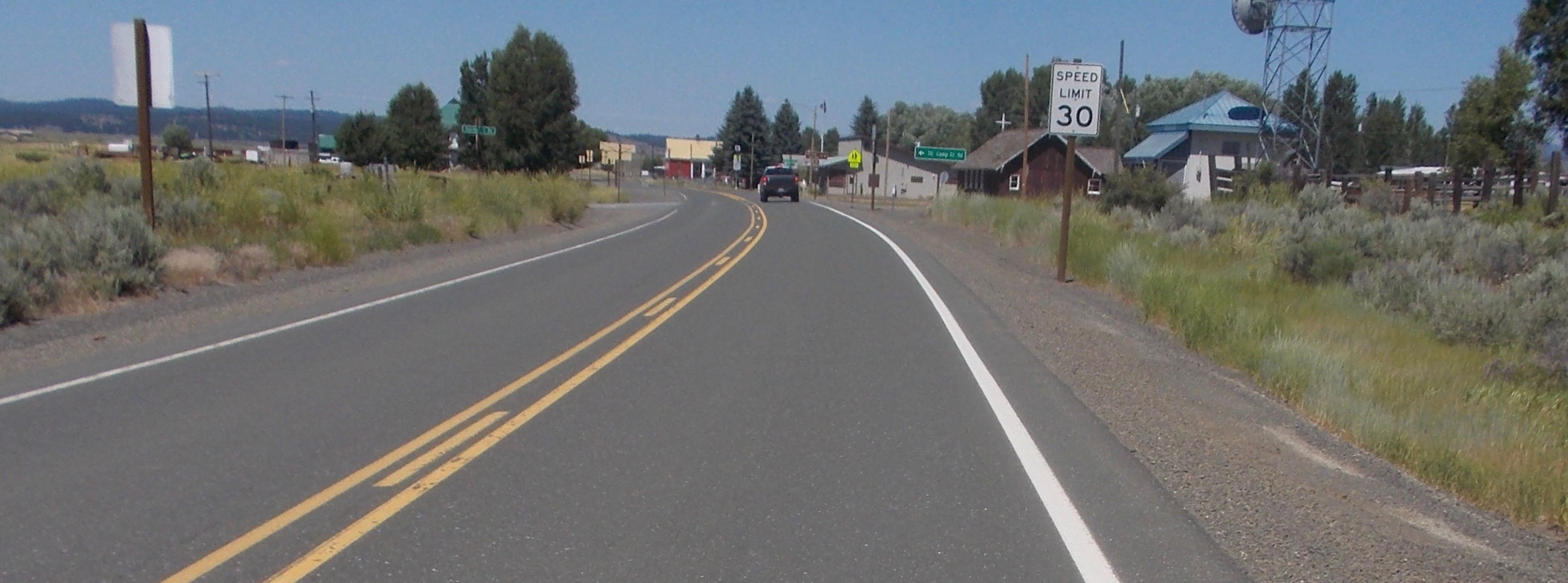
- Seneca along U.S. Route 395

- Location in Oregon
- Coordinates: 44°08′07″N 118°58′35″W
- Country: United States
- State: Oregon
- County: Grant
- Incorporated: 1970

Government
  - Mayor: Brad Smith

Area
  - Total: 0.80 sq mi (2.06 km^{2})
  - Land: 0.80 sq mi (2.06 km^{2})
  - Water: 0 sq mi (0.00 km^{2})
- Elevation: 4,675 ft (1,425 m)

Population (2020)
  - Total: 165
  - Density: 207.6/sq mi (80.14/km^{2})
- Time zone: UTC-8 (Pacific)
  - Summer (DST): UTC-7 (Pacific)
- ZIP code: 97873
- Area code: 541
- FIPS code: 41-66200
- GNIS feature ID: 2411867
- Website: www.senecaoregon.com

Seneca is a city in Grant County, Oregon, United States. It is located in the Blue Mountains about 23 miles (37 km) south of Canyon City, on U.S. Route 395, on the edge of the Malheur National Forest. As of the 2020 census, Seneca had a population of 165.

== History ==
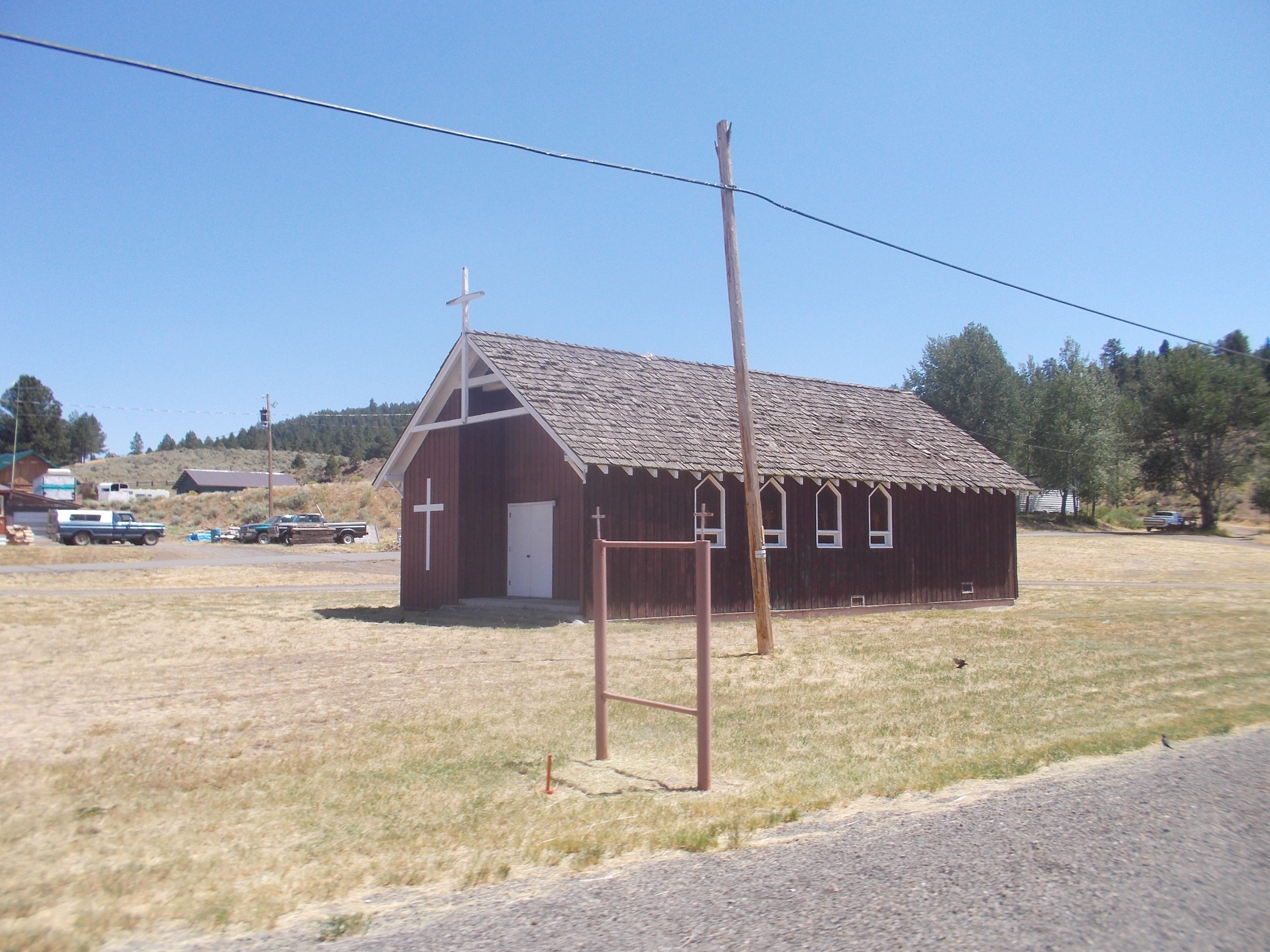
A church in Seneca

Seneca post office was established in 1895 and named by postmaster Minnie Southworth for her brother-in-law, prominent Portland judge Seneca Smith.

While early homesteaders moved into the valley in the late 1800s, Seneca only began growing in the 1929 when it became the northern terminus of the now-vacated Oregon and Northwestern Railroad, owned by the Edward Hines Lumber Company, which extended south to Burns. At that time, large-scale shipping of Ponderosa Pine logs from Seneca and the surrounding national forest began to the Hines sawmill in Hines. The company established a planing mill and railroad shops in Seneca, and it became essentially a company town. In 1940 Seneca's population was 275. Logging in the area began to decline in the 1970s, and the Hines company ceased operations of its lumber mills and railroad in 1984. The town was incorporated as a city in 1970 as lumber company control began to wane. According to the 1980 census, Seneca's population was 285. The estimated population in 2007 was 270.

== Geography ==
According to the United States Census Bureau, the city has a total area of 0.80 square miles (2.07 km^{2}), all land.

Situated at the confluence of Bear Creek and the Silvies River, Seneca is in Bear Valley at the northern edge of the Great Basin.

=== Climate ===
Seneca has a humid continental influenced semi-arid climate (Köppen climate classification BSk/Dsb/Dsc) with warm daytime temperatures in summer and cool to cold nighttime temperatures all year. Average high temperatures throughout the year are relatively mild for a subarctic climate. It is right on the border of a semi-arid subarctic climate with the fourth warmest month of the year straddling 50 °F (10 °C).

Seneca experiences the coolest weather in Grant County and has the distinction of the coldest official temperature recorded in Oregon: −54 °F (−48 °C) in 1933.

Climate data for Seneca, Oregon, 1991–2020 normals, extremes 1912–2021
Month	Jan	Feb	Mar	Apr	May	Jun	Jul	Aug	Sep	Oct	Nov	Dec	Year
Record high °F (°C)	58 (14)	64 (18)	74 (23)	83 (28)	89 (32)	104 (40)	104 (40)	104 (40)	100 (38)	90 (32)	72 (22)	59 (15)	104 (40)
Mean maximum °F (°C)	47.4 (8.6)	52.1 (11.2)	61.9 (16.6)	71.2 (21.8)	80.1 (26.7)	87.1 (30.6)	94.3 (34.6)	93.7 (34.3)	89.6 (32.0)	78.0 (25.6)	61.9 (16.6)	47.5 (8.6)	96.0 (35.6)
Mean daily maximum °F (°C)	35.9 (2.2)	40.0 (4.4)	46.3 (7.9)	52.6 (11.4)	61.8 (16.6)	70.0 (21.1)	82.1 (27.8)	81.9 (27.7)	73.4 (23.0)	59.6 (15.3)	44.4 (6.9)	35.7 (2.1)	57.0 (13.9)
Daily mean °F (°C)	23.5 (−4.7)	26.8 (−2.9)	33.1 (0.6)	38.8 (3.8)	46.8 (8.2)	53.1 (11.7)	60.3 (15.7)	58.4 (14.7)	50.3 (10.2)	40.5 (4.7)	30.8 (−0.7)	23.4 (−4.8)	40.5 (4.7)
Mean daily minimum °F (°C)	11.1 (−11.6)	13.6 (−10.2)	19.9 (−6.7)	25.1 (−3.8)	31.7 (−0.2)	36.2 (2.3)	38.5 (3.6)	34.9 (1.6)	27.3 (−2.6)	21.4 (−5.9)	17.1 (−8.3)	11.1 (−11.6)	24.0 (−4.4)
Mean minimum °F (°C)	−11.5 (−24.2)	−4.9 (−20.5)	4.1 (−15.5)	14.6 (−9.7)	19.3 (−7.1)	26.1 (−3.3)	29.4 (−1.4)	24.9 (−3.9)	16.1 (−8.8)	7.1 (−13.8)	−2.9 (−19.4)	−12.5 (−24.7)	−20.2 (−29.0)
Record low °F (°C)	−43 (−42)	−54 (−48)	−26 (−32)	2 (−17)	6 (−14)	16 (−9)	19 (−7)	13 (−11)	1 (−17)	−11 (−24)	−31 (−35)	−41 (−41)	−54 (−48)
Average precipitation inches (mm)	1.58 (40)	1.01 (26)	1.23 (31)	1.18 (30)	1.71 (43)	1.19 (30)	0.53 (13)	0.38 (9.7)	0.53 (13)	1.07 (27)	1.44 (37)	1.82 (46)	13.67 (345.7)
Average snowfall inches (cm)	11.2 (28)	7.8 (20)	6.3 (16)	1.4 (3.6)	0.4 (1.0)	0.0 (0.0)	0.0 (0.0)	0.0 (0.0)	0.0 (0.0)	0.8 (2.0)	7.4 (19)	23.0 (58)	58.3 (147.6)
Average precipitation days (≥ 0.01 in)	11.8	9.9	11.0	10.6	9.5	7.2	3.8	3.1	4.3	7.6	11.8	12.7	103.3
Average snowy days (≥ 0.1 in)	6.1	4.3	3.0	1.2	0.3	0.0	0.0	0.0	0.0	0.5	3.5	7.4	26.3
Source 1: NOAA (snow/snow days 1981–2010)
Source 2: XMACIS2

== Demographics ==
Historical population
Census	Pop.	Note	%±
1980	285		—
1990	191		−33.0%
2000	223		16.8%
2010	199		−10.8%
2020	165		−17.1%
U.S. Decennial Census

=== 2020 census ===
As of the 2020 census, Seneca had a population of 165. The median age was 54.8 years. 13.9% of residents were under the age of 18 and 32.1% of residents were 65 years of age or older. For every 100 females there were 96.4 males, and for every 100 females age 18 and over there were 97.2 males age 18 and over.

0% of residents lived in urban areas, while 100.0% lived in rural areas.

There were 79 households in Seneca, of which 25.3% had children under the age of 18 living in them. Of all households, 45.6% were married-couple households, 16.5% were households with a male householder and no spouse or partner present, and 30.4% were households with a female householder and no spouse or partner present. About 27.8% of all households were made up of individuals and 20.3% had someone living alone who was 65 years of age or older.

There were 120 housing units, of which 34.2% were vacant. Among occupied housing units, 70.9% were owner-occupied and 29.1% were renter-occupied. The homeowner vacancy rate was 1.7% and the rental vacancy rate was 11.5%.

Racial composition as of the 2020 census
Race	Number	Percent
White	153	92.7%
Black or African American	0	0%
American Indian and Alaska Native	0	0%
Asian	0	0%
Native Hawaiian and Other Pacific Islander	0	0%
Some other race	1	0.6%
Two or more races	11	6.7%
Hispanic or Latino (of any race)	2	1.2%

=== 2010 census ===
As of the census of 2010, there were 199 people, 95 households, and 60 families residing in the city. The population density was 248.8 inhabitants per square mile (96.1/km^{2}). There were 128 housing units at an average density of 160.0 per square mile (61.8/km^{2}). The racial makeup of the city was 99.0% White, 0.5% African American, and 0.5% from two or more races. Hispanic or Latino of any race were 1.0% of the population.

There were 95 households, of which 21.1% had children under the age of 18 living with them, 51.6% were married couples living together, 11.6% had a female householder with no husband present, and 36.8% were non-families. 31.6% of all households were made up of individuals, and 15.8% had someone living alone who was 65 years of age or older. The average household size was 2.09 and the average family size was 2.53.

The median age in the city was 52.5 years. 16.1% of residents were under the age of 18; 7.9% were between the ages of 18 and 24; 15% were from 25 to 44; 35.6% were from 45 to 64; and 25.1% were 65 years of age or older. The gender makeup of the city was 52.3% male and 47.7% female.

=== 2000 census ===
As of the census of 2000, there were 223 people, 95 households, and 64 families residing in the city. The population density was 267.8 inhabitants per square mile (103.4/km^{2}). There were 115 housing units at an average density of 138.1 per square mile (53.3/km^{2}). The racial makeup of the city was 99.10% White, 0.45% Asian, and 0.45% from two or more races. Hispanic or Latino of any race were 0.90% of the population.

There were 95 households, out of which 29.5% had children under the age of 18 living with them, 58.9% were married couples living together, 6.3% had a female householder with no husband present, and 32.6% were non-families. 29.5% of all households were made up of individuals, and 10.5% had someone living alone who was 65 years of age or older. The average household size was 2.35 and the average family size was 2.89.

In the city, the population was spread out, with 26.0% under the age of 18, 4.9% from 18 to 24, 25.1% from 25 to 44, 31.4% from 45 to 64, and 12.6% who were 65 years of age or older. The median age was 41 years. For every 100 females, there were 110.4 males. For every 100 females age 18 and over, there were 96.4 males.

The median income for a household in the city was $27,333, and the median income for a family was $26,806. Males had a median income of $30,000 versus $23,750 for females. The per capita income for the city was $12,636. About 24.0% of families and 19.8% of the population were below the poverty line, including 22.5% of those under the age of 18 and none of those 65 or over.

== Economy ==
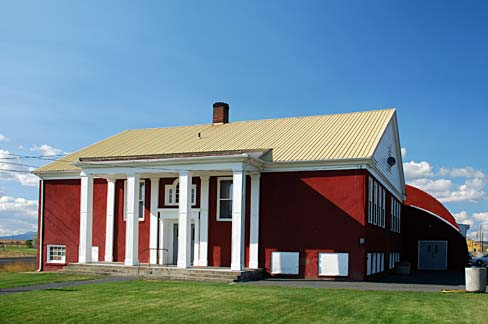
Seneca School

The main industries in Seneca are cattle ranching and timber production.

== Education ==
Seneca is served by the Grant School District (formerly the John Day School District). Seneca School is a K-5 school. After 5th grade students attend Grant Union High School in John Day. Seneca School was built in the 1930s to serve the employees of the Hines Lumber Company. As of 2011, the school had 58 students.
