= Old Camp Casino =

Casino in Oregon

Coordinates: 43.585489°N 119.091926°W

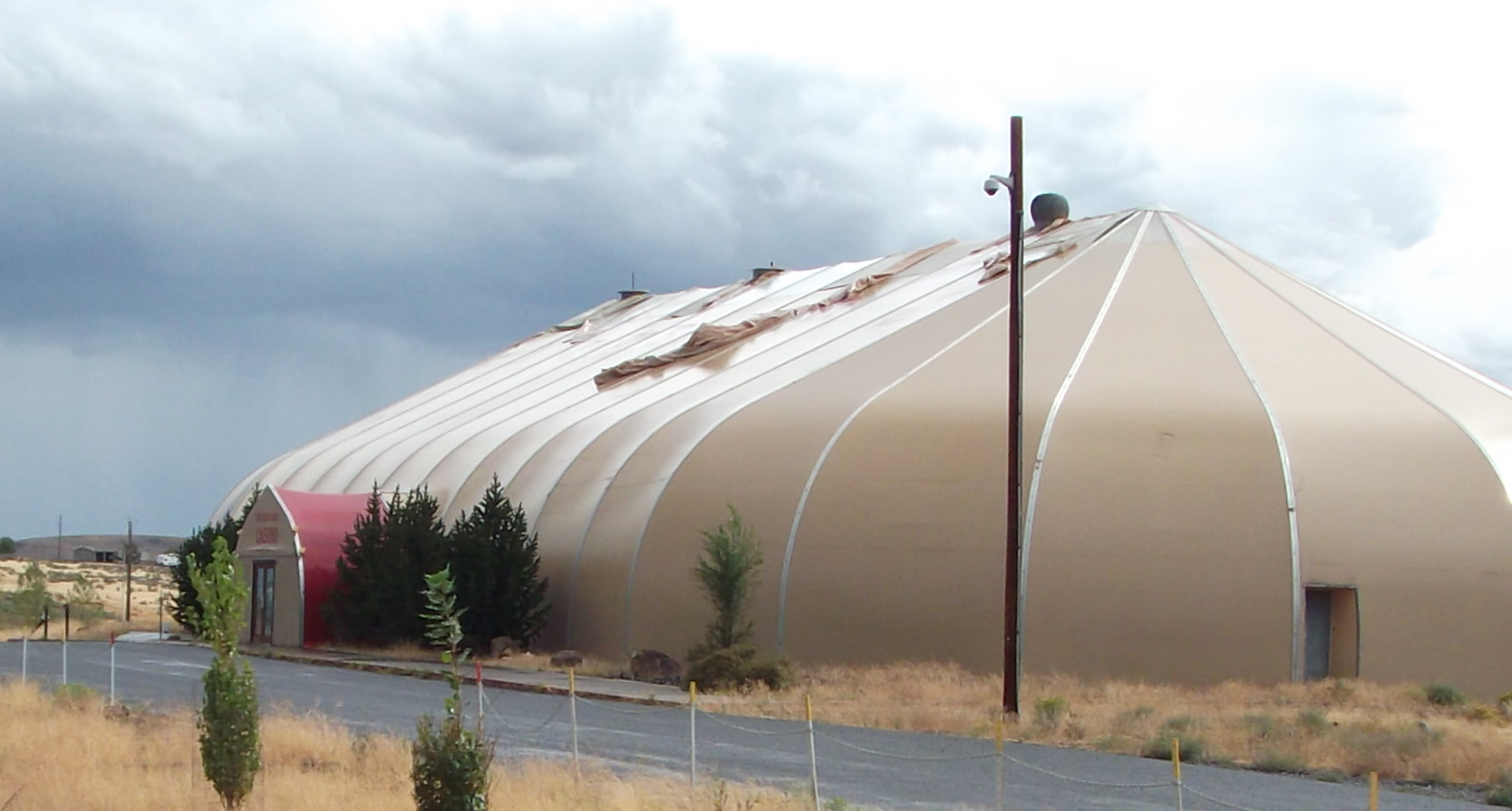
The casino in 2014, after closing in 2012

The Old Camp Casino was a tribal casino near Burns, Oregon, United States, owned and operated by the Burns Paiute Tribe.

The "Old Camp" name refers to a tribal settlement that was located on the site in the early 20th century.

== History ==
The tribe had difficulty financing development of a casino due to the reservation's remote location, with only 7,000 people living within a 100-mile radius. Out of four companies that responded to the tribe's 1997 request for proposals, the tribe selected Colorado-based Wolf Gaming to finance and manage the casino. Later that year, however, Wolf Gaming went out of business.

The tribe eventually secured a $930,000 loan from South Dakota–based Indian Gaming of America. The tribe purchased the building itself for $180,000 from the Lummi Tribe, and moved it from northwest Washington to the Burns Paiute reservation.

The casino opened in September 1998 with 15,000 square feet (1,400 m^{2}) of space containing 75 slot machines, two poker tables, and a deli. At opening, there were 53 employees.

Another 100 slot machines were later added, while table games, proving unprofitable, were removed.

The tribe closed the casino on November 26, 2012, due to safety concerns stemming from structural problems with the building. The tribe said it would demolish the building and construct a new one, to be opened in spring 2013, but as of October 2014, it had not opened.

== See also ==
- Gambling in Oregon
