= Harney, Oregon =

Unincorporated community in the state of Oregon, United States

- Unincorporated community
- Location within Oregon Location within the United States
- Coordinates: 43°38′36″N 118°49′22″W
- Country: United States
- State: Oregon
- County: Harney
- Named for: William S. Harney, a military officer
- Elevation: 4,173 ft (1,272 m)
- Time zone: UTC-8 (PST)
  - Summer (DST): UTC-7 (PDT)
- ZIP codes: 97720
- Area code: 541
- GNIS feature ID: 1143312

Harney is an unincorporated community in Harney County, in the U.S. state of Oregon. It lies north of U.S. Route 20 between Burns and Buchanan near the site of historic Fort Harney. The community, county, and nearby geographic features such as Harney Lake are named for William S. Harney, a military officer popular in the Pacific Northwest in the mid-19th century.

== History ==
The fort, part of a military establishment that fought with Indians off and on in the 1860s and 1870s, was at a place called variously Rattlesnake Camp, Camp Steele, Camp Harney, and finally Fort Harney. The fort and the land around it were abandoned as military property in 1889. Meanwhile, the civilian community had developed about 2 miles (3 km) south of the fort, along Rattlesnake Creek.

A post office named Camp Harney was established at Fort Harney in 1874. William T. Stevens was the first postmaster. The post office name was changed to Harney in 1885 and relocated to the Harney civilian community. Robert J. Ives was the first postmaster at the new location.

== Education ==
It is in Harney County School District 3. It operates Burns High School.
