= John Day School District =

School district in Oregon, United States

John Day School District, also known as Grant School District No. 3, is a school district based in Canyon City, Oregon.

The district includes the cities of Canyon City, John Day, Mount Vernon, and Seneca.

== History ==
Its enrollment was more than 1,100 in 1998.

Louis Dix was superintendent in the 2022–2023 school year, and retired at the end of the year. Mark Witty became superintendent in 2023. The board of trustees renewed his contract in 2025.

As of 2025 the district had fewer than 500 students.

As of 2025 the school district planned to use a grant of over $682,000 to modify the energy usage at the junior and senior high school. In 2025, layoffs occurred at the United States Department of Energy, which could affect the grant. The district, by March 2025, had spent money in the hundreds of thousands of dollars for the planning for the energy usage project.

== Schools ==
- Grant Union Junior/Senior High School (John Day)
- Humboldt Elementary School (Canyon City)
- Seneca Elementary School (Seneca)
