= Grant Union High School =

Grant Union High School may refer to:

- Grant Union High School (John Day, Oregon)
- Grant Union High School (Sacramento, California)
