= Oregon and Northwestern Railroad =

Coordinates: 43.869188°N 118.979187°W

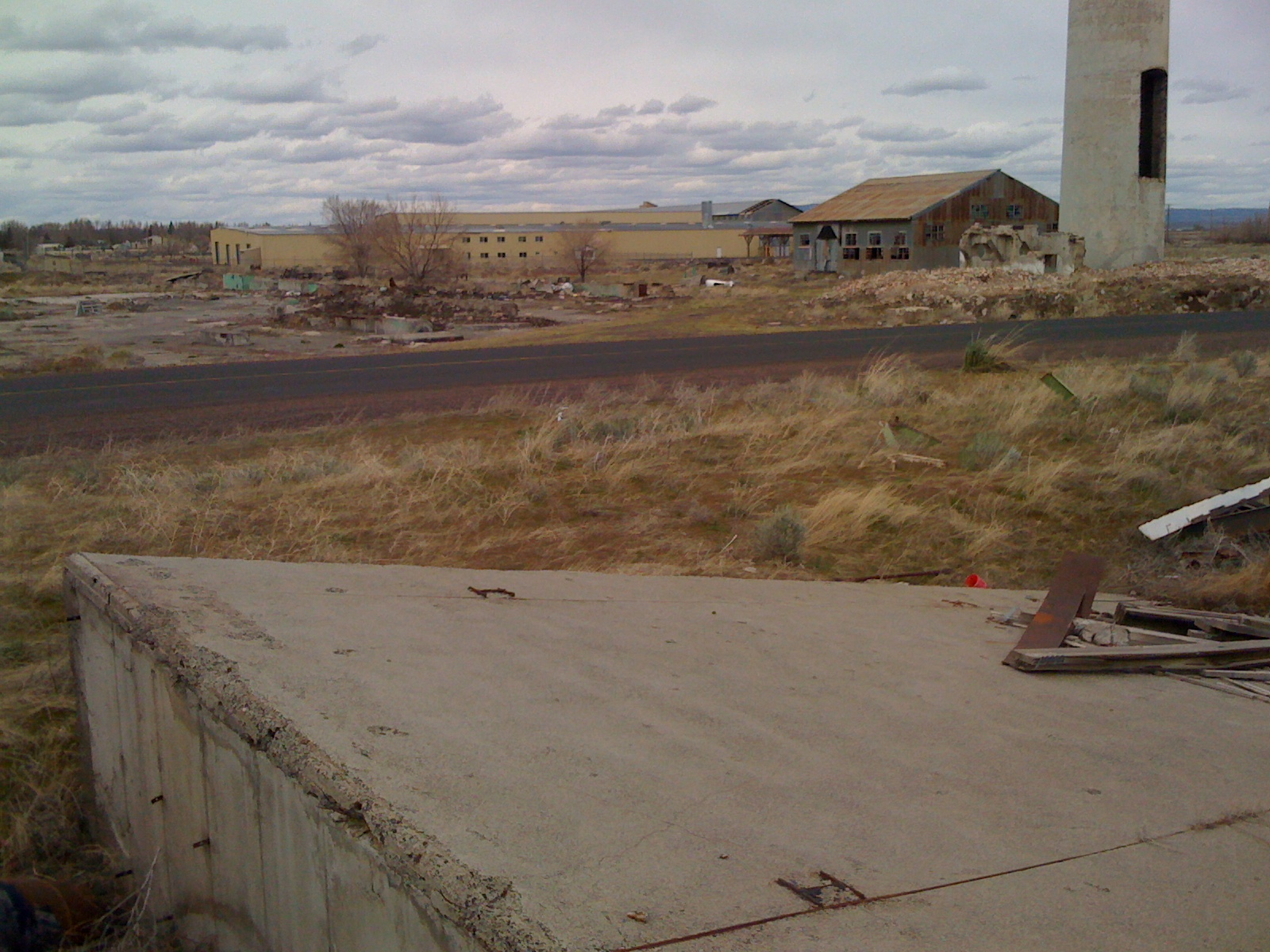
- The former lumber mill at the railroad's southern end in Hines

Overview
- Headquarters: Hines
- Locale: Grant County and Harney County, Oregon, USA
- Dates of operation: 1928–1984
- Predecessor: Malheur Railroad

Technical
- Length: 50.2 miles (80.8 km)

The Oregon and Northwestern Railroad (O&NW) is a defunct railroad in Eastern Oregon in the United States. It ran 50.2 miles (80.8 km) from Hines north to Seneca, which is on the edge of the Malheur National Forest, over a total of 19 trestles.

== Beginnings through 1930 ==
The railroad's history began when the Edward Hines Lumber Company, having won a bid for a timber sale in the Malheur National Forest east of Seneca, purchased the Malheur Railroad and its corresponding sawmill, both incomplete, from the Fred Herrick Lumber Company for $400,000 in 1928 (equivalent to $7,324,806 in 2024). In the early 1920s, Herrick had won a Forest Service auction of ponderosa pine (western yellow pine) forest in the Bear Creek valley east of Seneca in the Malheur National Forest, and his company built the Malheur Railroad 30 miles (48 km) from Crane northwest to Burns in 1924. The company started to build a sawmill southwest of Burns and a rail line from Burns to Seneca, but it ran into financial troubles and did not complete either of those. Failing to meet the terms of its contract with the Forest Service, Herrick's company lost the timber contract in 1927. The Forest Service timber contract then went to the Edward Hines Western Pine Lumber Company in 1928.

The Edward Hines Lumber Company finished construction of the sawmill, where the company town of Hines developed, and completed the Malheur Railroad between Hines and Seneca in 1929, thereby linking Crane with Seneca. The track between Hines and Seneca became the Oregon and Northwestern Railroad. The railroad received its permit from the Interstate Commerce Commission and became a common carrier on 16 January 1934. From 1929 until 1934, The railroad was a division of Edward Hines Western Pine Company. Charles John Pettibone was superintendent of the railroad and assistant manager of the lumber company.

By the end of 1929, the company had begun to harvest and transport ponderosa pine from the Bear Creek valley. The sawmill began processing logs in January 1930 and was envisioned to produce 120 million board feet (280,000 m^{3}) of lumber each year.

== Labor camp ==
The mill in Hines supplied wood products for the Allies' efforts in World War II. Since many Edward Hines Lumber Company employees had left to serve in the war, the company sought to hire new workers for the railroad and the mill. During the Japanese American internment, the company operated Trout Creek Camp, a "primitive" railroad labor camp 25 miles (40 km) north of Burns. In 1943, some Japanese Americans at the camp worked 8 to 10 hours per day for a wage of less than one dollar per hour (equivalent to $18 in 2024). Due to perceptions that Japanese Americans posed threats to the United States at the time, they had been required "to swear an oath of loyalty to the United States" before being hired. The camp was home to no more than 30 people during the war, and "when the war ended in 1945, most of the Japanese-Americans left, to be succeeded by Basque laborers." The railroad closed the camp in 1976.

== Later years to abandonment ==
The Edward Hines Lumber Company owned and operated the railroad for many decades. In 1962, the mill reached a peak in lumber production—134,250,000 board feet (316,800 m^{3}) that year—as well as in payroll, but employees held strikes later that decade, and the lumber market began to decline in the 1970s. By December 1981, demand for lumber had sharply decreased; the company was transporting logs at only one quarter of capacity and was employing just 12 workers for the railroad. At the time, the company employed a total of 229 people, which was nearly four times fewer than its high of 900; many had been laid off in 1980. The railroad went out of service in March 1984 because of damage to the Oregon Eastern Branch of the Union Pacific Railroad from the flooding of Malheur Lake and because it was no longer profitable for the lumber company.

In 1990, the railroad was completely abandoned and lost its common carrier status. Four years later, in 1994, the railroad's 475-foot (145 m) tunnel, which had not been used since 1984, was closed to public use because its ceiling was beginning to collapse. Although its tracks were not well built, most of the railroad has been well preserved.
