= Harney County School District =

Harney County School District may refer to one of these school districts in Oregon:

- Harney County School District 3, Burns
- Harney County School District 4 (Crane Elementary School District), Crane
- Harney County Union High School District (Crane Union High School District), Crane
