= Edward Hines Lumber Company =

American building materials company

Hines Supply
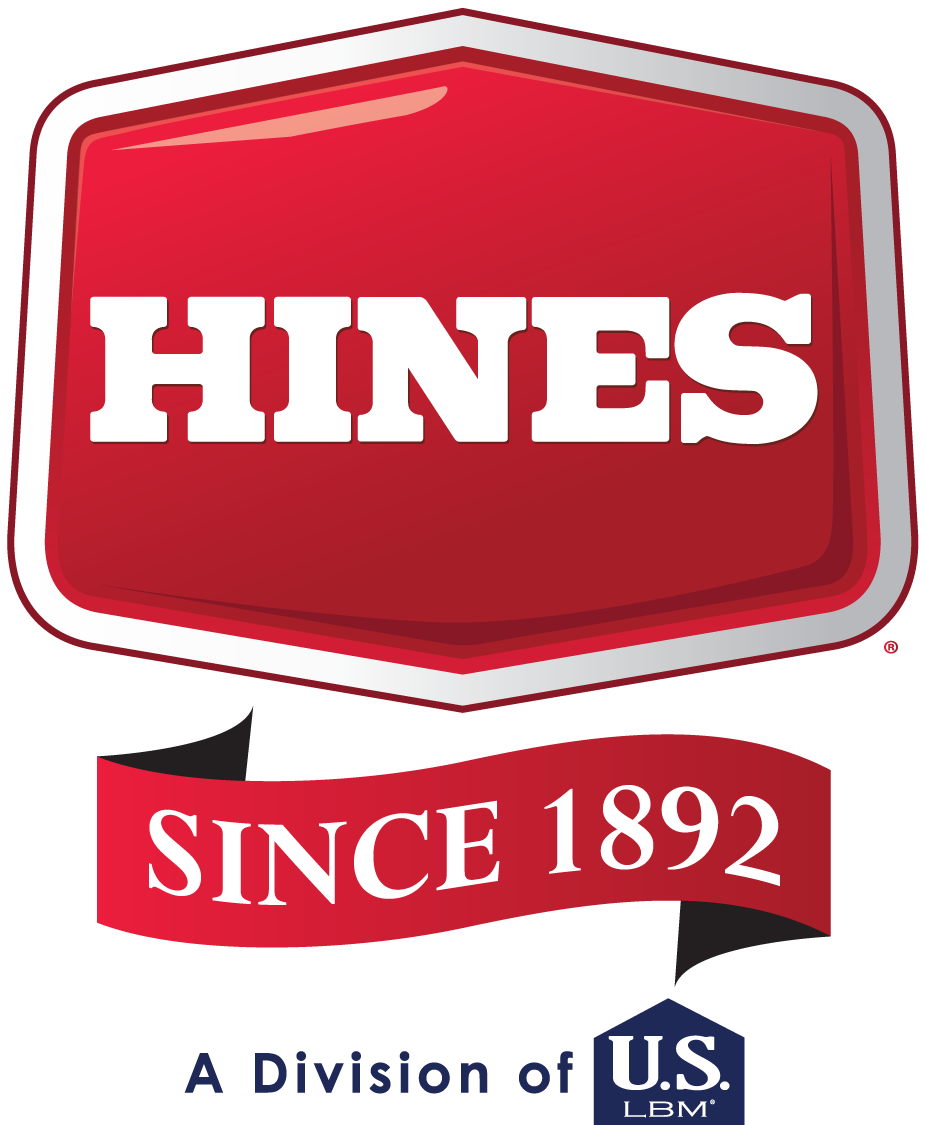
- Company type: Privately held subsidiary
- Founded: March 17, 1892
- Founder: Edward Hines
- Headquarters: Buffalo Grove, Illinois, United States
- Products: Building materials
- Parent: US LBM Holdings, LLC
- Website: www.hinessupply.com

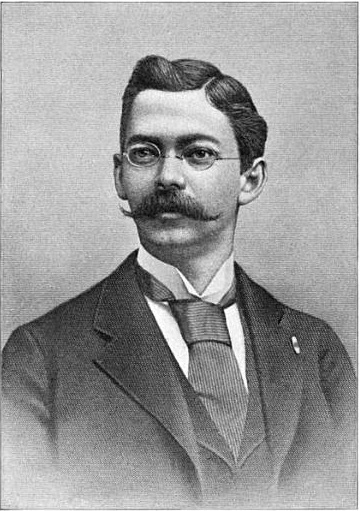
Edward Hines (1863–1931) circa 1901

Hines Supply (originally the Edward Hines Lumber Company), based in Buffalo Grove, Illinois, in the United States, is a company which manufactures lumber, plywood and other wood products. It also sells related services such as consultations and cost estimates for building projects.

== History ==
Edward Hines, born in Buffalo, New York, in 1863, moved with his family to the Chicago area when he was two years old. Starting work at age 14 as an office boy for the S.K. Martin & Co., a Chicago lumber wholesaler, he became that firm's secretary-treasurer by age 21. In 1892, he started his own company, Edward Hines Lumber Co., and acquired the Martin company three years later. Frederick Weyerhauser, who founded the Weyerhaeuser timber company, became friends with Hines and served as a director of the Hines firm.

Hines, who specialized in large-scale operations, acquired big tracts of standing timber, built rail lines for hauling logs, acquired sawmills in Wisconsin and elsewhere, and leased timber-cutting permits in Canada. One of his larger undertakings involved the Virginia and Rainy Lake Company, a joint venture among Hines and Weyerhauser affiliates that employed 2,800 men and 900 horses to cut and process timber in Canada and northern Minnesota through the late 1920s. Other ventures involved purchase of the Continental Coal Company of West Virginia, timber stands in Mississippi, and a 67,400-acre (27,300 ha) tract in the Malheur National Forest near Burns, Oregon, that held "possibly the largest volume of timber ever sold in the Pacific Northwest".

Known as the Bear Valley Unit, the large Oregon tract, near Seneca, was laid out in 1922 by the United States Forest Service. It was first sold to Fred Herrick in 1923, but Herrick defaulted on his contract with the Forest Service, and Hines acquired rights to the unit's 890 million board feet of timber in 1928. One of the goals of the Forest Service was to improve rail connections between national lumber markets and the Blue Mountain forests of eastern Oregon. After winning the timber contract, the Hines Company built the 52-mile (84 km) Oregon and Northwestern Railroad between Burns and Seneca. Timber cutting from the Bear Valley Unit continued through 1968.

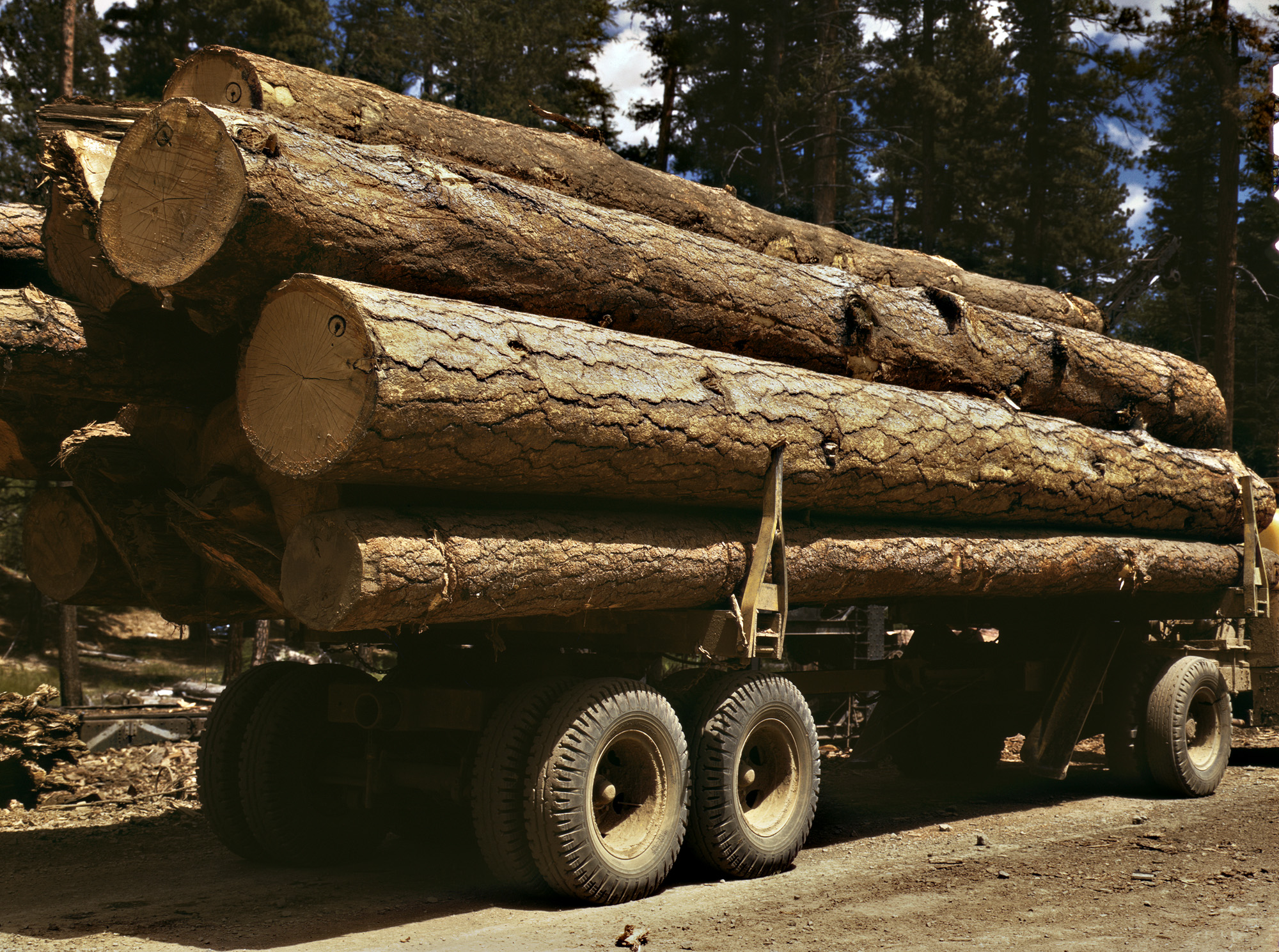
1942: Ponderosa pine logs from the Hines tract in the Malheur National Forest

Adjacent to Burns, Hines built a company town, incorporated as the City of Hines in 1930. Edward Hines and his wife, Loretta, designed the city around an oval park surrounded by houses with individual features meant to prevent mill-town housing monotony. In the 1990s, long after Hines' death in 1931, the company sold its interest in the mill.

== Current operations ==
Since March 29, 2010, the company has operated as a subsidiary of US LBM Holdings, LLC, a new company based in Green Bay, Wisconsin. US LBM Holdings was founded by a private equity firm, BlackEagle Partners, LLC, based in Detroit, Michigan. BlackEagle bought the Hines company's bank debt after the lumber company encountered financial difficulty. Edward Hines Lumber Company is "one of the largest building materials suppliers" in the Chicago area.
