= Burns High School (Oregon) =

Location
- 1100 Oregon Avenue; Burns, Oregon 97720; United States; 43.576025°N 119.074084°W

Information
- Type: Public high school
- School district: Harney County School District 3 (1989–); Burns Union High School District No. 2 (–1989)
- NCES School ID: 410249000379
- Principal: Robert Medley
- Teaching staff: 16.00 (on an FTE basis)
- Grades: 9–12
- Enrollment: 230 (2023–2024)
- Student to teacher ratio: 14.38
- Colors: Purple and gold
- Athletics conference: OSAA Wapiti League 2A-6
- Mascot: Hilander
- Nickname: Hilanders
- Rival: Lakeview High School (Oregon)
- Website: bhs.hcsd3.org

Burns High School is a public high school in Burns, Oregon. A part of Harney County School District 3, it serves Burns and Hines, as well as Harney. The reservation of the Burns Paiute Tribe is in this district.

It was formerly Burns Union High School. It belonged to the Burns Union High School District No. 2 (a.k.a. Harney County Union High School District No. 2) until 1989, when that district merged into Harney County School District 3. The name was changed due to the merger.

== History ==
In 1964, voters passed a school bond for an addition. 312 people voted for it and 289 people voted against it. The bond was for $200,000. Accordingly, a facility for Burns Union High was built in that decade.

In 1967, students at Crane Union High School temporarily attended Burns High due to a fire affecting the school facilities in Crane. People in Oregon donated funds and clothes to replace academic and personal items that were ruined. There had been a proposal to have the Crane HS district consolidate into the Burns HS district, but this did not happen.

In 1969, the enrollment at Burns Union was 500.

In 1971, the high school had 500 students. That year, there was a price freeze on school lunches from the federal government. In response, the high school district announced that it would no longer have any lunch services.

Circa 1974, the high school district acquired the Burns Air Force Station properties, but later returned them to the federal government. The district had planned to have career development services for region students and housing for students.

In a time prior to 1985, the school cafeteria ended operations due to a lack of use and an increase in operating costs. The high school student council started a shop in which students could buy certain meals and snacks.

Sometime before 1989, Burns Union High School District was in a "safety net" from Oregon state education authorities, a provision which would keep the school open even if the school district was unable to pass a levy for operations. In 1989, the Burns high school district merged with the Burns and Hines elementary districts.

In 1992, Redbook ranked Burns Union High as one of the 140 highest quality high schools in the United States. That year, the enrollment was 330.

== Academics ==
In 1987 and 1991, Burns High School was honored in the Blue Ribbon Schools Program, the highest honor a school can receive in the United States. In 1992, Redbook ranked Burns Union High as one of the 140 highest quality high schools in the United States.

In 2008, 82% of the school's seniors received their high school diploma. Of 77 students, 63 graduated, 3 dropped out, 6 received a modified diploma, and 5 are still in high school.

The Burns Alternative School is part of Burns High School.

Circa 1961, the school began a program about astronomy. By 1969 the school installed a telescope viewing system on the school roof so stars could be observed.

== Student body ==
In 1992, the parents and guardians of the students often were ranchers or in mining work. That year, Richard Cockle of The Oregonian described the families as "blue collar".

== Notable alumni ==
- Kellen Clemens, NFL football player
- Norma Paulus, Oregon politician and lawyer
- Gene Timms, member of the Oregon State Senate
