= Burns Paiute Tribe =

Indian tribe in Oregon, United States

Coordinates: 43.604138°N 119.069996°W

Wadadökadö and Hunipuitöka

Total population
- 349 (2016)

Regions with significant populations
- Harney County, Oregon

Languages
- English, Northern Paiute language, part of the Western Numic branch of the Uto-Aztecan language family

Religion
- American Indian pantheism, Christianity, other

Related ethnic groups
- Owens Valley Paiute, Southern Paiute

The Burns Paiute Tribe of the Burns Paiute Indian Colony of Oregon or Wadatika ("wada seed eaters") is a federally recognized tribe of Northern Paiute Native Americans in Harney County, Oregon, United States.

Location of Burns Paiute Indian Colony.

== History ==
Members of the tribe are primarily descendants of the Wadatika band of Northern Paiutes, who were hunter-gatherers traditionally living in Central and Southern Oregon. The Wadatika lived from the Cascade Mountains to Boise, Idaho, and from the Blue Mountains to Steens Mountain. The Burns Paiute formed when homeless Northern Paiutes gathered in Burns, Oregon and the surrounding region, which was allotted to the tribe in 1897.

Wadadökadö or Wadatika (Waadadikady): "Wada Root and Grass-seed Eaters", also known as Harney Valley Paiute, they controlled about 52,500 square miles (136,000 km^{2}) along the shores of Malheur Lake, between the Cascade Range in central Oregon and the Payette Valley north of Boise, Idaho, as well as in the southern parts of the Blue Mountains in the vicinity of the headwaters of the Powder River, north of the John Day River, southward to the desertlike surroundings of Steens Mountain. They are federally recognized as part of the Burns Paiute Tribe and part of the Confederated Tribes of Warm Springs. The tribe received federal recognition in 1968.

Hunipuitöka or Walpapi: "Hunipui-Root-Eaters", often called Snake Indians, they lived along Deschutes River, Crooked River and John Day River in Central Oregon. They are federally recognized as part of the Burns Paiute Tribe.

== Reservation ==
Map of the Burns Paiute Indian Colony with neighbouring reservations (In blue)

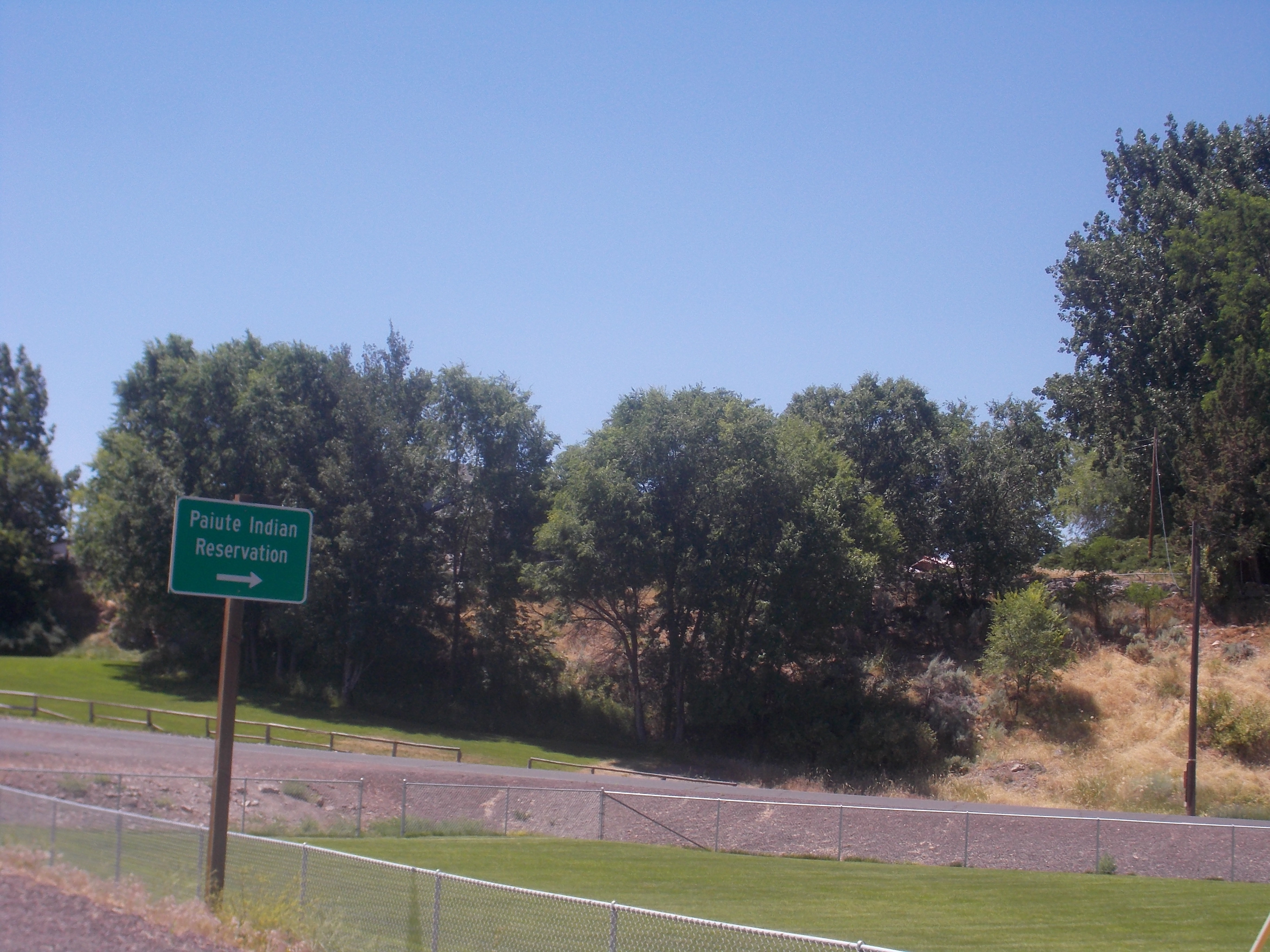
Sign for the "Paiute Indian Reservation" in Burns

The tribe owns 13,736 acres (55.59 km^{2}) in acres in reservation and trust land, all of it in Harney County, Oregon. The tribe also holds about 10 acres (40,000 m^{2}) (the "Old Camp"), located about a half-mile west of Burns. The tribe also holds 71 scattered allotments about 25 miles (40 km) east of the Burns city limits.

The tribe's reservation is the Burns Paiute Reservation and Trust Lands, also known as the Burns Paiute Indian Colony, located north of the city of Burns.

The tribe's reservation, split into two tracts, was established by Public Law 92-488 on October 13, 1972. In 1935, an additional 760.32 acres (3.0769 km^{2}) acres was purchased for the tribe under Section 208 of the National Industrial Recovery Act of 1933; this land lies northwest of the City of Burns.

== Demographics ==
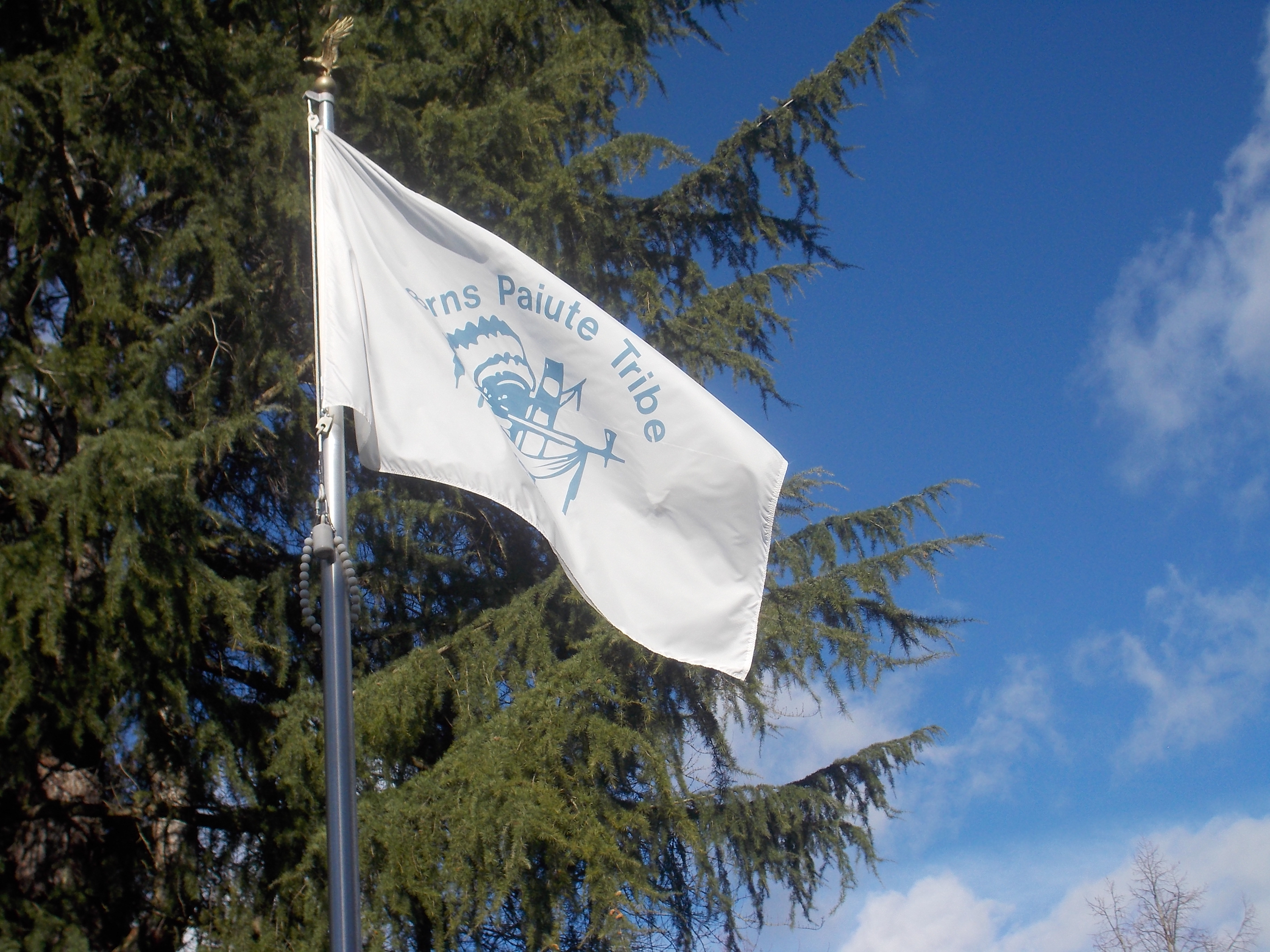
Tribal flag flying at the Walk of Flags near the State Capitol

In 1985, there were 223 tribal members.

In 1990, 151 tribal members lived on the reservation; in 1992, 356 people were enrolled in the tribe.

In 2008, there were 341 enrolled members of the tribe (about a third of whom lived on the reservation), making them the smallest federally recognized tribe in Oregon.

According to the Oregon Blue Book (accessed in January 2016), there are 349 members of the tribe.

== Language ==
The Burns Paiutes traditionally spoke the Northern Paiute language, which is part of the Western Numic branch of the Uto-Aztecan language family.

== Culture ==
Traditionally, the Paiutes used willow, sagebrush, tule plant and Indian hemp to make baskets as well as sandals, fishing nets, and traps. They also made beads and drums, activities which are still continued today.

Tribal members have taken part in an oral history project to gather memories of tribal elders.

The tribe celebrates an Annual Mother's Day Powwow. The tribe also celebrates its Reservation Day Festival and Powwow on October 13 each year, in honor of the anniversary of the date when the land held in trust for the tribe became a reservation.

== Education ==
The reservation is served by Harney County School District 3. The district's comprehensive high school is Burns High School.

== Tribal government and employees ==
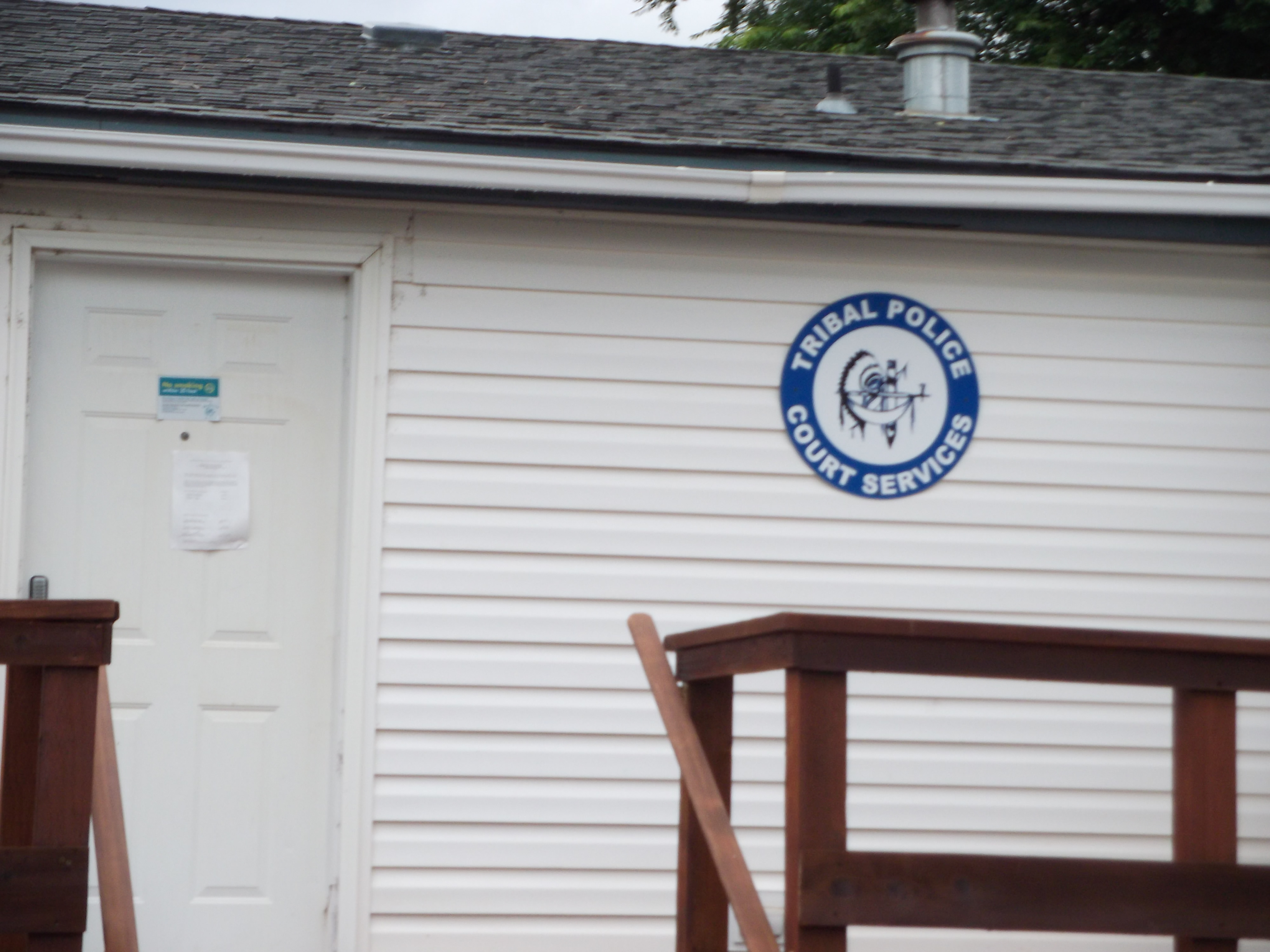
Tribal police

The Constitution and Bylaws of the Burns Paiute Colony was adopted on May 16, 1968. The Constitution and Bylaws created the General Council, a body consisting of all qualified voters (i.e., tribal members 18 years of age or older who live on the reservation or are absentee voters). The General Council meets twice a year for deliberation and voting on matters of importance.

The General Council also nominates and elects a seven-person tribal council to handle the day-to-day affairs of the tribe. The tribal council meets several times a month, and council members serve three-year terms. (The tribal council was created by an amendment to the Constitution and Bylaws in 1988; the council replaced a five-member business council). The council consists of a chair, vice-chair, secretary, sergeant at arms, and three members at large.

There is a tribal police force and tribal court, consisting of a tribal judge and associate judge.

According to the Oregon Blue Book, the tribe employs 54 people. Tribal employees are organized into nine departments, each dealing with a particular area, such as health, education, the environment and energy, cultural preservation and enhancement, and law enforcement.

In 2009, the tribe became the first Native American community to complete full weatherization and installation of energy-efficient lightbulbs in all reservation housing.

== Economy ==
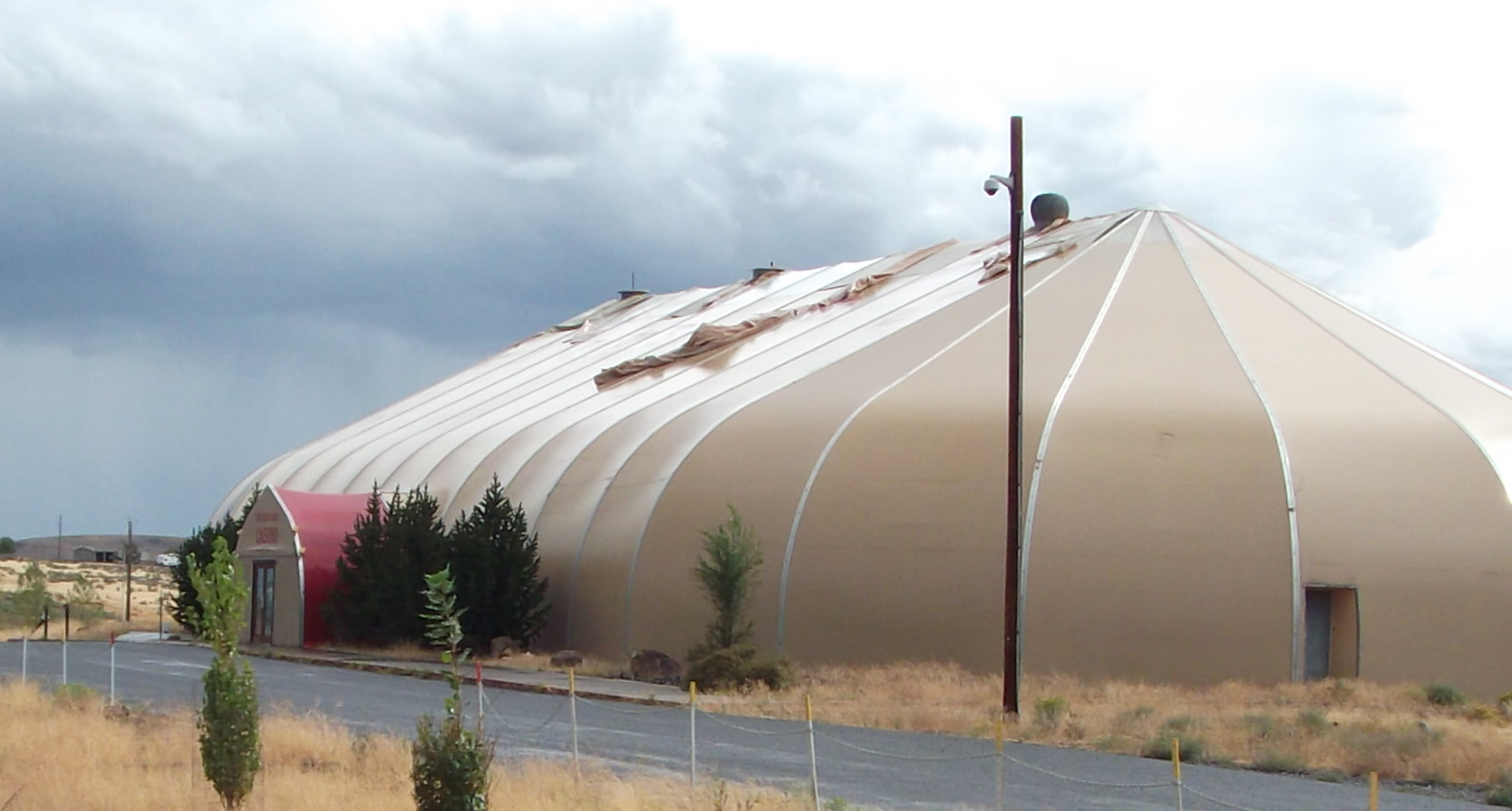
The defunct Old Camp Casino, owned by the tribe

For economic development, the Burns Paiute created the Old Camp Casino outside Burns. The facility was 17,000 square feet (1,600 m^{2}) in area and opened in 1998. It included a casino, the Sa-Wa-Be Restaurant, a bingo hall, an arcade, a gift shop, conference facilities, an RV park, and other amenities. The tribe closed the casino on November 26, 2012, due to safety concerns stemming from structural problems with the building.
