= Harney County School District 3 =

School district in Oregon, United States

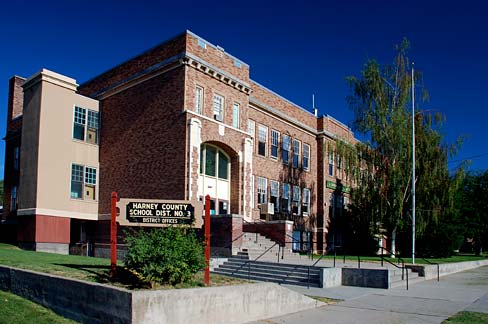
Former Harney County School District 3 headquarters

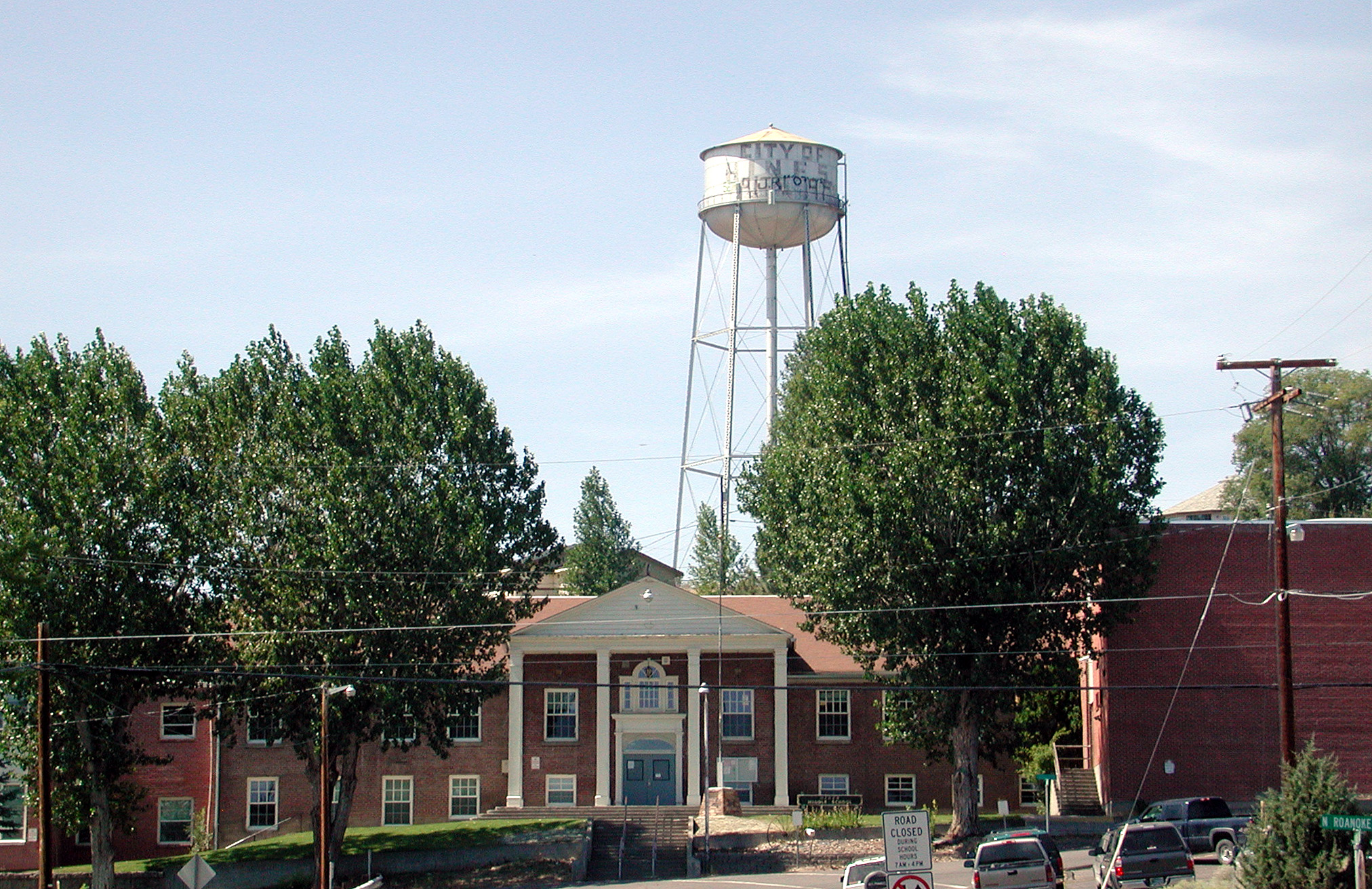
Hines Middle School

Harney County School District 3 (HCSD3) is a school district headquartered in Burns, Oregon. It includes Burns and Hines, as well as Harney. The reservation of the Burns Paiute Tribe is in this district.

== History ==
The school district was established in 1989 when the Burns Union High School District, the Burns Elementary School District, and the Hines Elementary School District merged. On Tuesday, May 6, 1975, there was a referendum to combine those three districts, along with the Double O and Suntex school districts. 600 people voted against that proposal, and 331 people voted for it.

In 2016 Steve Quick was hired as superintendent. He previously was at the Oroville School District of Oroville, Washington.

Previously the Harney Educational Service District (Harney ESD) provided some services to the school district. In 2019 HCSD3 's board voted to begin doing these services in-house, with Harney ESD services ending June 30 of that year.

Quick resigned and left his position on August 8, 2022. Robert Medley became a new superintendent on July 1, 2023.

== Schools ==
- Burns High School (Burns)
- Hines Middle School (Hines) - It was built in 1930.
- Henry L. Slater Elementary School (Burns) - Its namesake is a former principal. Built in 1948, it was at first known as Burns Grade School, but received its current name in 1971, the year the namesake retired.

Special schools

- Monroe School - The school of the Eastern Oregon Youth Correctional Facility of the Oregon Youth Authority.

The district previously operated Lincoln Junior High School, which received that name circa 1965. By 2004 it closed, and the district began using it as its headquarters. The district planned to stop using it as its headquarters with employees being relocated in September 2021. The school district sold the building to the county.
