= Hines, Oregon =

- City
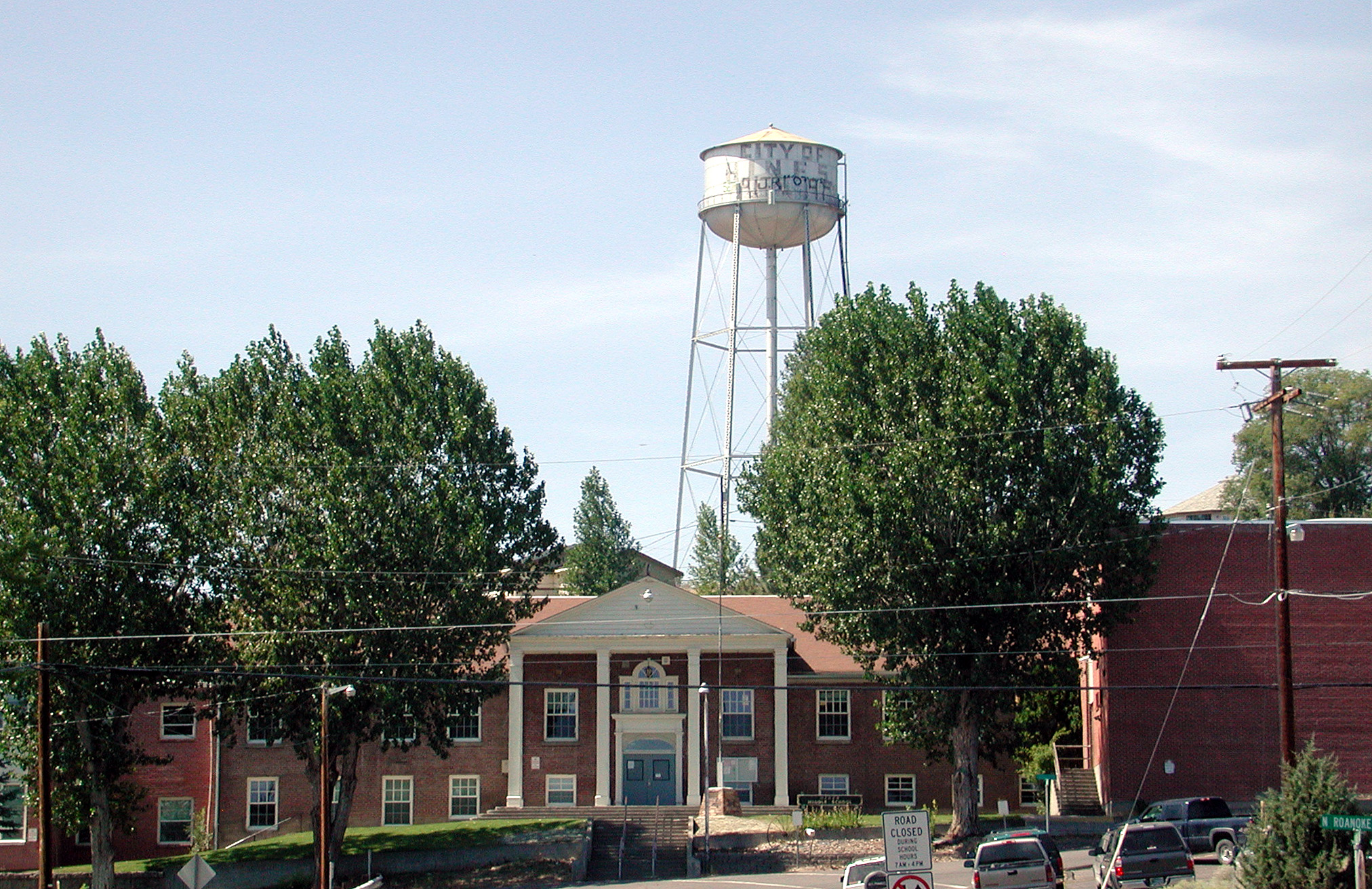
- Hines Middle School and water tower

- Location in Oregon
- Coordinates: 43°33′33″N 119°5′0″W
- Country: United States
- State: Oregon
- County: Harney
- Incorporated: 1930

Area
  - Total: 2.12 sq mi (5.48 km^{2})
  - Land: 2.06 sq mi (5.34 km^{2})
  - Water: 0.050 sq mi (0.13 km^{2})
- Elevation: 4,150 ft (1,260 m)

Population (2020)
  - Total: 1,645
  - Density: 797.2/sq mi (307.81/km^{2})
- Time zone: UTC-8 (Pacific)
  - Summer (DST): UTC-7 (Pacific)
- ZIP code: 97738
- Area code: 541
- FIPS code: 41-34250
- GNIS feature ID: 2410768
- Website: www.cityofhines.gov

Hines is a city in Harney County, Oregon, United States. As of the 2020 census, Hines had a population of 1,645.

== History ==
A community named Herrick was formed just southwest of Burns when railroad promoter and sawmill operator Fred Herrick founded a lumber company there. Edward Hines bought the railroad and lumber company from Herrick in 1928, and a post office named Hines was established in 1931 to serve the Edward Hines Lumber Company mill and surrounding community. The mill has since changed hands at least two more times. The mill closed in 2006.

== Geography ==
According to the United States Census Bureau, the city has a total area of 2.13 square miles (5.52 km^{2}), of which, 2.08 square miles (5.39 km^{2}) is land and 0.05 square miles (0.13 km^{2}) is water.

== Demographics ==
Historical population
Census	Pop.	Note	%±
1940	677		—
1950	918		35.6%
1960	1,207		31.5%
1970	1,407		16.6%
1980	1,632		16.0%
1990	1,452		−11.0%
2000	1,664		14.6%
2010	1,563		−6.1%
2020	1,645		5.2%
U.S. Decennial Census

=== 2020 census ===
As of the 2020 census, the city had a population of 1,645. The median age was 44.4 years. 23.1% of residents were under the age of 18 and 26.3% of residents were 65 years of age or older. For every 100 females there were 95.4 males, and for every 100 females age 18 and over there were 87.4 males age 18 and over.

92.9% of residents lived in urban areas, while 7.1% lived in rural areas.

There were 676 households in the city, of which 28.7% had children under the age of 18 living in them. Of all households, 46.9% were married-couple households, 17.9% were households with a male householder and no spouse or partner present, and 28.7% were households with a female householder and no spouse or partner present. About 32.4% of all households were made up of individuals and 15.8% had someone living alone who was 65 years of age or older.

There were 723 housing units, of which 6.5% were vacant. Among occupied housing units, 68.2% were owner-occupied and 31.8% were renter-occupied. The homeowner vacancy rate was 0.4% and the rental vacancy rate was 3.6%.

Racial composition as of the 2020 census
Race	Number	Percent
White	1,461	88.8%
Black or African American	0	0%
American Indian and Alaska Native	34	2.1%
Asian	6	0.4%
Native Hawaiian and Other Pacific Islander	0	0%
Some other race	30	1.8%
Two or more races	114	6.9%
Hispanic or Latino (of any race)	99	6.0%

=== 2010 census ===
As of the census of 2010, there were 1,563 people, 678 households, and 423 families living in the city. The population density was 751.4 inhabitants per square mile (290.1/km^{2}). There were 738 housing units at an average density of 354.8 per square mile (137.0/km^{2}). The racial makeup of the city was 94.9% White, 0.3% African American, 1.0% Native American, 0.4% Asian, 1.2% from other races, and 2.4% from two or more races. Hispanic or Latino of any race were 3.1% of the population.

There were 678 households, of which 28.8% had children under the age of 18 living with them, 49.7% were married couples living together, 9.9% had a female householder with no husband present, 2.8% had a male householder with no wife present, and 37.6% were non-families. 32.0% of all households were made up of individuals, and 17.9% had someone living alone who was 65 years of age or older. The average household size was 2.25 and the average family size was 2.83.

The median age in the city was 42.5 years. 24.1% of residents were under the age of 18; 6% were between the ages of 18 and 24; 21.8% were from 25 to 44; 28.2% were from 45 to 64; and 19.8% were 65 years of age or older. The gender makeup of the city was 49.6% male and 50.4% female.

=== 2000 census ===
As of the census of 2000, there were 1,623 people, 641 households, and 473 families living in the city. The population density was 684.8 inhabitants per square mile (264.4/km^{2}). There were 689 housing units at an average density of 290.7 per square mile (112.2/km^{2}). The racial makeup of the city was 94.39% White, 0.12% African American, 2.71% Native American, 0.55% Asian, 0.06% Pacific Islander, 0.12% from other races, and 2.03% from two or more races. Hispanic or Latino of any race were 1.66% of the population.

There were 641 households, out of which 31.8% had children under the age of 18 living with them, 63.5% were married couples living together, 6.4% had a female householder with no husband present, and 26.2% were non-families. 21.8% of all households were made up of individuals, and 8.7% had someone living alone who was 65 years of age or older. The average household size was 2.50 and the average family size was 2.89.

In the city, the population was dispersal was 26.6% under the age of 18, 6.3% from 18 to 24, 27.0% from 25 to 44, 26.1% from 45 to 64, and 14.0% who were 65 years of age or older. The median age was 40 years. For every 100 females, there were 106.5 males. For every 100 females age 18 and over, there were 98.7 males.

The median income for a household in the city was $40,917, and the median income for a family was $43,452. Males had a median income of $32,772 versus $22,458 for females. The per capita income for the city was $15,783. About 6.6% of families and 9.9% of the population were below the poverty line, including 10.1% of those under age 18 and 17.3% of those age 65 or over.

== Transportation ==
Haney County Senior & Community Services Center operates the Dial-A-Ride, which provides a local bus route between Burns and Hines.

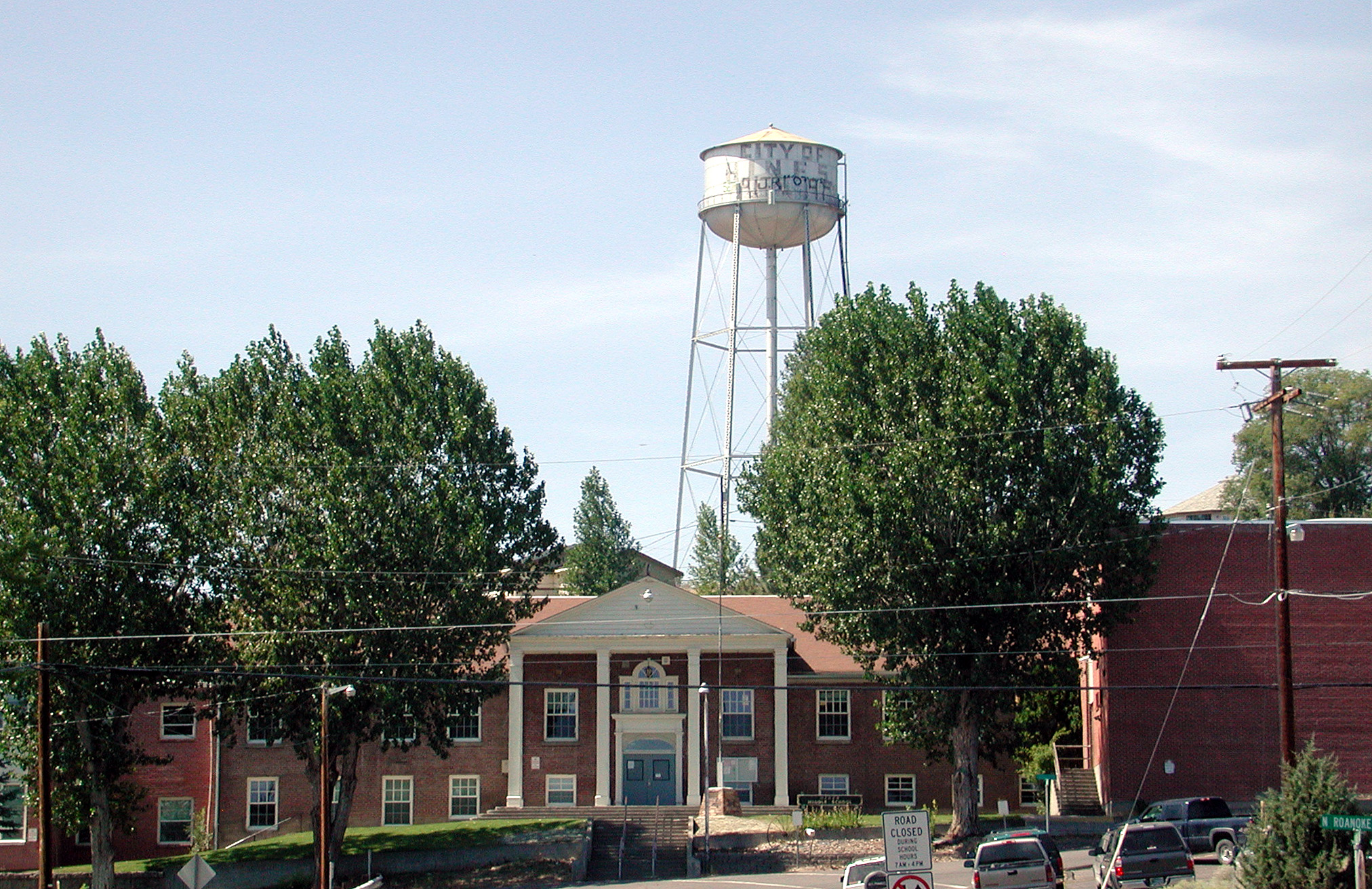
Hines Middle School

== Education ==
Hines is in Harney County School District 3. Its schools are Slater Elementary School (in Burns), Hines Middle School (in Hines), and Burns High School.

Hines previously had its own elementary school district, with a separate Burns-based high school district. A 1975 proposal to merge those districts, along with the elementary school district of Burns and two other school districts, was turned down by voters. In 1989, the Burns high school district and the Burns and Hines elementary school districts combined into Harney County School District 3.

Harney County is not in a community college district but has a "contract out of district" (COD) with Treasure Valley Community College. TVCC operates the Burns Outreach Center in Burns.
