= Burns, Oregon =

- City
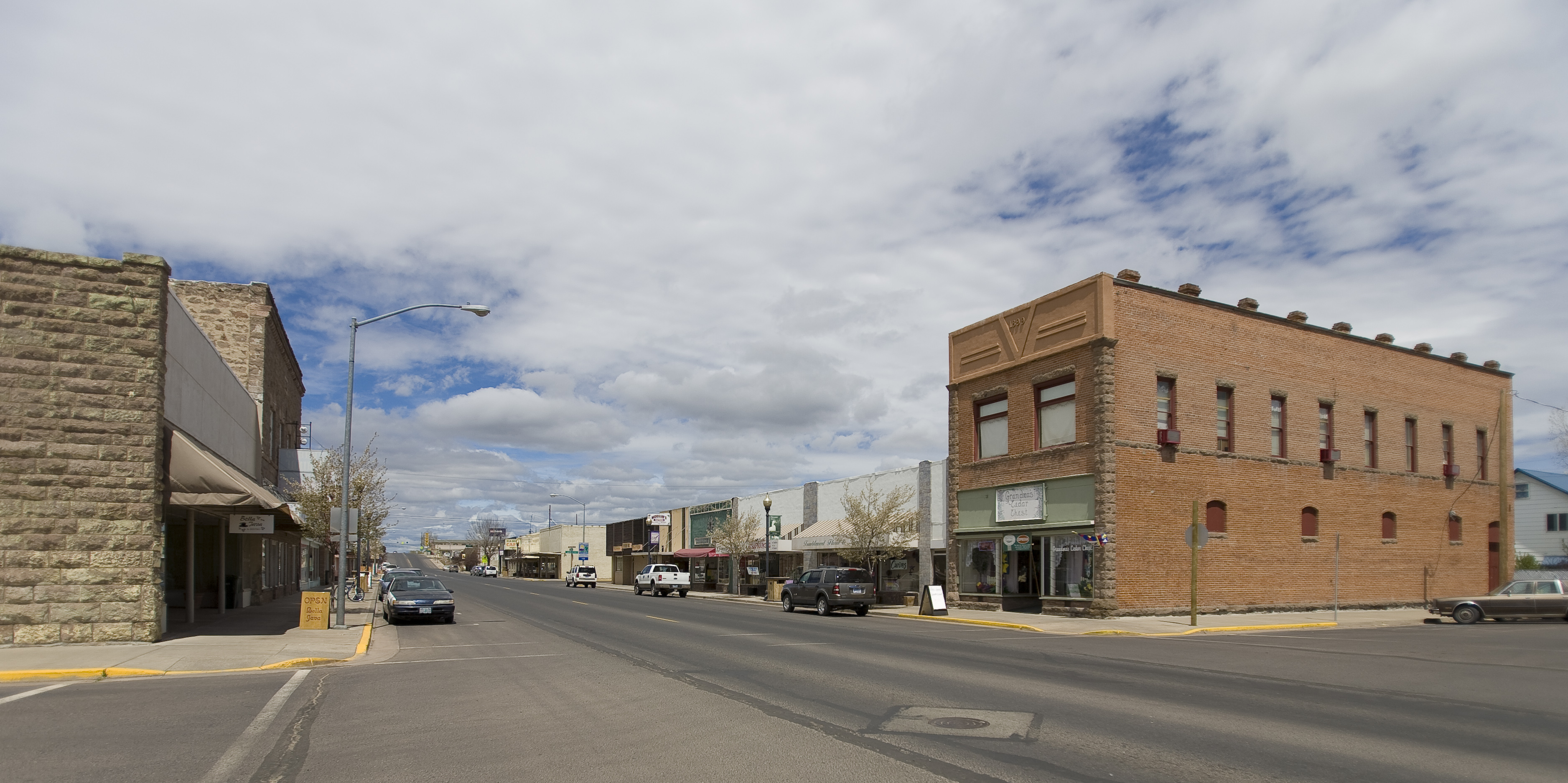
- North Broadway Avenue (2008)

- Location within Harney County and Oregon

- Location within the United States
- Coordinates: 43°35′18″N 119°03′41″W
- Country: United States
- State: Oregon
- County: Harney
- Incorporated: 1891

Government
  - Mayor: Jen Hoke

Area
  - Total: 3.55 sq mi (9.20 km^{2})
  - Land: 3.55 sq mi (9.20 km^{2})
  - Water: 0 sq mi (0.00 km^{2})
- Elevation: 4,190 ft (1,280 m)

Population (2020)
  - Total: 2,730
  - Density: 769/sq mi (296.9/km^{2})
- U.S. Census
- Time zone: UTC-8 (Pacific)
  - Summer (DST): UTC-7 (Pacific)
- ZIP code: 97720
- Area code: 541
- FIPS code: 41-09800
- GNIS feature ID: 2409949
- Website: City of Burns Oregon

Burns is a city in and the county seat of Harney County, in the U.S. state of Oregon. According to the 2020 census, the population was 2,730. Burns and the nearby city of Hines are home to about 60 percent of the people in the sparsely populated county, by area the largest in Oregon and the tenth largest in the United States.

The Burns–Hines region has a high-desert climate but was much wetter in the recent geologic past. The Harney Basin was the largest of many depressions in which lakes formed in southeastern Oregon during the late Pleistocene. Remnants of an ancient lake that reached as far north as Burns are at the center of the Malheur National Wildlife Refuge, south of the city.

Northern Paiutes or their ancestors, who were hunter-gatherers, have lived in the region for thousands of years. Since the arrival of Euro-Americans in the 19th century, cattle ranching and other forms of agriculture have dominated land use in the area. In 1930, logging in the mountains north of Burns led to the creation of Hines, a lumber company town, and the timber industry remained important to the local economy until the 1990s. In addition to ranching, a variety of private and public enterprises support the Burns–Hines economy in the 21st century. Annual events include a migratory bird festival, the county fair, and a country music jamboree.

== History ==
=== Tribal ===
Archeologists have found evidence of human habitation in the general vicinity of Burns that pushed the possibility of human habitation from the previous estimate of 10,000 to 18,000 years ago. Members of the contemporary Burns Paiute Tribe of Harney County, descended mainly from the Wadatika band of Paiutes, were hunter-gatherers throughout central and southern Oregon. The Wadatikas were named after the wada seeds collected as food from near Malheur Lake. Their territory covered about 5,300 square miles (14,000 km^{2}) from the Cascade Range to near Boise and from the southern Blue Mountains to south of Steens Mountain. Scattered in the 19th century by clashes with white settlers and soldiers and through forced removal to distant reservations, some of the Paiutes eventually returned to Harney County.

In the 1930s, the Burns Paiute Tribe began buying land near Burns and holding tribal elections. By the late 1960s, the tribe had adopted a constitution and tribal bylaws, and in 1972 the Burns Paiute formally became an independent tribe, eligible to enter into contracts with other governments and legal entities. The tribe owns the Burns Paiute Reservation, 770 acres (310 ha) north of Burns, and individual members of the tribe own more than 11,000 acres (4,500 ha) of land elsewhere in the county. In 1991, the tribe had about 350 members, and about 200 lived on the reservation.

=== Cities and ranches ===
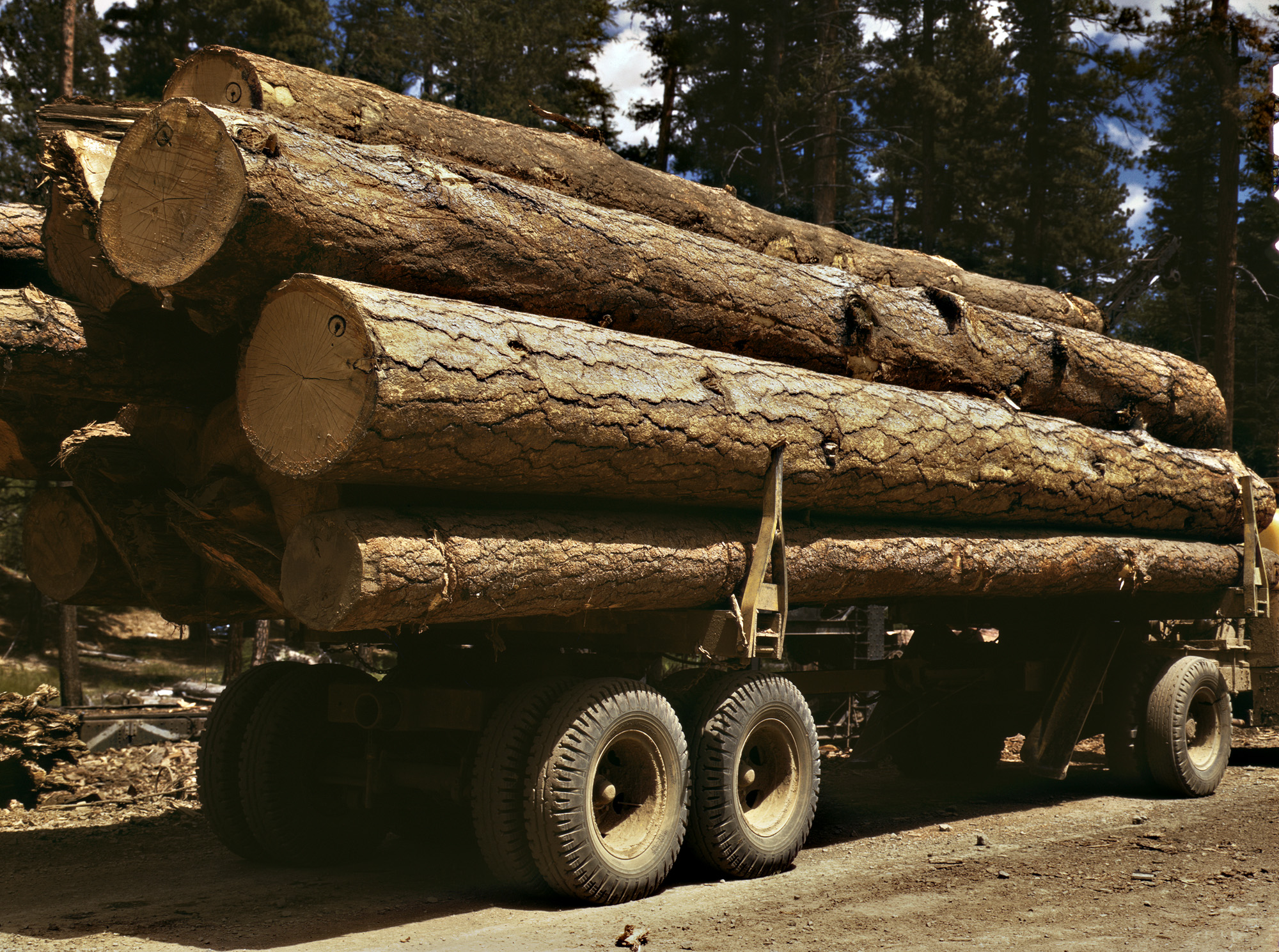
1942: Ponderosa pine logs from the Hines tract in the Malheur National Forest

After the arrival of Euro-American settlers in the 19th century, Burns was established in the 1880s. It was formally incorporated after Harney County's creation in 1889 through the splitting of Grant County into two counties. Early settler, merchant, and county commissioner George McGowan named the city after the Scottish poet Robert Burns. By 1891, the community had stores, a post office, hotels, and other businesses. McGowan was the town's first postmaster.

In the 1920s, timber cutting and milling brought many newcomers to the region. In 1928, the Edward Hines Lumber Company acquired from the U.S. Forest Service the rights to cut timber in the Blue Mountains near Seneca, north of Burns. After winning the timber contract, the Hines Company built the 52-mile (84 km) Oregon and Northwestern Railroad between Burns and Seneca. Edward Hines, the company owner, built a lumber mill and company town, incorporated as the City of Hines in 1930. Timber and logging remained important to the local economy until the 1990s, when the area's last lumber mill closed for lack of timber.

Cattle ranching in the region began as early as the 1860s and expanded after passage of the Desert Land Act of 1877. The act promoted development of arid and semi-arid public land in the western United States by making 320-acre (130 ha) plots available to individuals willing to "reclaim, irrigate, and cultivate" the land. Some of the Harney County ranches established in the 19th century still exist in the 21st. Agricultural revenue for Harney County in 2011 totaled about $84 million. Of this, about 65 percent came from cattle sales, 29 percent from the sale of alfalfa hay, and most of the rest from other crops and the sale of horses.

== Geography ==
Harney County is the largest county in Oregon and the tenth largest in the United States. It covers about 10,000 square miles (26,000 km^{2}) but has a total population of only about 7,600. Most of that population lives in Burns or Hines, about 2 miles (3 km) southwest of Burns. Burns had about 2,800 residents in 2010 and Hines about 1,600, for a total of 4,400, nearly 60 percent of the county population.

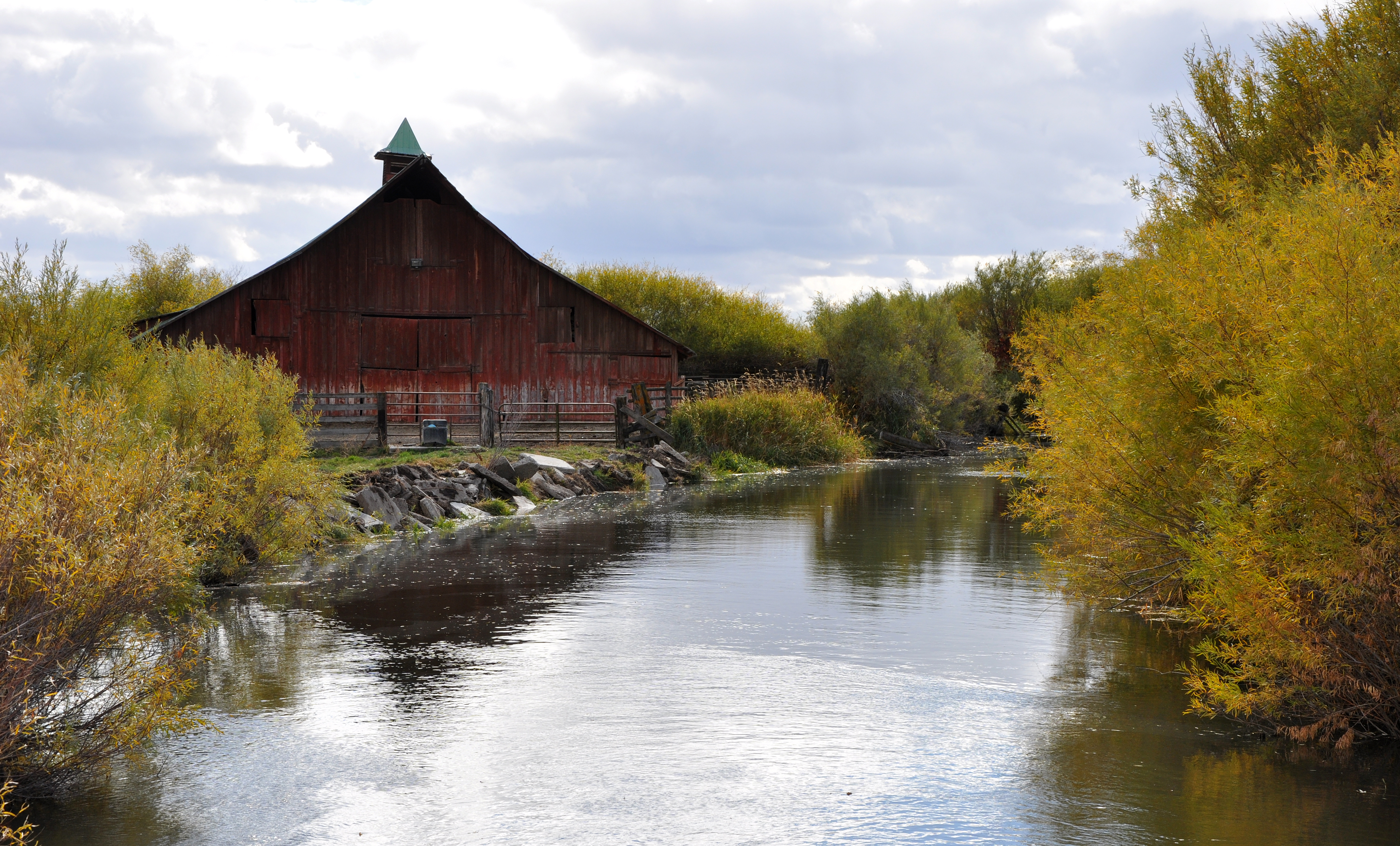
Silvies River east of Burns along Oregon Route 78

The city is 132 miles (212 km) east of Bend, and 132 miles (212 km) west of Ontario, Oregon, on U.S. Route 20 at its intersection with U.S. Route 395. Burns is about 200 miles (322 km) south of Pendleton. Oregon Route 78 runs between Burns and communities to the southeast including Crane, Princeton, and Burns Junction, about 100 miles (161 km) away. A fourth highway, Oregon Route 205, links the city to the Malheur National Wildlife Refuge, 36 miles (58 km) to the south, and to Frenchglen, further south near Steens Mountain.

According to the United States Census Bureau, the city has a total area of 3.55 square miles (9.19 km^{2}), all land.

=== Geology ===
Burns is in southeastern Oregon near the northern edge of the arid Harney Basin. The basin is part of the High Lava Plains, a region dominated by erupting volcanoes in the late Miocene, five to ten million years ago. Centered on the Brothers Fault Zone, which runs southeast–northwest between Steens Mountain and Bend, the High Lava Plains merge with the Blue Mountains to the north and the Basin and Range Province to the south.

Shallow basins formed by crustal stretching in the Basin and Range province were much wetter during the late Pleistocene, up to 11,000 years ago, than they are in the 21st century. Lakes formed in these basins, including those in the southern part of the High Lava Plains. Among these, the largest depression was the Harney Basin, covering 5,300 square miles (14,000 km^{2}). Within the Harney Basin, ancient Malheur Lake—the 21st-century remnants of which include Malheur Lake, Harney Lake, and Mud Lake—covered 900 square miles (2,300 km^{2}) and extended as far north as Burns. These remnant wetlands have become the Malheur National Wildlife Refuge.

=== Climate ===
Burns has a semi-arid continental climate (Köppen BSk) bordering upon a continental Mediterranean climate (Dsb) that averages 99 days with precipitation each year. Cloud cover varies from an average of 25 percent in July to 76 percent in January. Normal annual precipitation amounts to about 11 inches or 279 millimetres, including 34 inches or 86 centimetres of snow. The average relative humidity, measured at 4 p.m. daily, is 42 percent, varying from 21 percent in July to 68 percent in December and January. The normal monthly daily average temperature ranges from about 24 °F (−4 °C) in December to 67 °F (19 °C) in July. On average, highs reach 90 °F (32 °C) on 24 days annually and stay at or below the freezing mark on 31 days, while lows fall to or below 0 °F (−18 °C) on an average of 11 nights. The average first and last occurrences of freezing temperatures are September 2 and June 21, respectively, allowing a growing season of 72 days.

In January 1950, during a series of snowstorms the National Weather Service has identified as one of Oregon's top 10 weather events of the 20th century, about 32 inches (81 cm) of snow fell on Burns. During another top-10 event, which occurred in February 1933, the temperature at Seneca reached −54 °F (−48 °C), the lowest ever recorded in Oregon. By highway, Seneca is about 45 miles (72 km) north of Burns in the Blue Mountains. At Burns itself, record temperatures since 1939 range from −30 °F (−34 °C) on December 8, 2013, up to 107 °F (42 °C) on July 12, 2002; the record low maximum is −3 °F (−19 °C) on January 6, 1982, and December 21, 1990, while the record high minimum is 73 °F (23 °C) on July 27 and 30, 1939.

In late March and early April 2025, the Silvies River overflowed its banks, breached a levy, inundated parts of the city, overwhelming its sewer system. About 1,400 people were asked to evacuate from Burns and the Burns Paiute Reservation during the height of the flood. Rapid snow melt along recent forest-fire burn scars upstream of the city contributed to the flood.

Climate data for Burns, Oregon (1991–2020 normals, (Note: Mean monthly maxima and minima (i.e. the expected highest and lowest temperature readings at any point during the year or given month) calculated based on data at said location from 1991 to 2020.) extremes 1939–present)
| Month | Jan | Feb | Mar | Apr | May | Jun | Jul | Aug | Sep | Oct | Nov | Dec | Year |
|---|---|---|---|---|---|---|---|---|---|---|---|---|---|
| Record high °F (°C) | 58 (14) | 67 (19) | 76 (24) | 86 (30) | 94 (34) | 102 (39) | 107 (42) | 104 (40) | 102 (39) | 91 (33) | 71 (22) | 61 (16) | 107 (42) |
| Mean maximum °F (°C) | 47.9 (8.8) | 52.1 (11.2) | 66.4 (19.1) | 75.0 (23.9) | 84.7 (29.3) | 91.8 (33.2) | 98.2 (36.8) | 97.2 (36.2) | 91.4 (33.0) | 79.9 (26.6) | 63.5 (17.5) | 49.1 (9.5) | 99.3 (37.4) |
| Mean daily maximum °F (°C) | 36.7 (2.6) | 41.7 (5.4) | 51.1 (10.6) | 58.1 (14.5) | 68.2 (20.1) | 76.7 (24.8) | 88.7 (31.5) | 87.2 (30.7) | 78.2 (25.7) | 63.1 (17.3) | 47.3 (8.5) | 36.4 (2.4) | 61.1 (16.2) |
| Daily mean °F (°C) | 26.5 (−3.1) | 31.0 (−0.6) | 38.7 (3.7) | 43.9 (6.6) | 52.8 (11.6) | 59.7 (15.4) | 68.6 (20.3) | 66.5 (19.2) | 57.8 (14.3) | 45.6 (7.6) | 34.7 (1.5) | 25.9 (−3.4) | 46.0 (7.8) |
| Mean daily minimum °F (°C) | 16.3 (−8.7) | 20.2 (−6.6) | 26.3 (−3.2) | 29.8 (−1.2) | 37.4 (3.0) | 42.6 (5.9) | 48.6 (9.2) | 45.8 (7.7) | 37.4 (3.0) | 28.0 (−2.2) | 22.1 (−5.5) | 15.5 (−9.2) | 30.8 (−0.7) |
| Mean minimum °F (°C) | −5.0 (−20.6) | 2.6 (−16.3) | 11.7 (−11.3) | 17.4 (−8.1) | 21.6 (−5.8) | 28.2 (−2.1) | 36.3 (2.4) | 32.7 (0.4) | 23.6 (−4.7) | 12.0 (−11.1) | 2.6 (−16.3) | −6.0 (−21.1) | −12.7 (−24.8) |
| Record low °F (°C) | −27 (−33) | −28 (−33) | −14 (−26) | 10 (−12) | 13 (−11) | 21 (−6) | 25 (−4) | 22 (−6) | 17 (−8) | −7 (−22) | −17 (−27) | −30 (−34) | −30 (−34) |
| Average precipitation inches (mm) | 1.33 (34) | 0.95 (24) | 0.96 (24) | 0.94 (24) | 1.27 (32) | 0.73 (19) | 0.29 (7.4) | 0.25 (6.4) | 0.38 (9.7) | 0.77 (20) | 1.02 (26) | 1.52 (39) | 10.41 (265.5) |
| Average snowfall inches (cm) | 5.6 (14) | 6.7 (17) | 3.8 (9.7) | 0.7 (1.8) | 0.2 (0.51) | 0.0 (0.0) | 0.0 (0.0) | 0.0 (0.0) | 0.0 (0.0) | 0.4 (1.0) | 6.0 (15) | 10.6 (27) | 34.0 (86) |
| Average precipitation days (≥ 0.01 in) | 10.4 | 10.0 | 10.7 | 9.5 | 9.2 | 5.2 | 2.7 | 2.4 | 3.3 | 6.1 | 10.1 | 11.8 | 91.4 |
| Average snowy days (≥ 0.1 in) | 6.0 | 5.6 | 4.3 | 1.4 | 0.4 | 0.0 | 0.0 | 0.0 | 0.0 | 0.8 | 5.3 | 7.3 | 31.1 |
Source 1: NOAA
Source 2: NOAA NCEI (snow/snow days 1981–2010)

== Demographics ==
Historical population
| Census | Pop. | Note | %± |
|---|---|---|---|
| 1890 | 264 | | — |
| 1900 | 547 | | 107.2% |
| 1910 | 904 | | 65.3% |
| 1920 | 1,022 | | 13.1% |
| 1930 | 2,599 | | 154.3% |
| 1940 | 2,566 | | −1.3% |
| 1950 | 3,093 | | 20.5% |
| 1960 | 3,523 | | 13.9% |
| 1970 | 3,293 | | −6.5% |
| 1980 | 3,579 | | 8.7% |
| 1990 | 2,913 | | −18.6% |
| 2000 | 3,064 | | 5.2% |
| 2010 | 2,806 | | −8.4% |
| 2020 | 2,730 | | −2.7% |

=== 2020 census ===
As of the 2020 census, Burns had a population of 2,730. The median age was 44.3 years. 21.3% of residents were under the age of 18 and 23.6% were 65 years of age or older. For every 100 females there were 103.0 males, and for every 100 females age 18 and over there were 98.0 males age 18 and over.

90.4% of residents lived in urban areas, while 9.6% lived in rural areas.

There were 1,242 households in Burns, of which 23.6% had children under the age of 18 living in them. Of all households, 38.2% were married-couple households, 25.1% were households with a male householder and no spouse or partner present, and 28.2% were households with a female householder and no spouse or partner present. About 36.9% of all households were made up of individuals and 17.0% had someone living alone who was 65 years of age or older.

There were 1,407 housing units, of which 11.7% were vacant. Among occupied housing units, 60.5% were owner-occupied and 39.5% were renter-occupied. The homeowner vacancy rate was 2.8% and the rental vacancy rate was 8.4%.

Racial composition as of the 2020 census
| Race | Number | Percent |
|---|---|---|
| White | 2,351 | 86.1% |
| Black or African American | 6 | 0.2% |
| American Indian and Alaska Native | 95 | 3.5% |
| Asian | 23 | 0.8% |
| Native Hawaiian and Other Pacific Islander | 0 | 0% |
| Some other race | 37 | 1.4% |
| Two or more races | 218 | 8.0% |
| Hispanic or Latino (of any race) | 178 | 6.5% |

=== 2010 census ===
As of the 2010 census, there were 2,806 people, 1,280 households, and 720 families residing in the city. The population density was 790.4 inhabitants per square mile (305.2/km^{2}). There were 1,490 housing units at an average density of 419.7 per square mile (162.0/km^{2}). The racial makeup of the city was 92.2% White, 0.3% African American, 2.6% Native American, 0.7% Asian, 0.7% from other races, and 3.3% from two or more races. Hispanic or Latino of any race were 4.7% of the population.

There were 1,280 households, out of which 24.4% had children under the age of 18 living with them, 40.6% were married couples living together, 11.5% had a female householder with no husband present, 4.1% had a male householder with no wife present, and 43.8% were non-families. 36.9% of all households were made up of individuals, and 13.9% had someone living alone who was 65 years of age or older. The average household size was 2.13 and the average family size was 2.77.

The median age in the city was 44.5 years. 21.5% of residents were under the age of 18; 8.7% were between the ages of 18 and 24; 20.3% were from 25 to 44; 30.7% were from 45 to 64; and 18.9% were 65 years of age or older. The gender makeup of the city was 51.2% male and 48.8% female.

The median income for a household in the city was $32,877, and the median income for a family was $42,885. The per capita income for the city was $19,567. About 19.6% of families and 20% of the population had incomes below the poverty line.

== Arts and culture ==
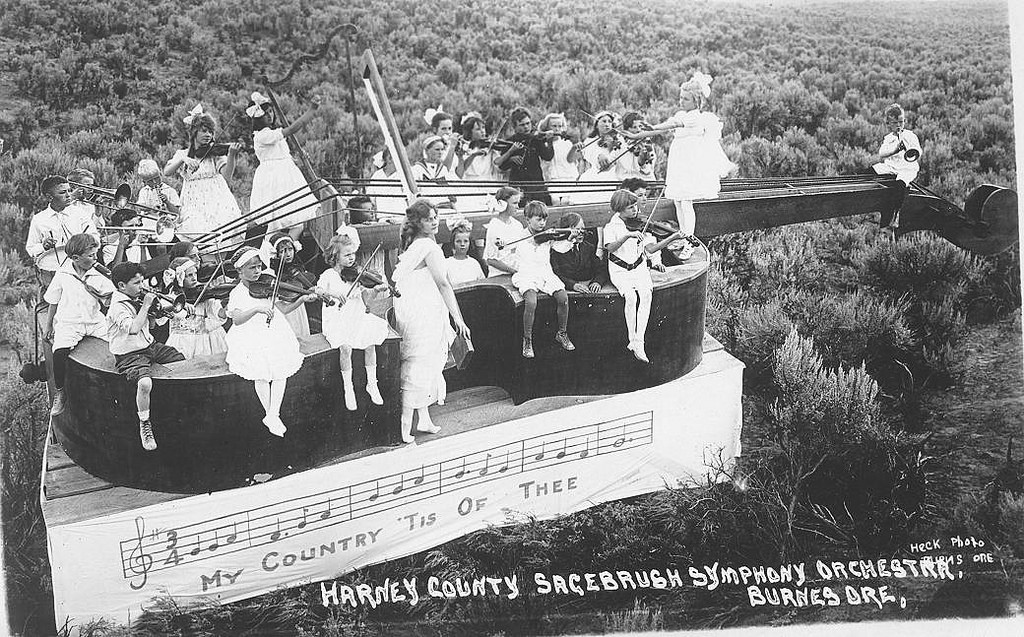
Sagebrush Symphony Orchestra in about 1915

The Harney County Arts in Education Foundation (HCAEF) exists to support music education and the performing, visual, and theater arts in Burns and the region. The HCAEF is raising funds in hopes of creating a performing arts and education center with a 600-seat auditorium, art gallery, film studio, and other facilities for students and the community. The Portland Youth Philharmonic, which originated in Burns as the Sagebrush Symphony Orchestra, has performed in Burns in support of the HCAEF.

Each April, Burns hosts the John Scharff Migratory Bird Festival and Art Show during the annual spring migration of waterfowl and other birds through the area. Pelicans, ducks, and raptors are among the birds frequenting the Harney Basin wetlands, a stopping place on the Pacific Flyway. Named for a former manager of the Malheur National Wildlife Refuge, the festival includes tours of the wetlands and nearby ranches as well as classes in topics such as birdhouse building, Harney County archeology, and bird sketching.

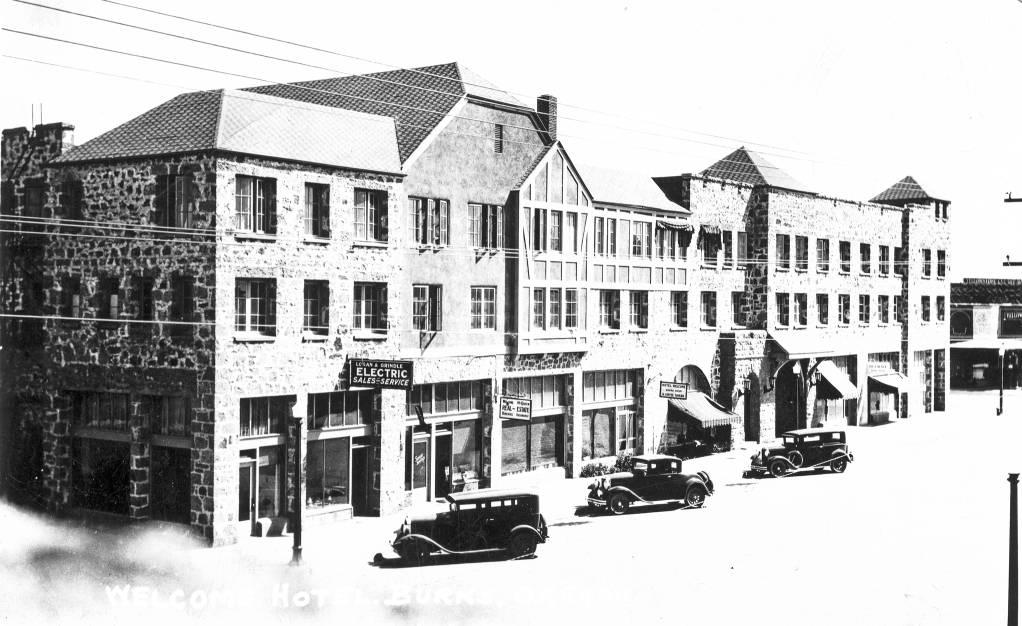
The Welcome Hotel in Burns, 1930. It burned down in 1939.

In June, the High Desert Fiddlers host the Country Music Jamboree at the Harney County Fairgrounds on the edge of Burns. Players of all skill levels take part in the jamboree, with stages in three fairground buildings. Admission is free; donations are accepted. Concessions, dinners by reservation, camping in tents or recreational vehicles, and dancing are part of the entertainment. At other times of the year, the High Desert Fiddlers gather on Fridays at various locations around the city to hold public jam sessions including folk, country, bluegrass, and other music played on instruments such as the guitar, mandolin, fiddle, and hammered dulcimer.

The Harney County Fair is held annually in September at the Harney County Fairgrounds. The fair, which lasts about a week, includes a rodeo, carnival, talent show, horse races, parade, and other events, including those sponsored by 4-H and Future Farmers of America.

The Harney County Historical Museum in Burns offers displays of relics, documents, and photographs from the region's past. Established in 1960 at the site of a former brewery, laundry, and wrecking yard, the museum is open five days a week (Tuesday through Saturday) from April through September and at other times by appointment.

== Government ==
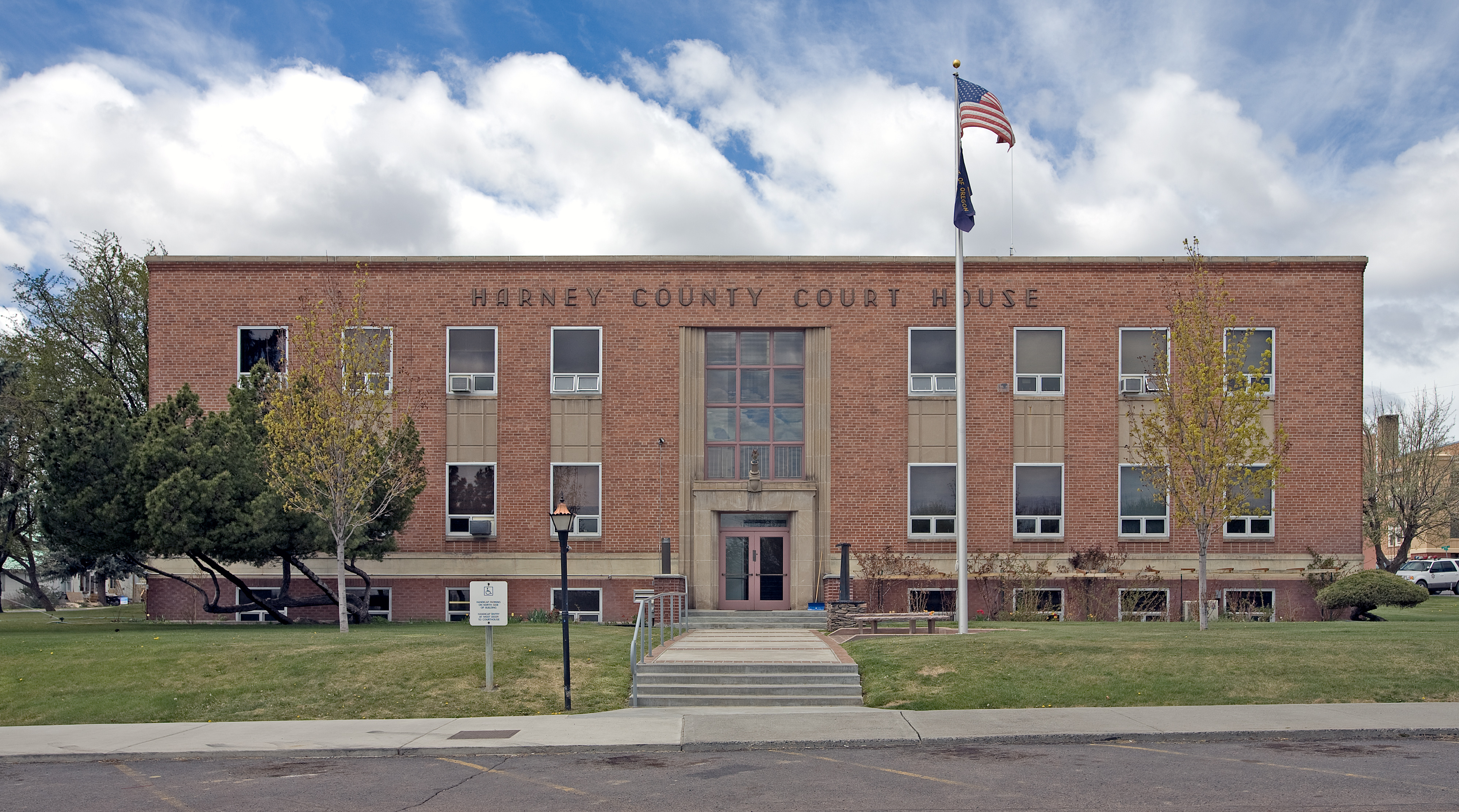
Harney County Courthouse

Burns has a mayor–council government. Jerry Woodfin, one of seven elected members of the council, is the mayor. The city's public works department, consisting of a director and four full-time workers, maintains the water lines, sewers, and streets of Burns. The police department includes a chief of police, an office assistant, and three full-time officers who work for Hines as well as Burns. City officers and employees include a city manager, city clerk, municipal judge doubling as the utilities clerk, and an office assistant.

A tribal council governs the Burns Paiute Tribe, immediately northwest of Burns. The tribe has its own police, court, and health and other services, including a tribal community center.

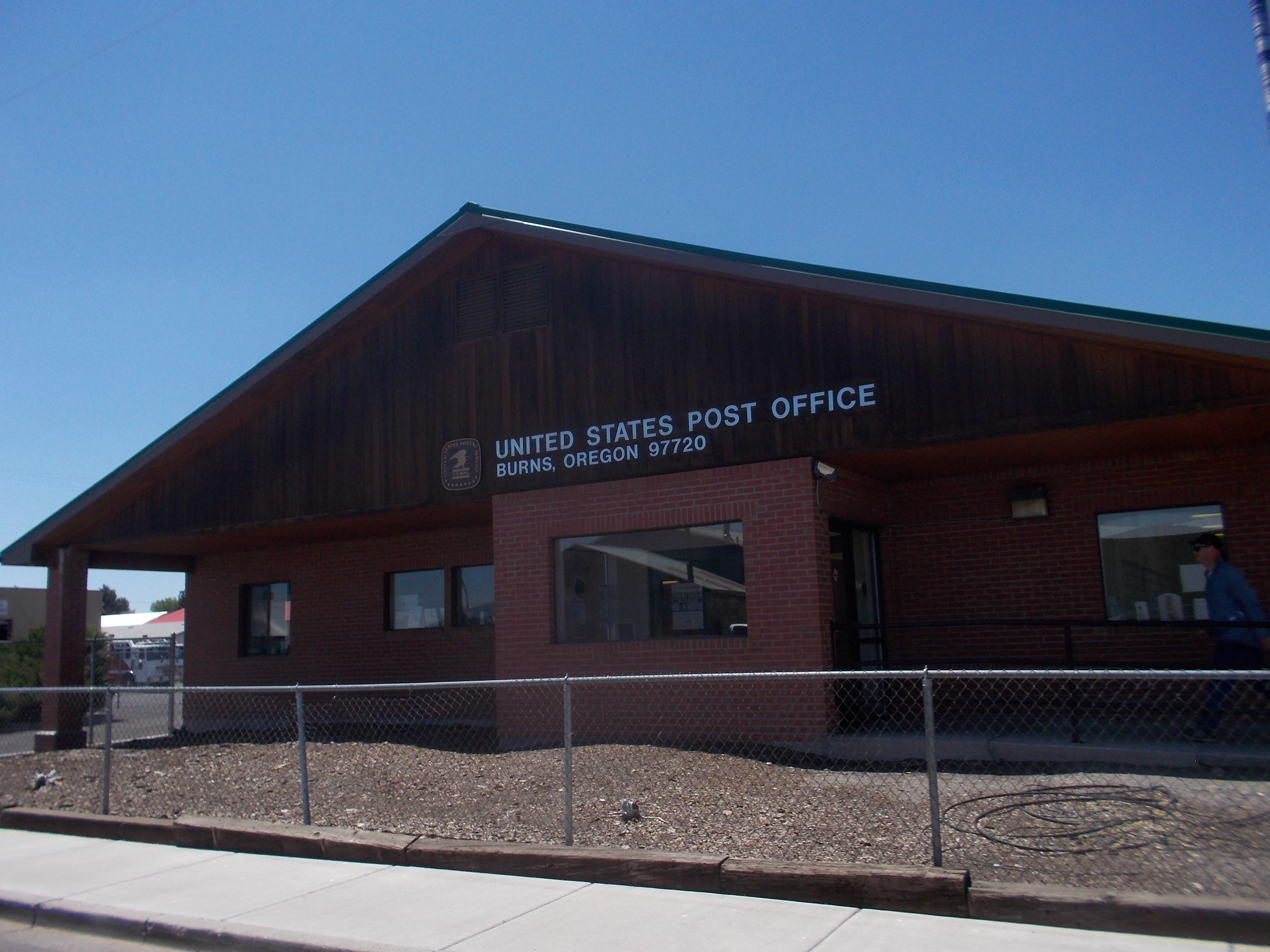
Burns Post Office

The Harney County Courthouse is in Burns. County officials include a judge and two commissioners, a clerk, treasurer, assessor, district attorney, justice of the peace, sheriff, and circuit court judge.

Cliff Bentz, a Republican, won election in 2020 to represent Burns as part of Oregon's 2nd congressional district in the United States House of Representatives. Ron Wyden and Jeff Merkley, both Democrats, serve the entire state of Oregon in the United States Senate. Republican Lynn Findley represents District 30, including Burns, in the Oregon Senate. Republican Mark Owens represents District 60, including Burns, in the Oregon House.

== Education ==
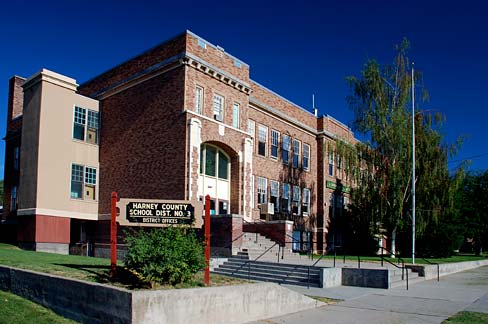
Former Harney County School District 3 headquarters

Harney County School District 3 provides public education in Burns and Hines, at Henry L. Slater Grade School in Burns, Hines Middle School, and Burns High School.

Burns previously had its own elementary school district, with a separate Burns-based high school district. A 1975 proposal to merge those districts, along with the elementary school district of Hines and two other school districts, was turned down by voters. In 1985, the Burns school district used the cafeteria at Slater Elementary to provide food service to all of the district's schools. In 1989, the Burns high school district and the Burns and Hines elementary school districts combined into Harney County School District 3.

There is a branch of Silvies River Charter School in Burns, the Burns Learning Center.

Harney County is not in a community college district but Burns, along with the county, has a "contract out of district" (COD) with Treasure Valley Community College. TVCC operates the Burns Outreach Center in Burns.

The Harney County Library is located in Burns. Formed in 1903 by the Ladies Afternoon Club, the Harney County Library has grown from an initial collection of 12 books to more than 30,000 items in 2013. Library offerings include public computers, wireless Internet, video conferencing equipment, meeting spaces, and public programs, as well as books, magazines, newspapers, audio books, videos, DVDs, and access to Interlibrary Loan. The current facility opened in 1966. Claire McGill Luce (died 1971) donated $2,000,000 of Time Publishing stock to the library, which it used to document local history. The Claire McGill Luce Western History Room is used for these materials.

== Media ==
The weekly Burns Times-Herald is the only newspaper in the city. In 2006, five members of the Times-Herald staff formed Survival Media LLC, which bought the newspaper from its former out-of-state owners. According to Survival Media, this was the first staff buyout of a newspaper in Oregon. Two commercial radio stations, KZHC-FM (92.7 FM) and KZHC (1230 AM), are licensed to broadcast from Burns.

== Infrastructure ==
=== Transportation ===
Burns Municipal Airport provides general aviation services. The airport, with 5,100 feet (1,600 m) of lighted runway, is 6 miles (10 km) east of the city. Pony Express provides air freight service.

Haney County Senior & Community Services Center operates the Dial-A-Ride, which provides a local bus route between Burns and Hines. Public Oregon Intercity Transit (POINT) is an intercity bus system that includes service between Bend and Ontario, Oregon. It departs from Burns once daily in each direction. The buses are wheelchair accessible, can seat up to 20 passengers, and can be used for package delivery as well as public transport.

=== Health care ===
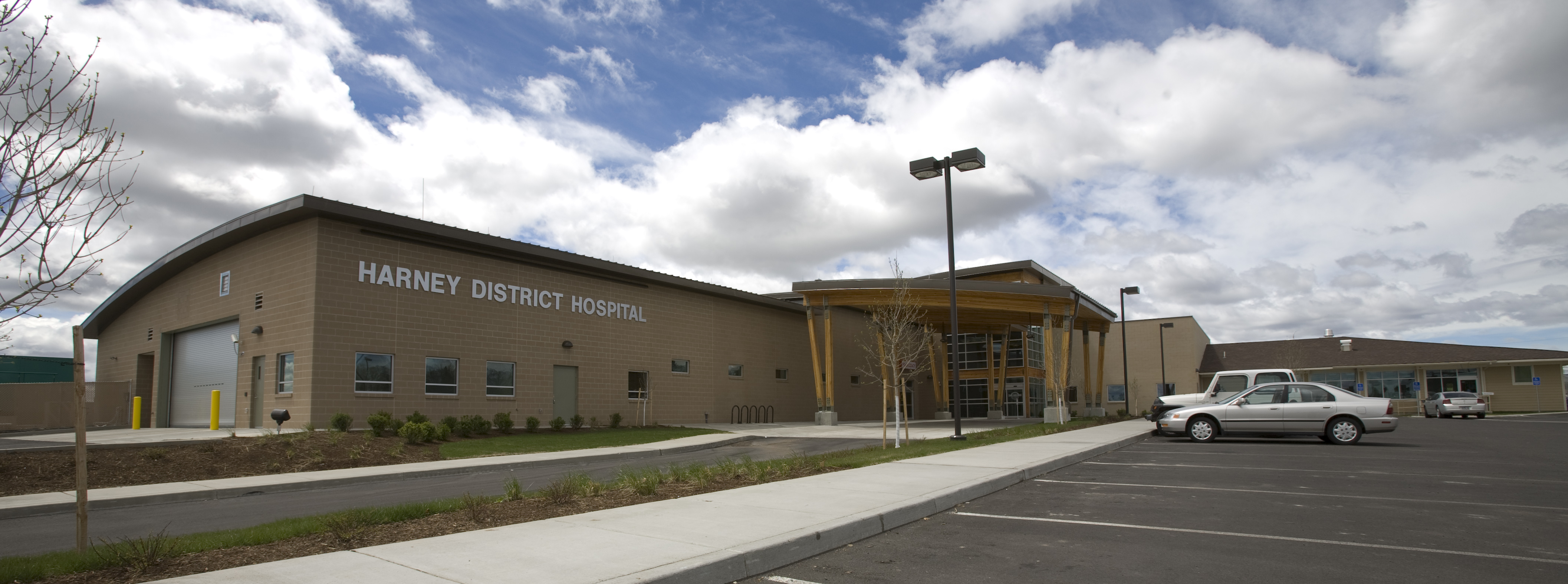
Harney District Hospital

Harney District Hospital in Burns is a general medical and surgical hospital with 20 patient beds. A public hospital, it is under a separate taxing district and has been since 1990, and previously was a part of the county government.

HDH Family Care and Mountain Sage Medical operate medical clinics in the city. The Burns–Hines VA Clinic in Burns provides general medical services to military veterans. Emergency medical services include AirLink Critical Care Transport and Life Flight Network via helicopter or airplane to the nearest appropriate treatment center.

In a period prior to 1989, the city had seven doctors. By the start of 1989, there was only one left to cover not only Burns but the entire county. At that time, Harney County residents realized that they needed to take steps to attract doctors to the area. There had also been a small number of nurses. By 1990 more nurses came to the area.

== Notable people ==
- Kellen Clemens – NFL quarterback
- Norma Paulus – former Oregon Secretary of State and former Oregon Superintendent of Public Instruction
- Susannah Scaroni, Paralympic athlete.
- Robert Smith – former member of the United States House of Representatives and former Speaker of the Oregon House of Representatives
- Gene Timms - former Oregon State Senator and business owner
