= Grant Union High School (John Day, Oregon) =

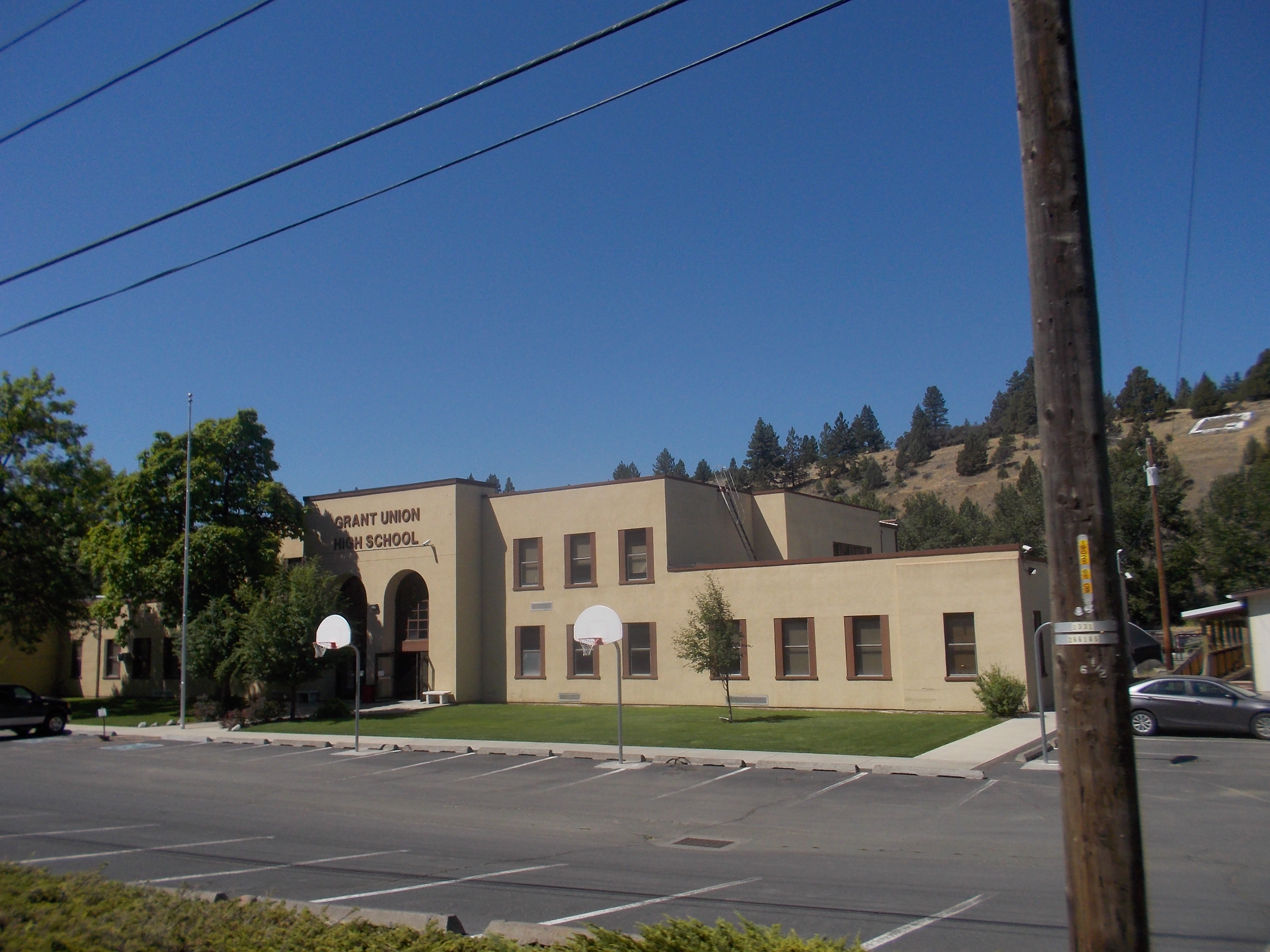

Location
- 911 S Canyon Boulevard; John Day, (Grant County), Oregon 97845; United States; 44.404573°N 118.947502°W

Information
- Type: Public
- School district: Grant County School District #3
- Principal: Ryan Gerry
- Teaching staff: 18.07 (FTE)
- Grades: 7-12
- Enrollment: 204 (2023-2024)
- Student to teacher ratio: 11.29
- Colors: Scarlet, black, and white
- Athletics conference: OSAA Wapiti League 2A-6
- Mascot: Prospector
- Website: guhs.grantschooldistrict.org

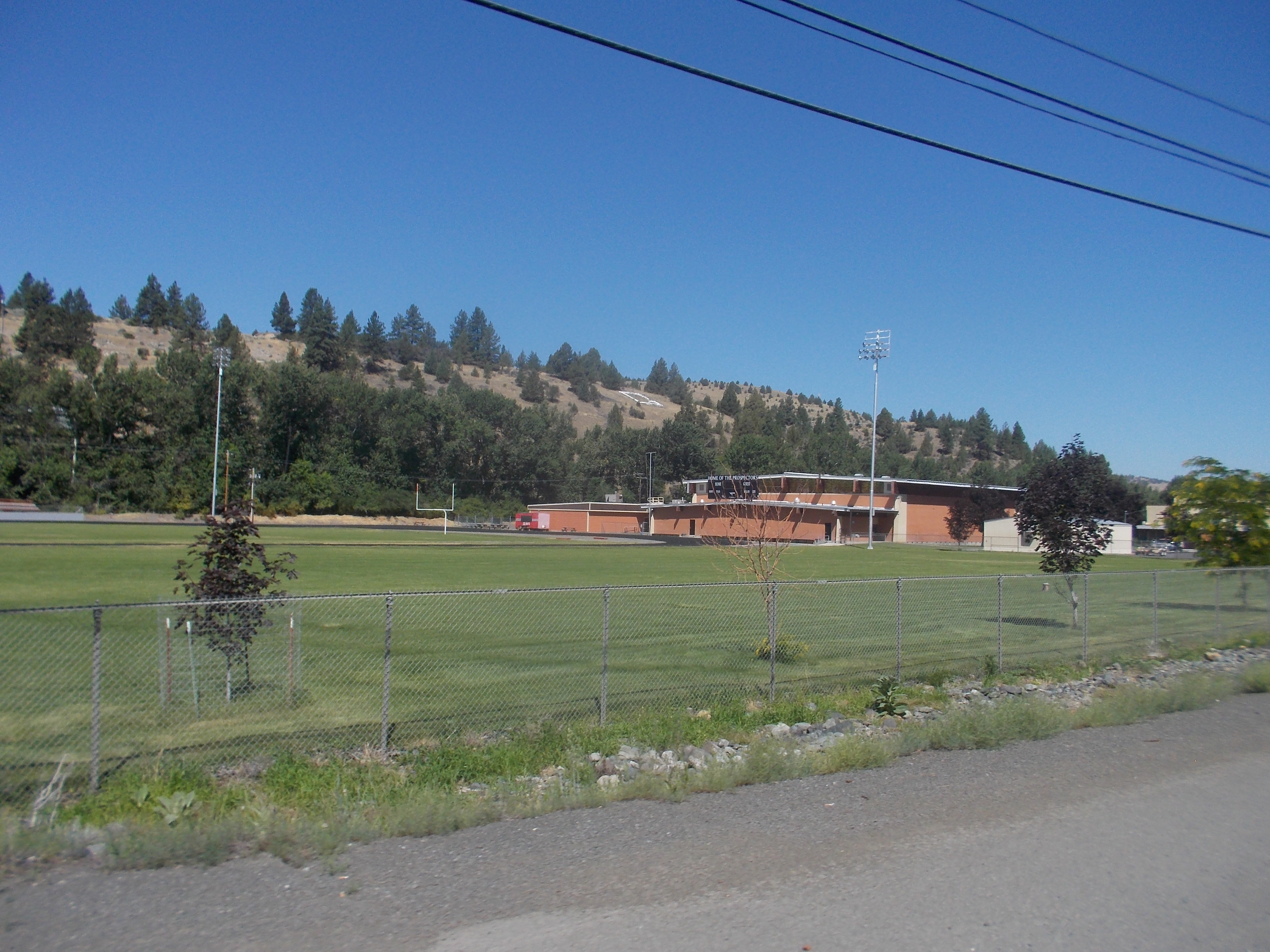
Athletic fields

Grant Union High School is a public high school in John Day, Oregon, United States.

== Academics ==
In 2008, 96% of the school's seniors received a high school diploma. Of 49 students, 47 graduated, none dropped out, and two received a modified diploma.

== Notable alumni ==
- Denny Smith, former Congressman
