= National Register of Historic Places listings in Harney County, Oregon =

Location of Harney County in Oregon

This list presents the full set of buildings, structures, objects, sites, or districts designated on the National Register of Historic Places in Harney County, Oregon, United States, and offers brief descriptive information about each of them. The National Register recognizes places of national, state, or local historic significance across the United States. Out of over 90,000 National Register sites nationwide, Oregon is home to over 2,000, and 7 of those are found in Harney County.

This National Park Service list is complete through NPS recent listings posted October 16, 2026.

== Current listings ==
	Name on the Register	Image	Date listed	Location	City or town	Description
1	Allison Ranger Station	Allison Ranger Station	September 12, 1980 (#80003314)	NW of Burns; 43°55′14″N 119°35′23″W	Burns vicinity	
2	Double-O Ranch Historic District	Double-O Ranch Historic District	October 25, 1982 (#82001502)	Double-O County Rd. 43°16′39″N 119°18′36″W	Burns	
3	Pete French Round Barn	Pete French Round Barn	September 10, 1971 (#71000679)	N of Diamond Station; 43°07′57″N 118°38′33″W	Burns vicinity	
4	Frenchglen Hotel	Frenchglen Hotel	November 15, 1984 (#84000469)	OR 205; 42°49′35″N 118°54′53″W	Frenchglen	
5	P Ranch	P Ranch	January 29, 1979 (#79002060)	S of Burns; 42°49′44″N 118°53′20″W	Burns	
6	Riddle Ranch	Riddle Ranch	May 23, 1991 (#91000614)	Little Blitzen R., E of Donner and Blitzen R. 42°39′58″N 118°44′50″W	Frenchglen	
7	Sod House Ranch	Sod House Ranch	January 29, 1979 (#79002061)	S of Burns; 43°15′21″N 118°52′13″W	Burns	

== See also ==
- National Register of Historic Places listings in Oregon
- Listings in neighboring counties: Crook, Deschutes, Grant, Humboldt, Lake, Malheur, Washoe
- Historic preservation
- History of Oregon
- Lists of Oregon-related topics
