= High Desert Discovery Scenic Byway =

High Desert Discovery Scenic Byway

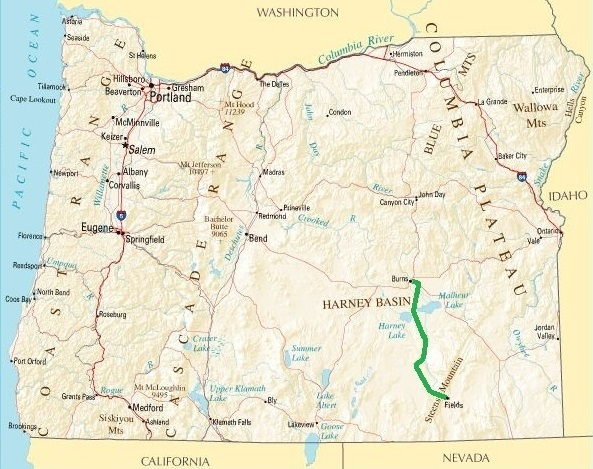
- Scenic byway highlighted in green

Route information
- Length: 127 mi (204 km)
- Existed: 2003–present
- Component highways: OR 78; OR 205

Major junctions
- North end: Burns
- South end: Fields

Location
- Country: United States
- State: Oregon
- Counties: Harney

Highway system
- Oregon Highways; Interstate; US; State; Named; Scenic

The High Desert Discovery Scenic Byway is a 127-mile-long (204 km) scenic highway in the southeastern part of the U.S. state of Oregon. It runs through the state's high desert country from the town of Burns to the unincorporated community of Fields. It was designated as an Oregon Scenic Byway in 2003. The highway is maintained by the Oregon Department of Transportation (ODOT). There are a number of points of interest along the route including several that are listed on the National Register of Historic Places.

== Route description ==
Starting from Burns, travel east on Oregon Route 78 for 1.5 miles (2.4 km). At the junction with Oregon Route 205, turn south onto the High Desert Discovery Scenic Byway. Travel 27 miles (43 km) south across the Harney Basin to reach the Narrows interpretive site near the bridge between Malheur and Harney lakes. Continue south on Route 205 through the Malheur National Wildlife Refuge. The refuge extends from just south of the Narrows to the small unincorporated community of Frenchglen, Oregon. The Diamond Loop Tour Route turnoff is 15 miles (24 km) north of Frenchglen. The main byway route continues south, arriving at Frenchglen, 60 miles (97 km) south of Burns.

The Steens Loop Tour Route begins at Frenchglen. In addition, the P Ranch Historic District is located approximately 1 mile (1.6 km) east of the community center. From Frenchglen, the Discovery byway heads west and then southwest over a low pass into the Catlow Valley, west of Steens Mountain. Shortly after entering the valley, there is a turnoff for the Hart Mountain National Antelope Refuge to the west. However, the Discovery byway continues to follow Route 205. It passes by the Roaring Springs Ranch, running parallel with Catlow Rim just east of the highway. After following the rim for approximately 30 miles (48 km), the byway turns southeast and begins to claim over Steens Mountain. On its last leg, the byway passes over Long Hollow Summit and descends into the Pueblo Valley. The High Desert Discovery Scenic Byway ends at the small unincorporated community of Fields. The entire scenic byway trip covers 127 miles (204 km).

=== Alternate tour routes ===
The Diamond Loop Tour Route and the Steens Loop Tour Route are side trips from the main byway. The Diamond Loop Tour Route begins 15 miles (24 km) north of Frenchglen, heading east from the main byway. It is a 69-mile (111 km) loop. The tour route offers the opportunity to see interesting geologic formations including the Diamond Craters volcanic area and the historic Pete French Round Barn. The Peter French barn is listed on the National Register of Historic Places. There is also a modern visitor center located at the barn site.

The Steens Loop Tour Route begins at Frenchglen. It is a 59-mile (95 km) loop that climbs to the top of Steens Mountain and then descends, re-connects with the main byway 16 miles (26 km) south of Frenchglen. From the East Rim Overlook, travelers can see the Alvord Desert 5,500 feet (1,700 m) below. The route passes Kiger Gorge Overlook, a viewpoint above a deep U-shaped glacier cut valley. The route passes several other viewpoints along the crest of Steen Mountain as well. The tour provides an opportunity to spot Bighorn sheep on the mountain’s rocky cliffs. The Steen Mountain loop road is closed during the winter months.

=== Points of interest ===
The goal of the Oregon state byway program is to preserve the state's most outstanding scenic highway corridors. It is also designed to provide interesting tourist opportunities for the traveling public. Oregon byways highlight the scenic, historic, recreational, and cultural features found along the routes. All of Oregon’s byways must met road standards that accommodate most travelers and are maintained by the Oregon Department of Transportation.

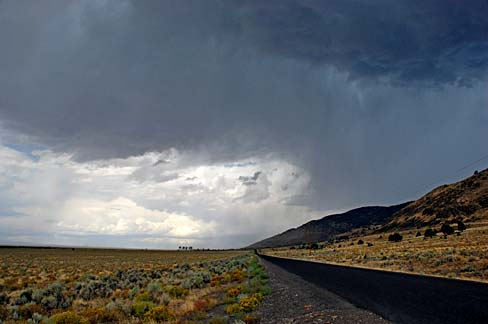
Discovery byway in the Catlow Valley

There are a number of interesting sights and places along the High Desert Discovery Scenic Byway route. These include:

- Harney Basin
- Wright Point
- Narrows interpretive site
- Buena Vista Station
- Malheur National Wildlife Refuge
- Diamond Loop Tour Route
- Frenchglen Hotel (listed on the National Register of Historic Places)
- P Ranch Historic District (listed on the National Register of Historic Places)
- Steen Mountain Tour Route
- Catlow Valley
- Roaring Springs Ranch
- Catlow Rim
- Long Hollow Summit Viewpoint

In addition to the fixed points of interest, the High Desert Discovery Scenic Byway provides the opportunity to spot high desert wildlife along the route. A number of large mammal species inhabit the area along the byway and can sometime be seen from the roadway. These include pronghorn, mule deer, elk, and wild horses. Hawks and Golden eagles can be seen along the byway route as well. Sandhill cranes, Canada geese, tundra swans, and many species of ducks and shorebirds are common along the Malheur refuge section of the byway.

=== Byway highlights ===
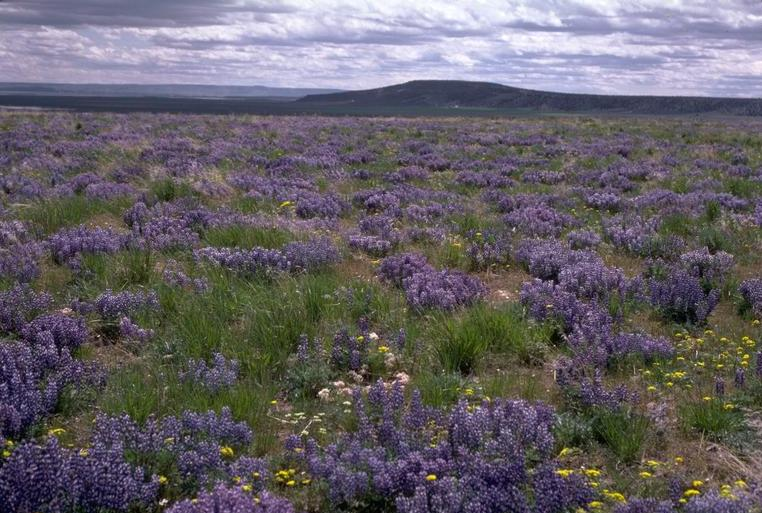
Wright's Point

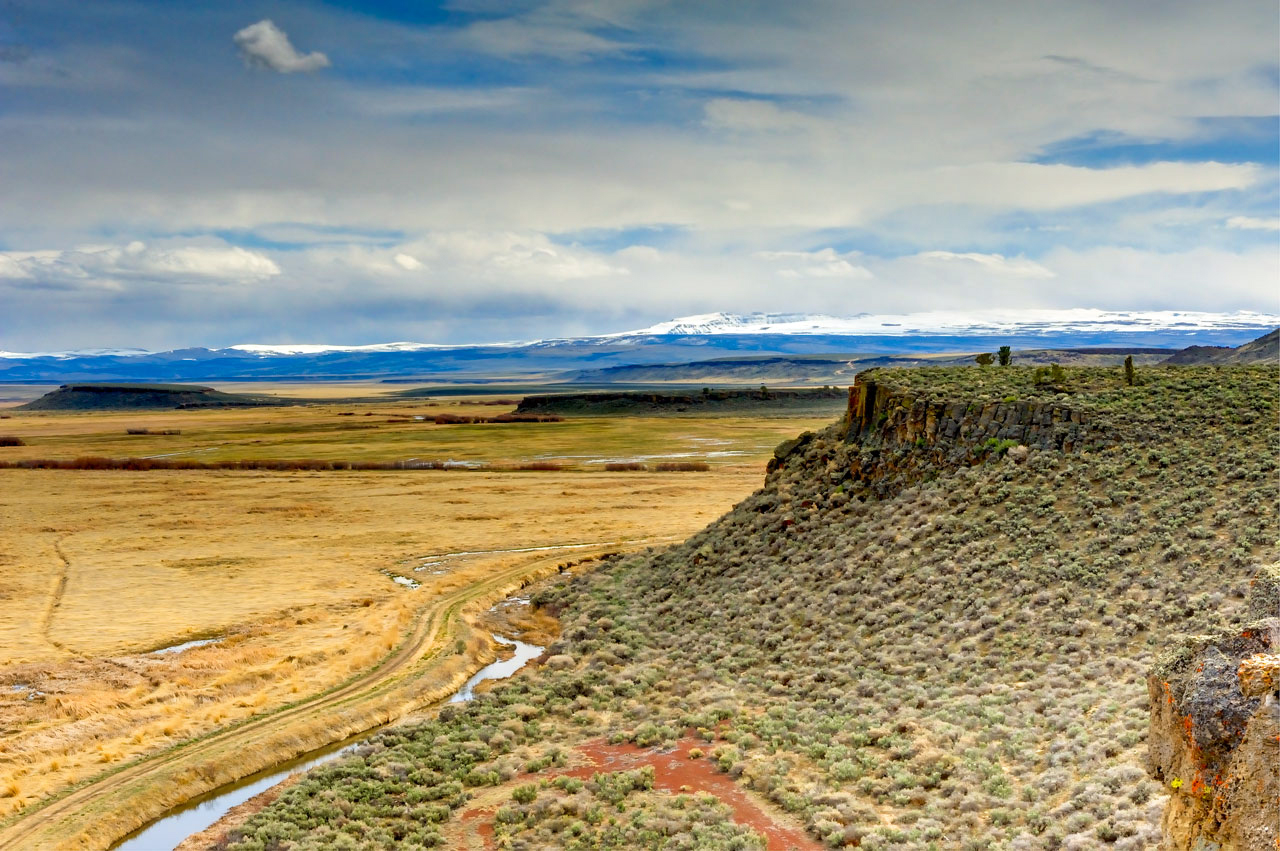
Buena Vista

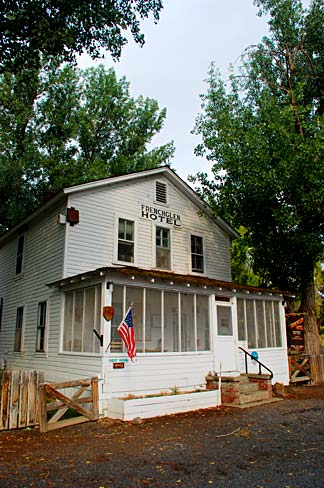
Frenchglen Hotel

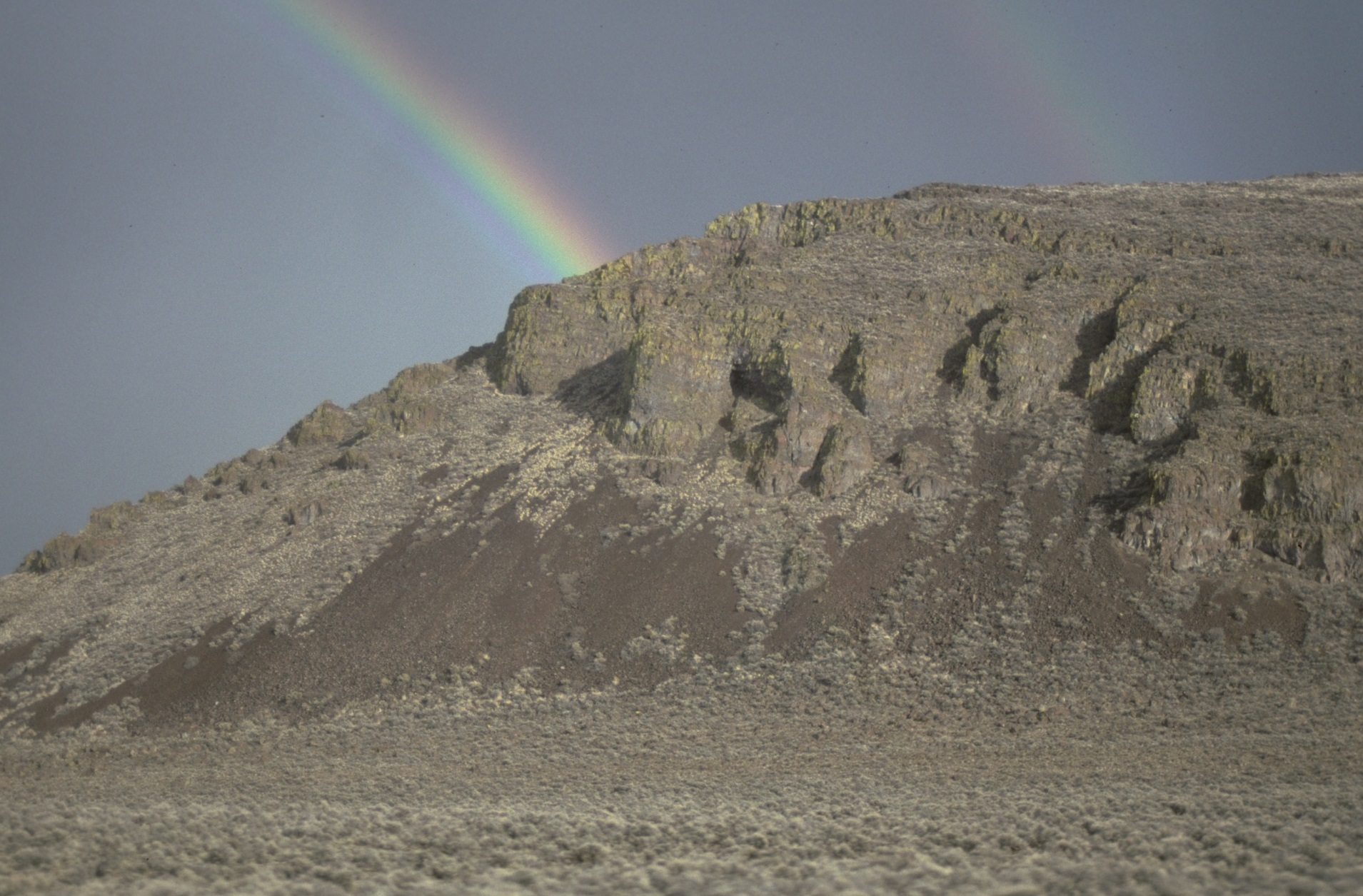
Catlow Rim

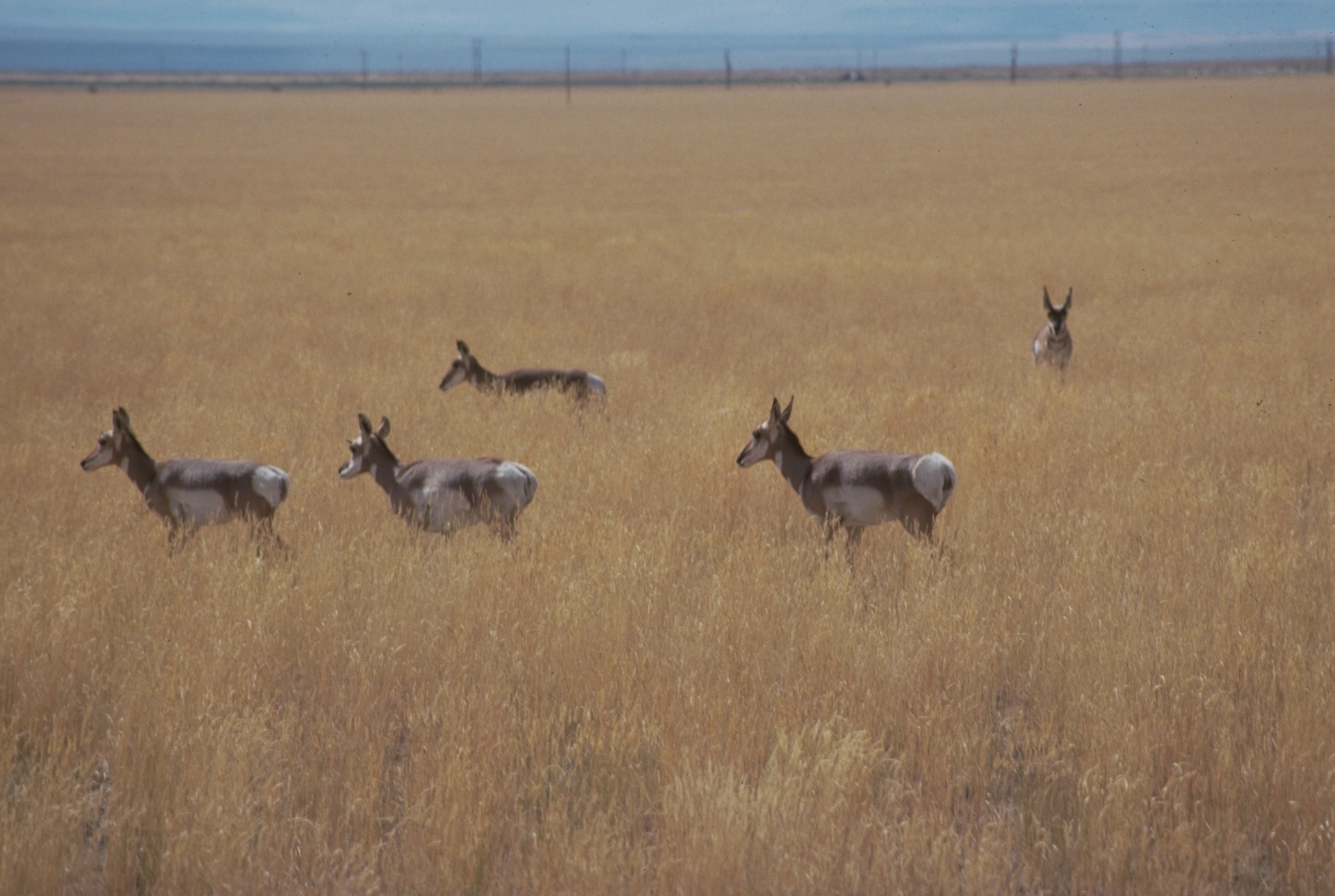
Catlow area pronghorn

== History ==
In 1991, the Intermodal Surface Transportation Efficiency Act established the National Scenic Byways Program. Congress put the Federal Highway Administration in charge of managing the program. The program is intends to promote economic development and tourism by protecting scenic highway routes, often in less-traveled areas of the country. To be designated as a scenic byway, the road must have unique natural, archaeological, cultural, historic, scenic, or recreational value.

In the early 1990s, the United States Fish and Wildlife Service and the Bureau of Land Management proposed a scenic byway between New Princeton and Lakeview. The proposed route ran through Malheur National Wildlife Refuge, Hart Mountain National Antelope Refuge, and Warner Wetlands. The plan included the construction of three visitor centers along the route plus 24 interpretive waysides. However, a national byway was never established.

In 2003, the state of Oregon designated a portion of Oregon Route 205 as the High Desert Discovery Scenic Byway. It was a shorter route than the one proposed by the United States Fish and Wildlife Service and the Bureau of Land Management, and did not include any visitor centers along the way. In addition to the main byway, the state also approved the Diamond Loop and Steens Loop scenic tour routes that year.

== Major intersections ==
The entire route is in Harney County.

Location	mi	km	Destinations	Notes
Burns	0	0.0	OR 78 east	Beginning of the byway
	1	1.6	OR 205 south	
	44	71	Diamond Lane	Junction with Diamond Loop Tour Route
Frenchglen	60	97	Steens Mountain Loop Road	Junction with Steens Loop Tour Route
	71	114	Steens Mountain Loop Road	Junction with Steens Loop Tour Route
Fields	127	204	OR 205	End of the byway
1.000 mi = 1.609 km; 1.000 km = 0.621 mi

== See also ==
- National Scenic Byway
