= Double-O Ranch Historic District =

Historic district in Oregon, United States

- U.S. National Register of Historic Places
- U.S. Historic district
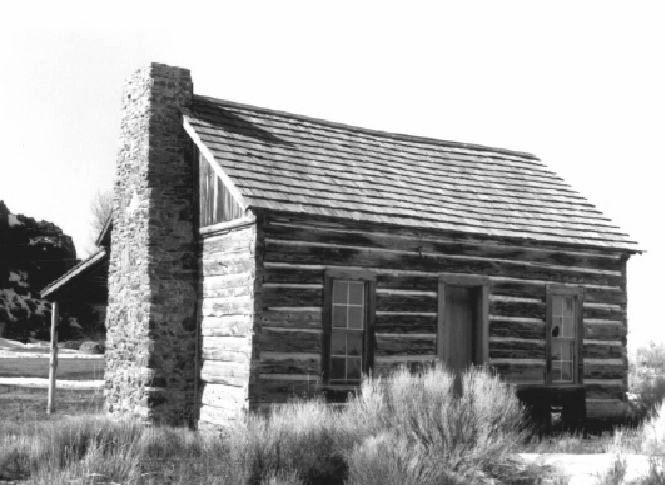
- Blacksmith's cabin at Double O Ranch site

- Location within Oregon Location within the United States
- Location: Malheur National Wildlife Refuge
- Nearest city: Burns, Oregon
- Coordinates: 43°16′39″N 119°18′36″W
- Area: 10 acres (4.0 ha)
- Built: 1880
- NRHP reference No.: 82001502
- Added to NRHP: October 25, 1982

The Double-O Ranch Historic District is located west of Harney Lake in Harney County in southeastern Oregon, United States. At one time, the Double-O Ranch covered over 17,000 acres (69 km^{2}). The ranch was owned by Bill Hanley, a well-known cattle baron and Bull Moose progressive. In 1941, the United States Government purchased most of the Double O Ranch property and added it to the Malheur National Wildlife Refuge. The two remaining Double-O Ranch buildings are now listed on the National Register of Historic Places.

== Early history ==
The Double-O Ranch is located in the Harney Basin of southeastern Oregon. Around 9,800 years ago, the Harney Basin was covered by a single great lake covering 255,000 acres (1,030 km^{2}). Early inhabitants received abundant food from the birds, animals, and plants found in the wetland around the lake. About 3,500 years ago, small villages began to develop around it. Due to extended droughts beginning about 1,400 years ago, the lake and surrounding wetlands began to shrink.

While there are no records of the earliest people to inhabit the Harney Basin, Native Americans used the wetland areas around Harney Lake for thousands of years before the arrival of European settlers. By the time Europeans began to explore the area in the early nineteenth century, the Northern Paiute people were well established in the Harney Basin.

Hudson's Bay Company fur trappers were the first Europeans to visit the Harney Basin. Peter Skene Ogden passed through the area in 1826. Other fur trapping expeditions followed in the 1830s. Several military expeditions explored the area in the late 1850s. Major Enoch Steen was the first non-native to explore the Donner und Blitzen River area south of Harney Lake in 1860. Steens Mountain, that dominates central Harney County, was named in his honor. In the 1860s, the United States Army established a number of military outposts in the Harney Basin.

The Double-O Ranch was established in 1875 by Amos W. Riley and James A. Hardin. It was one of the first permanent pioneer settlements in Harney County. In June 1878, during the Bannock War, the original ranch buildings were burned by a Bannock and Paiute war party. On 23 October 1878, the only pitched battle of that war occurred near Silver Creek on the northern edge of the Double-O Ranch.

After the Bannock War, Riley and Hardin rebuilt the Double-O Ranch. They continued to operate the ranch until 1903, when it was sold to William "Bill" Hanley who owned land north of the Double-O Ranch. Hanley improved the Double-O property, significantly increased cattle production. He also made the ranch a rustic retreat for his many guests.

== Bill Hanley ==
William "Bill" Hanley moved to Harney County in eastern Oregon in 1879. Hanley initially purchased land near Burns, Oregon. In 1903, he acquired the Double-O Ranch near Harney Lake for $6 an acre. Over time, Hanley turned it into one of the county's largest cattle ranches, and a showplace for his personal guests who wanted to enjoy the privacy and open space of southeastern Oregon.

The Double-O was one of five ranches operated by Hanley. His ranch holdings totaled over 25,000 acres (100 km^{2}) of deeded property. His Bell-A Ranch was three miles east of Burns. It only covered 6,700 acres (27 km^{2}), but it was widely regarded as one of the finest ranch estates in the western United States. His Double-O Ranch was over 17,000 acres (69 km^{2}). At the Double-O Ranch, it was 8 miles (13 km) from the ranch gate to the front door of the main house. Hanley also had access to thousands of acres of public range land. In 1913, The New York Times reported that Hanley's cattle operation covered 200,000 acres (810 km^{2}). He eventually established the Harney Valley Improvement Company to promote his land interests and encourage the development of Harney County.

During the time he was building his ranch empire, Hanley knew the other powerful eastern Oregon cattle barons well. His peers included Peter French, who owned of the vast P Ranch; John Devine, founder of the White Horse Ranch; and Henry Miller, head of the Miller and Lux Company that controlled over 1,000,000 acres (4,000 km^{2}) of land in California, Oregon, and Nevada.

Hanley was a progressive thinker, who became famous for his ranch hospitality. He entertained guests at his Bell-A Ranch or took them to the rustic Double-O Ranch to enjoy the outdoors. His friends included prominent politicians like Theodore Roosevelt, William Howard Taft, and William Jennings Bryan as well as business tycoons such as James J. Hill, owner of the Great Northern Railway. Hanley also played host to well-known writer CES Wood, poet Edwin Markham, painter Childe Hassam, sculptor Alexander Phimister Proctor, and humorist Will Rogers. In 1914, he ran unsuccessfully for the United States Senate as a progressive Bull Moose Party candidate.

== Malheur National Wildlife Refuge ==
The Malheur Migratory Bird Refuge was created in 1908. Over the years, the refuge grew to encompass 81,786 acres (330.98 km^{2}) around Malheur Lake. During the 1930s, the P Ranch near Frenchglen, Oregon and Sod House Ranch south of Malheur Lake were incorporated into the refuge, adding 64,717 acres (261.90 km^{2}) to the protected wildlife area. In 1940, the name of the refuge was officially changed to the Malheur National Wildlife Refuge.

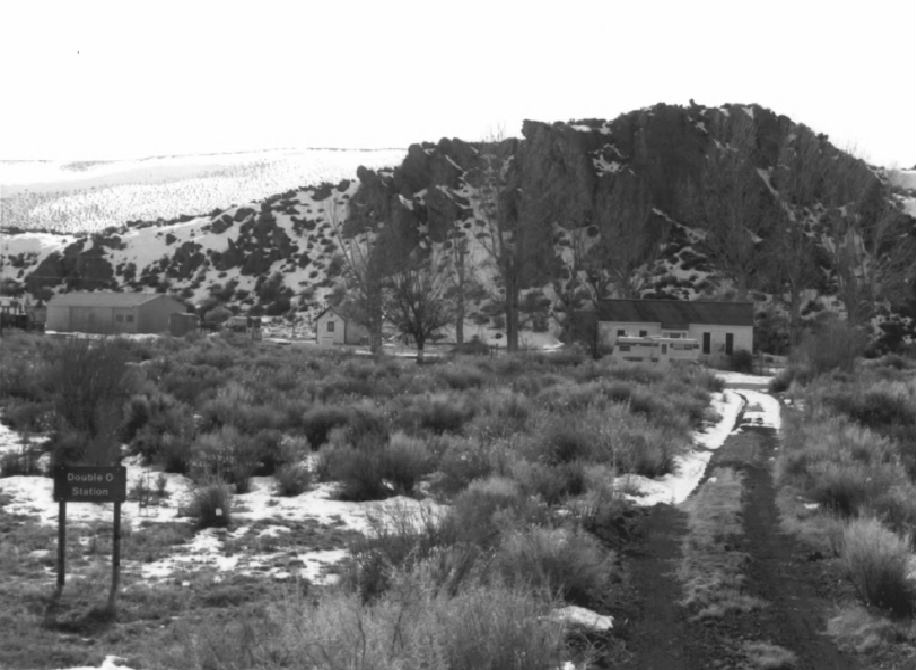
Double O Station on the Malheur wildlife refuge

In 1941, the United States Government purchased 14,751 acres (59.70 km^{2}) of Double-O Ranch land from the Hanley family for $118,000, adding it to the adjacent Malheur wildlife refuge to preserve shorebird habitat and protect critical waterfowl nesting areas. The Double-O Ranch included the lower Silver Creek drainage and several lakes that provided water to irrigate the property. The ranch's riparian areas, lake shore wetlands, and grassy meadows provided habitat for migratory birds traveling along the Pacific Flyway. A number of natural warm springs made the lakes a winter haven for non-migratory birds as well. Numerous birds including wild swans, Canada geese, great white egrets, herons, pelicans, and many duck species nested on the Double-O Ranch.

Because the ranch played an important role in the development of the cattle industry in the western United States, the Double-O Ranch was listed on the National Register of Historic Places as a historic district on 25 October 1982. The district covers 10 acres (0.040 km^{2}); however, there are only two of the original ranch buildings remaining at the site. Both of these historic structures are located on the compound of Double O Station, a year around field station operated by the United States Fish and Wildlife Service.

== Structures ==
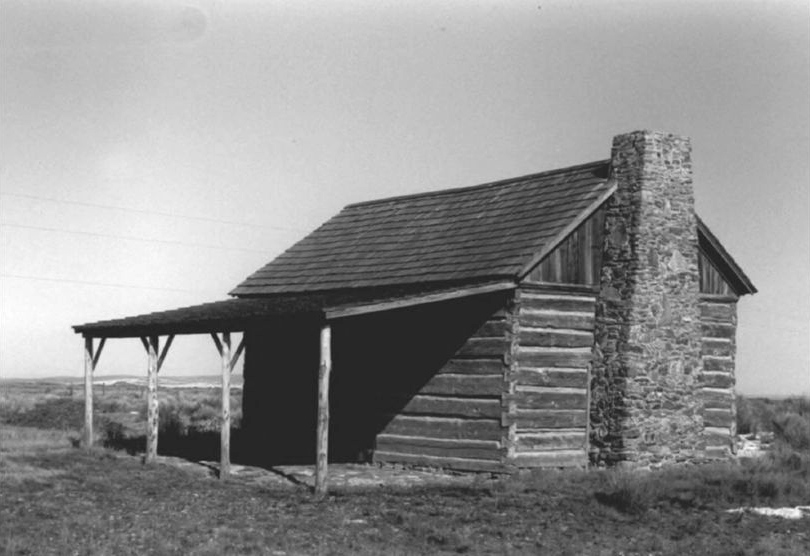
Cabin built for ranch blacksmith in the 1880s

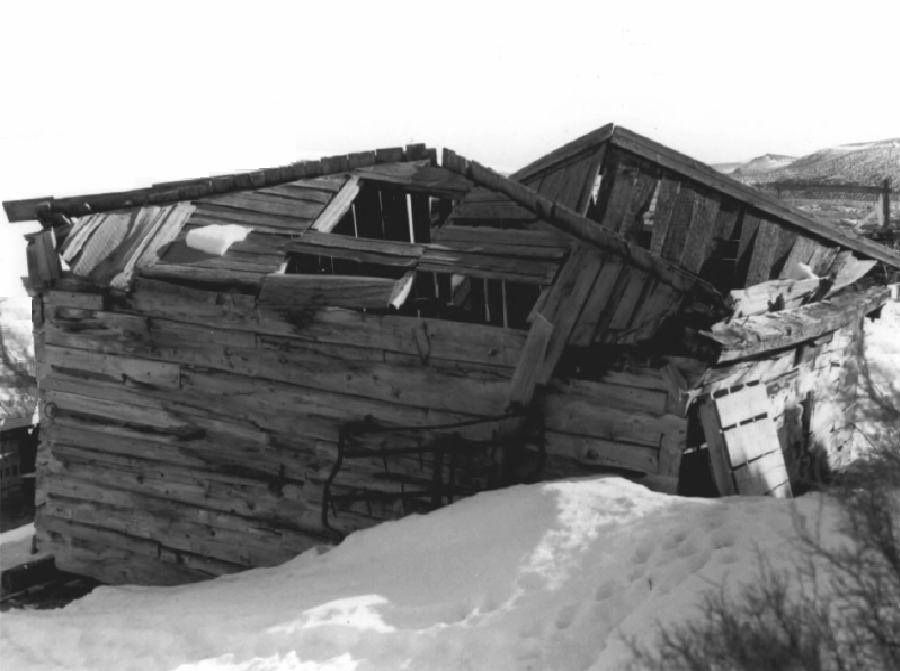
Ranch blacksmith shop photographed in 1982

After the original Double-O Ranch buildings were burned by Indians in 1878, the ranch was rebuilt by Riley and Hardin. Between 1879 and 1903, a number of buildings were constructed at the site; however, only two of those buildings remain. There are no buildings remaining from the Hanley era. The United States Fish and Wildlife Service added three non-historic building in the 1950s to support refuge operation.

The two remaining historic structures include a log cabin and a blacksmith's shop, both dating from the 1880s. In 1982, when the historic district was created, the cabin was in good condition, but the blacksmith's shop was partially collapsed.

The log cabin was used as the blacksmith's residence. It is a 1 1/2-story, hand-hewn log structure. All of the logs have been squared and have dovetailed ends that lock the log joints together. The cabin's footprint is 16 feet (4.9 m) by 24 feet (7.3 m). The cabin has a wooden floor and a cedar shingle roof. There is a porch on the south side of the building that shelters the main door. On the north side there is a second door and two windows. The structure was restored in 1979. The restoration project replaced the doors, windows, and roof. The porch and fireplace were also repaired, and a concealed concrete foundation was placed under the structure.

The blacksmith's shop is a single-story log structure with no foundation. The building is approximately 15 feet (4.6 m) by 19 feet (5.8 m). The only door is on the north side. It has two windows, one on the east end and the other on the west end. A board floor was added in 1903.

There are three other modern structures within the historic district. They include a residence used to house a refuge employee who lives at the site year around. The residence was moved from Camp Abbot to its present location in 1954. A large garage was built in 1955, and a pump house was added sometime in the 1950s. None of these structures have historic significance.

== Location ==
The Double-O Ranch Historic District is located within the boundaries of the Malheur National Wildlife Refuge in southeastern Oregon. The site is now known as Double O Station. The site is approximately 5 miles (8.0 km) east of Harney Lake. The elevation of Double O Station is 4,134 feet (1,260 m) above sea level.

The Double-O Ranch is 25 miles (40 km) southwest of Burns, Oregon in direct line. From Burns, travel east on Oregon Route 78 for 2 miles (3.2 km); then turn south on Oregon Route 205. Follow Route 205 for 20 miles (32 km) before turning west on the Double-O Road. The Double-O Ranch Historic District is located at Double-O Station approximately 18 miles (29 km) from the junction with Route 205.

== Education ==
The zoned K-8 school is Double O Elementary School. It is a one room school made of cement. In 1969 the school had six students. In 1998 the school had one teacher and a house for that teacher. At that time the enrollment was six. Like other rural schools in Harney County, the school receives traveling teachers from Harney County's agency for specialized subjects. Prior to 1998 there were periods where the telephone lines stopped working for over a month per instance. By 1998 the school was connected to the internet via a fiber optic line after the students asked Governor of Oregon John Kitzhaber for help. Circa 2005, enrollment at the Double O School has often been between three and five students, and the school had a cash reserve that allowed it to continue to operate. The consistency in enrollment resulted in consistency in funding from the Oregon government. In March 2005 it had three students.

High school students are zoned to Crane Union High School, of Harney County Union High School District 1J.

A 1975 proposal to merge the Double O and Suntex districts along with the elementary school districts of Burns and Hines, as well as the Burns high school district, was turned down by voters. The Burns and Hines elementary districts and the Burns high school district ultimately combined into Harney County School District 3 in 1989.

Harney County is not in a community college district but has a "contract out of district" (COD) with Treasure Valley Community College. TVCC operates the Burns Outreach Center in Burns.
