= Sod House Ranch =

- U.S. National Register of Historic Places
- U.S. Historic district
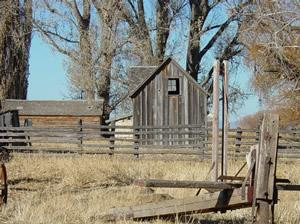
- Original buckaroo bunkhouse

- Location within Oregon Location within the United States
- Location: Malheur National Wildlife Refuge
- Nearest city: Burns, Oregon, USA
- Coordinates: 43.25515°N 118.87159°W
- Built: ca. 1880s to 1900
- Architectural style: Simple vernacular
- NRHP reference No.: 79002061
- Added to NRHP: 1979

The Sod House Ranch is a historic ranch in Harney County in southeastern Oregon, United States. The remaining ranch structures are located south of Malheur Lake in the Malheur National Wildlife Refuge. The ranch was built by Peter French, a well known 19th-century cattle baron. The Sod House Ranch became the headquarters for the northern operating division of the French-Glenn Livestock Company, which eventually covered over 140,000 acres (570 km^{2}). After French was murdered in 1897, the French-Glenn Livestock Company slowly sold off its ranch property. In 1935, the United States Government purchased the Sod House Ranch property to add to an adjacent wildlife refuge. The eight remaining Sod House Ranch buildings are now listed on the National Register of Historic Places.

== Early history ==
The Sod House Ranch is located in the Harney Basin of southeastern Oregon. Around 9,800 years ago, the Harney Basin was covered by a great lake covering 255,000 acres (1,030 km^{2}). The birds, animals, and plants found in the wetland around the lake provided abundant food for early inhabitants. About 3,500 years ago, small villages began to develop around the lakes and along the banks of the river. Beginning about 1,400 years ago, extended droughts began to shrink the lake and surrounding wetlands.

While there are no records of the earliest people to inhabit the Harney Basin, Native Americans used the wetland areas around Malheur Lake, Harney Lake, and Donner und Blitzen River for thousands of years before the arrival of European settlers. By the time Europeans began to explore the area in the early nineteenth century, the Northern Paiute people were well established in the Harney Basin.

Hudson's Bay Company fur trappers were the first Europeans to visit the Harney Basin. Peter Skene Ogden passed along the north shore of Malheur Lake in 1826. Other fur trapping expeditions followed in the 1830s. Several military expeditions passed through the area in the late 1850s. Major Enoch Steen was the first non-native to explore the Donner und Blitzen River area in 1860. Steens Mountain, which dominates southern Harney County, was named in his honor. In the 1860s, the United States Army established a number of military outposts in the Harney Basin.

== Peter French ==
Peter French was born in Missouri in 1849. His family immigrated to California in 1850. As a young man, French worked for Doctor Hugh J. Glenn, who owned large tracts of land in the Sacramento Valley. In 1872, Glenn decided to expand his operation into Oregon. Glenn picked 23-year-old Peter French to lead the venture. French was sent north with six vaqueros and 1,200 head of cattle.

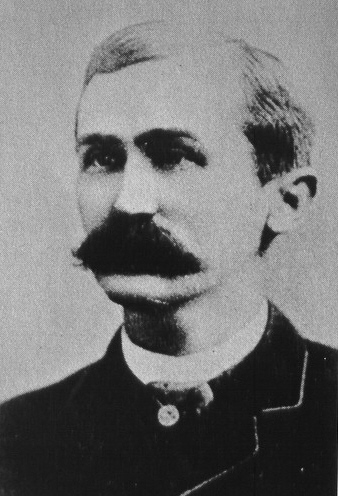
Peter French bought the ranch in 1877.

In the Blitzen Valley, French met a prospector named Porter, who had not found much gold and was eager to move on. French bought Porter's small herd of cattle along with his "P" cattle brand and rights to the west slope of Steens Mountain where Porter had prospected. French settled along the Donner und Blitzen River, over the next several years draining and fencing thousands of acres of wetlands along the river. That land became the P Ranch, named for Porter's "P" brand. French acquired the 43,000 acres (170 km^{2}) Sod House Ranch from A. H. Robie in 1877 along with Robie's property in the Diamond and Blitzen valleys. By the 1880s, the ranch was earning a good income for Glenn. Cattle were raised in the lush valley pastures. In the fall, French drove his cattle 200 miles (300 km) to the railhead at Winnemucca, Nevada.

In 1883, French married Glenn's daughter Ella. Glenn was murdered three weeks later by a former employee. French continued to manage the Oregon operation for the Glenn family, selling more cattle to help pay the family's debts. In 1894, Glenn's heirs decided to incorporate the French-Glenn partnership into the French-Glenn Livestock Company, making French the company president.

Over the years, French expanded the company's holdings until the ranch extended from the foothills of Steens Mountain 40 miles (64 km) along both sides of the Donner und Blitzen River to Malheur Lake, including the Sod House Ranch property running along the south shore of the lake. It also covered all of neighboring Happy and Diamond valleys plus a large part of the Catlow Valley to the south. Eventually, the French-Glenn Livestock Company owned over 140,000 acres (570 km^{2}) of the Harney Basin. Some records indicate the ranch may have covered as much as 200,000 acres (810 km^{2}). The company built 500 miles (800 km) of barbed wire fence to protect 30,000 to 45,000 head of cattle plus 3,000 horses and mules. In addition to the main P Ranch headquarters, the operation had four other divisions; the Happy Valley Division, the Diamond Division, the Catlow Valley Division, and Sod House Division. The Sod House Ranch served as French's sub-headquarters at the northern end the property near the mouth of the Donner und Blitzen River and along the south shore of Malheur Lake.

French was not popular with new homesteaders in the area because he owned or controlled most of the water in the southern Harney Basin. His fences also made it difficult for some homesteaders to access their property. On December 26, 1897, French was shot dead near the Sod House Ranch by a settler who had been unsuccessful in getting a road easement across French's property.

F. C. Lusk, secretary of the French-Glenn Livestock Company prior to French's death, became executor of French's estate and took over as ranch manager. Lusk gradually sold off ranch assets to pay off company debts. In 1906, much of the French-Glenn property including the Sod House Ranch was sold to Henry L. Corbett and his partner C.E.S. Wood. In 1916, the property was acquired by the Eastern Oregon Live Stock Company. In the 1920s, the part of the property known as the Barton Lake Ranch was bought by John Jenkins. This property includes the well-known Pete French Round Barn. In 1935, the United States Government bought the remaining property to expand the Malheur National Wildlife Refuge.

== Malheur National Wildlife Refuge ==
The Malheur Migratory Bird Refuge was created in 1908. Over the years, the refuge grew to encompass 81,786 acres (330.98 km^{2}) around Malheur Lake. In 1935, the United States Government purchased 64,717 acres (261.90 km^{2}) from the Eastern Oregon Live Stock Company for $675,000, adding the land to the refuge. The refuge was later renamed the Malheur National Wildlife Refuge.

During the 1930s, the refuge hosted three Civilian Conservation Corps camps, located at the Sod-House Ranch south of Malheur Lake, at Buena Vista Station, and at 5 miles (8.0 km) north of Frenchglen in the P Ranch area. CCC crews built a number of stone buildings to house the refuge headquarters near the Sod House site, and several refuge buildings at Buena Vista, four lookout towers, the main refuge patrol road, four concrete dams, numerous canals and bridges, and hundreds of miles of fence. The camps were closed in 1942.

Because it played an important role in the development of the cattle industry in the western United States, the Sod House Ranch was listed on the National Register of Historic Places as an historic district on January 29, 1979. The district covers 10 acres (0.040 km^{2}). Today, eight of the ten original ranch buildings plus three other historic structures remain at the site. Most of the historic buildings are in good condition.

== Structures ==
Originally the Sod House Ranch complex included ten buildings. The ranch buildings were constructed between the early 1880s and 1900. Today, eight of those building and several other historic structures remain at the ranch site. They are the main house, a buckaroo bunkhouse, a large barn, a workshop, a carriage shed, adjoining chicken coop and grain storage shed, a stone cellar, a small cabin, a beef wheel, and several original stockade fences. The ranch site is surrounded by a number of large cottonwood trees planted in 1892 by Emanuel Clark, French's Sod House Ranch foreman.

The Sod House Ranch buildings were constructed using native materials including pine and aspen lumber, juniper posts, and locally quarried stone. Most of the buildings have been repaired, reroofed, or restored in some way, but all of the structures still retained their original character.

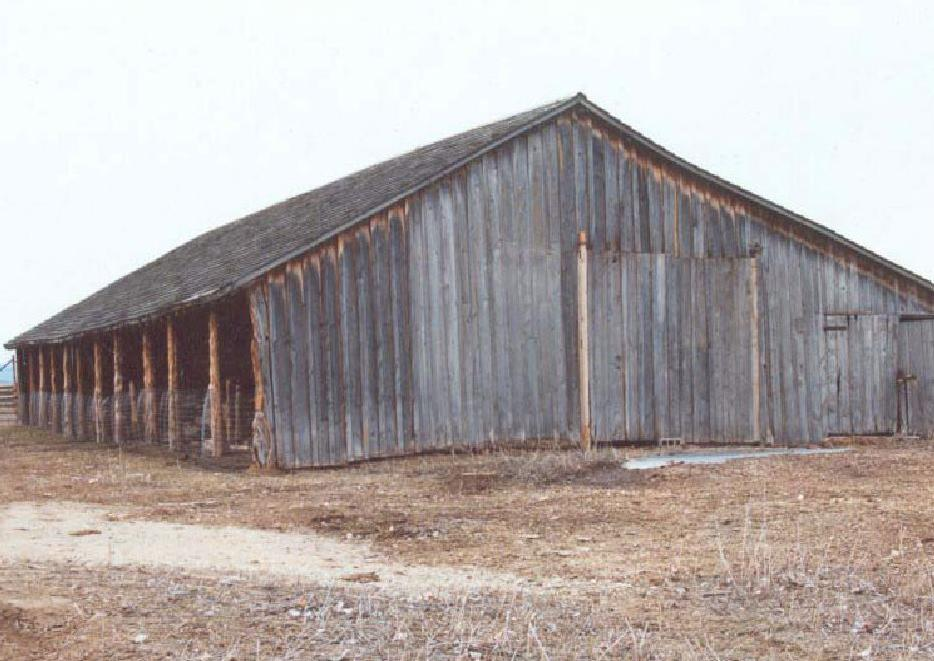
Restored 1880s barn at the Sod House Ranch

The barn was probably the first building constructed, probably in the early 1880s. It is 120 feet (37 m) long and 50 feet (15 m) wide. It is a post and beam structure with heavy juniper posts supporting the roof, which is 30 feet (9.1 m) high at its peak. The exterior of the barn is finished with pine and juniper boards. The roof is covered with pine shingles. The original roof was replaced in the 1930s by the Civilian Conservation Corps using pine shingles. The interior of the barn is a single large room with a wide center aisle to accommodate a winter hay supply. Feed racks run the length of the barn on both sides.

In 1999, the United States Fish and Wildlife Service undertook a project to stabilize and restore the barn. House jacks were used to lift the barn clear of the ground while failing interior support posts were removed and replaced by new juniper posts. Concrete piers were placed beneath the interior posts. The project also lifted parts of the structure 23 inches (58 cm) into vertical alignment.

At the same time, a number of partners joined the US Fish and Wildlife Service to restore other ranch buildings. This conservation work took five years. The Sod House Ranch was reopened to the public on October 18, 2003. Among the partners that helped to restore the ranch were the National Park Service, University of Oregon Architectural Field School, the Oregon Parks and Recreation Department, the Oregon State Historic Preservation Office, AmeriCorps, the National Fish and Wildlife Foundation, the Harney County Historical Society, Malheur Wildlife Associates, the High Desert Museum, and numerous local volunteer groups. Today, the Sod House Ranch is open to the public from August 15 through October 15. It is closed the rest of the year because the area provides important nesting habitat for colonies of great blue herons, double-crested cormorants, and Canada geese. Several structures within Sod House Ranch were the focus of historic preservation projects conducted by the University of Oregon’s Pacific Northwest Preservation Field School in 2012, in partnership with BLM, Oregon Parks and Recreation Department (OPRD), and U.S. Fish & Wildlife Service (FWS); this work included detailed measures to assess, stabilize, and repair historic features of the site. FWS oversaw substantial preservation repairs to the Stone Cellar structure in 2021-2022 seasons, following its partial collapse in the winter of 2019-2020.

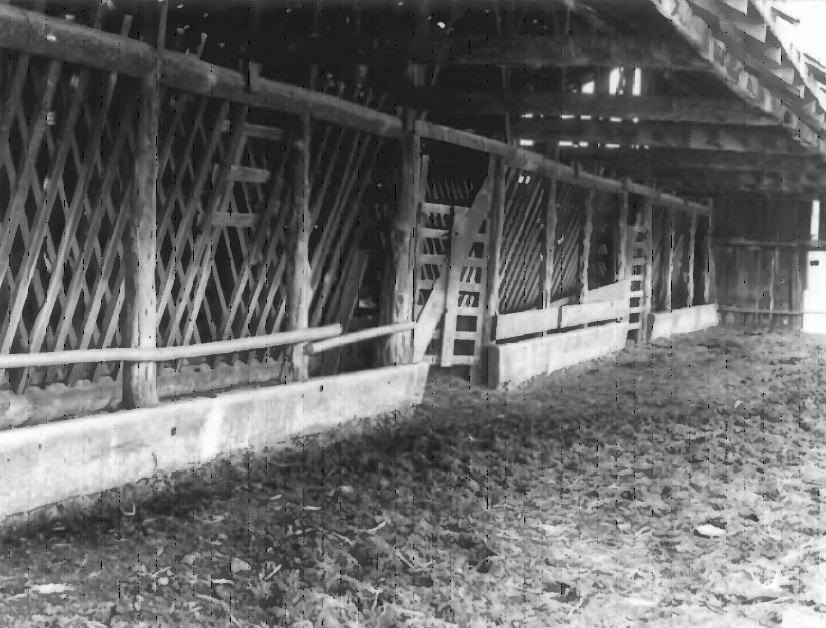
Barn feed racks

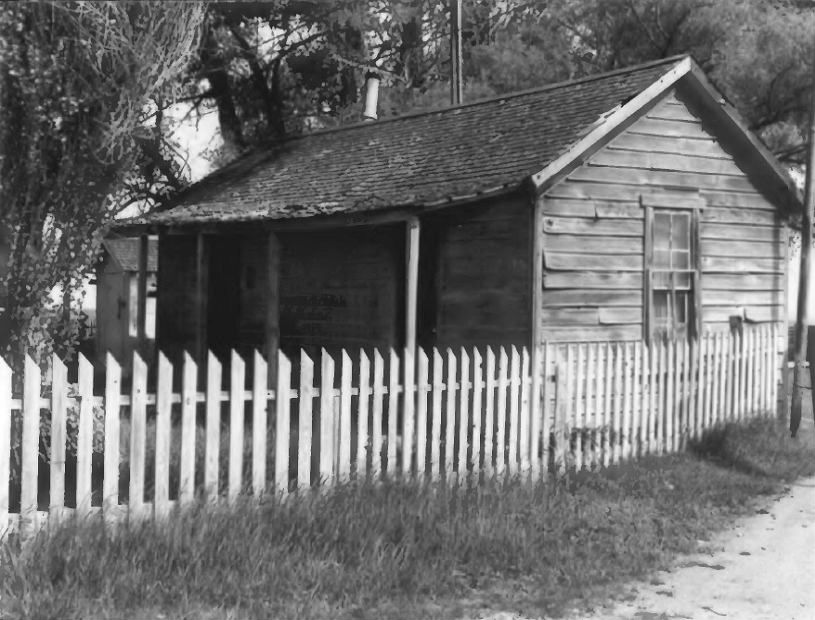
Ranch cabin

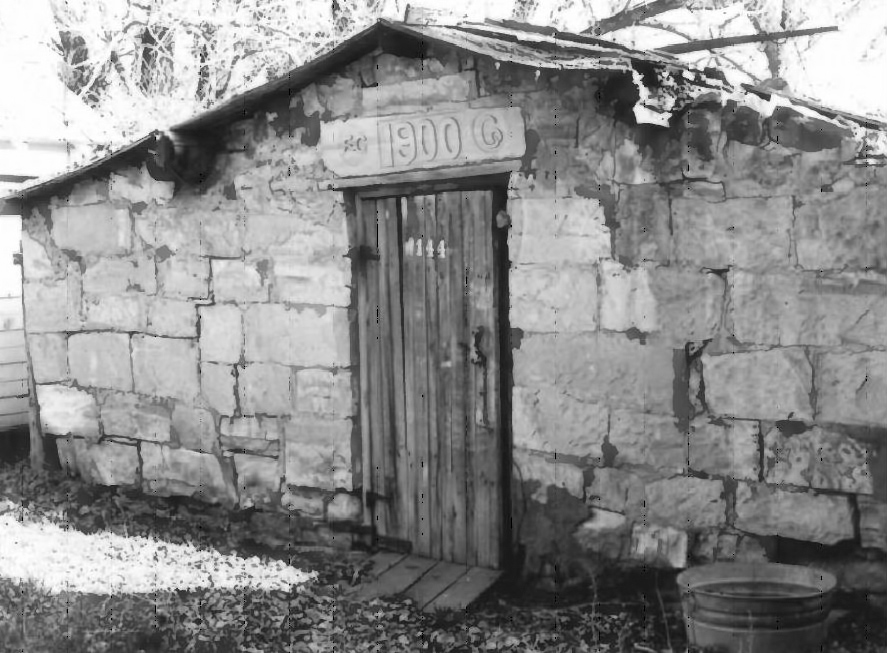
Stone cellar

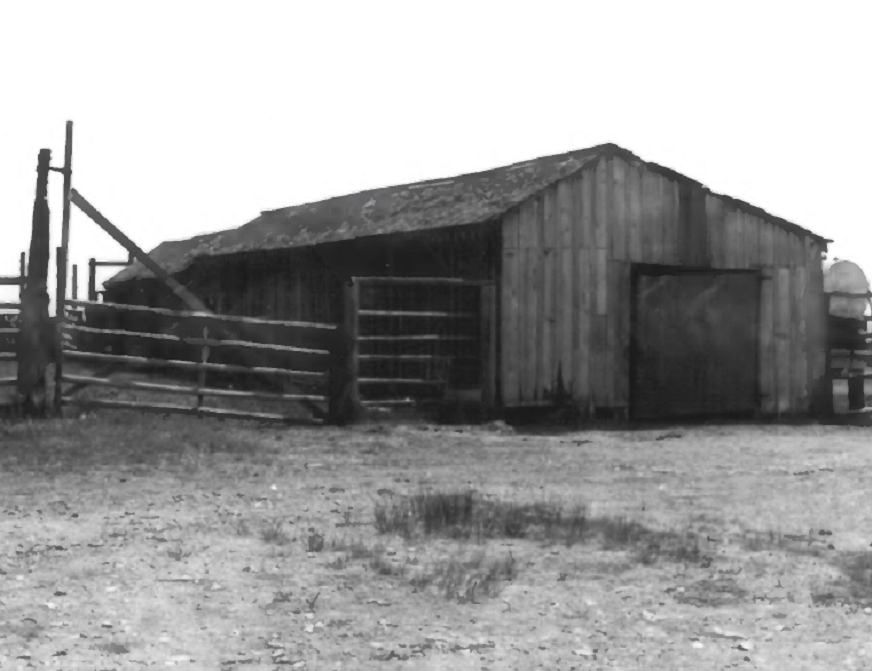
Carriage shed

== Location ==
The Sod House Ranch Historic District is located within the Malheur National Wildlife Refuge in southeastern Oregon. The historic district covers 10 acres (0.040 km^{2}). The site is approximately 1 mile (1.6 km) south of Malheur Lake and 1 mile (1.6 km) west of the Donner und Blitzen River. The elevation of the ranch is 4,104 feet (1,251 m) above sea level.

The Sod House Ranch is 25 miles (40 km) southeast of Burns, Oregon in direct line. From Burns, travel east on Oregon Route 78 for 2 miles (3.2 km); then turn south on Oregon Route 205. Follow Route 205 for 23 miles (37 km) before turning east on the Narrows-Princeton Road. Approximately 4 miles (6.4 km) from that junction, turn south on the Sod House Ranch access road. Follow the access road for 1 mile (1.6 km) to reach the historic ranch site.
