= Riddle Ranch =

- Riddle Brothers Ranch
- U.S. National Register of Historic Places
- U.S. Historic district
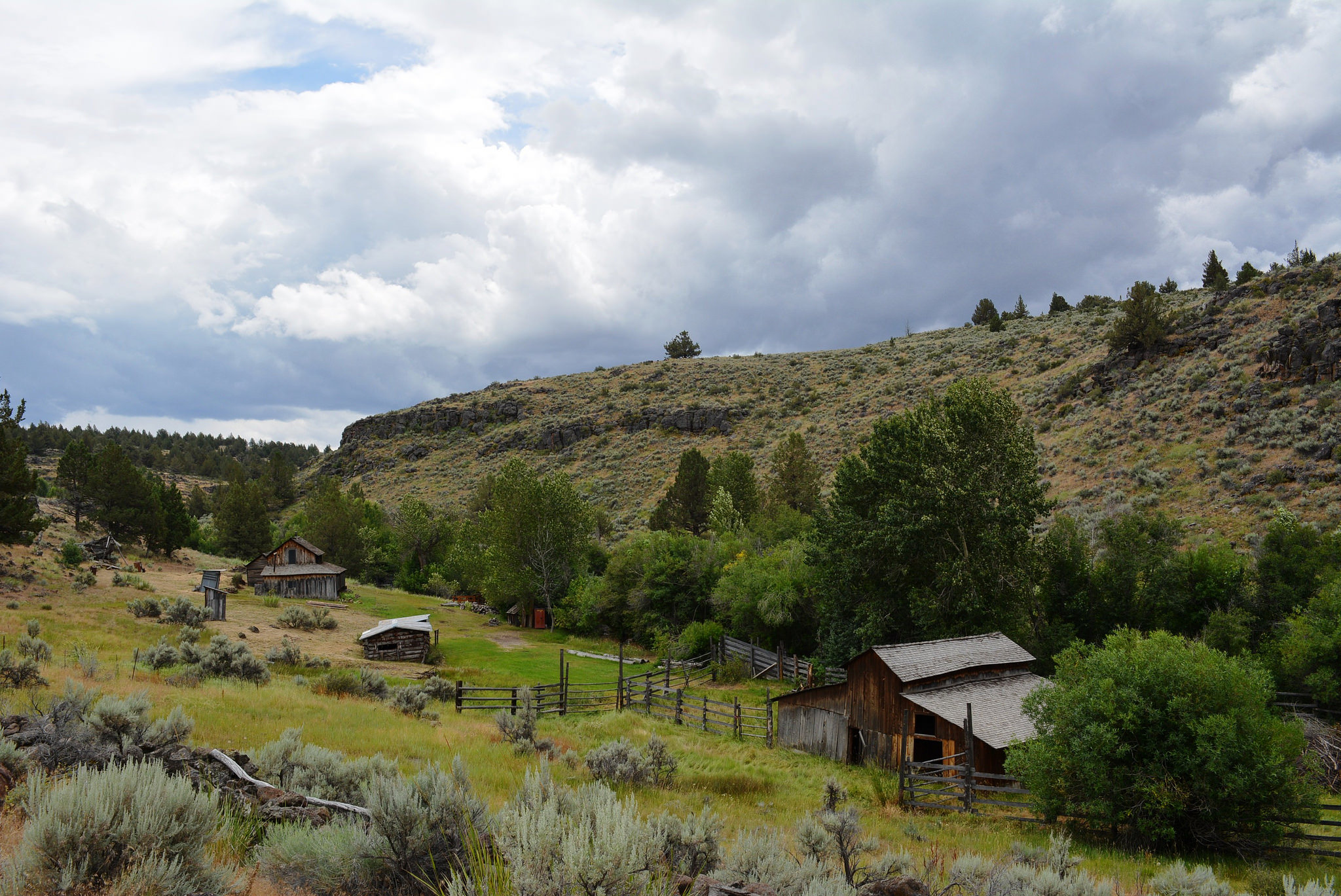
- Riddle Brothers Ranch National Historic District

- Location within Oregon Location within the United States
- Location: Harney County, Oregon
- Nearest city: Frenchglen, Oregon
- Coordinates: 42.6760625°N 118.7663125°W
- Built: 1900–1950s
- Architect: Benjamin, Frederick, and Walter Riddle
- Architectural style: Rustic
- NRHP reference No.: 91000614
- Added to NRHP: 1991

The Riddle Brothers Ranch is a pioneer ranch complex located in the Steens Mountain Cooperative Management and Protection Area in Harney County in eastern Oregon, United States. It is a rare extant example of the small family ranch. The ranch is located on both sides of the Little Blitzen River on public land and is administered by the Bureau of Land Management.

The Riddle family patriarchs were pioneers, first settling the town of Riddle in Douglas County, Oregon. The second generation, Tobias "Stilly" Riddle and his wife, Sarah Smyth Riddle, then moved to Eastern Oregon, eventually settling with Smyth kin in Happy Valley. (Riddle Mountain also takes its name from the family.) Frederick Riddle was one of the first white children born in Harney County.

In 1878 the Riddle Ranch in Happy Valley was burned out during the Native American wars. Peter French, manager of the vast P Ranch, bought the Riddles' Happy Valley property for $30,000, and the family returned to Douglas County. Benjamin Riddle was the first member of the third generation to return to the area, followed by his elder brothers Fred and Walter, sister Carrie, and uncle George. Each of them acquired adjacent land and contributed labor to expand and run the ranch. Fred and Walter remained on the ranch for some fifty years, Fred managing the homestead while Walt handled the cattle and the annual herd drive to Winnemucca. Today, the ranch is maintained as an open-air museum with original artifacts displayed where they were used. Visitors can explore the ranch buildings, hike, or fish; however, camping is not permitted. There are a number of Native American archeological sites on the ranch property. These sites are not open to the public. The Riddle Brothers Ranch is listed as a historic district on the National Register of Historic Places.

== History ==
Native Americans inhabited the Steens Mountain area around the Riddle Brothers Ranch for 10,000 years prior to the arrival of European explorers in the early 19th century. The first recorded exploration of the area was by fur traders between 1826 and 1829. Peter Skene Ogden also explored the area a few years later. In 1845, Steven Meeks led a wagon train through the area, mistaking the snow-covered Steens for the Cascade Mountains.

In 1860, the United States Army sent Major Enoch Steen to protect settlers in the area and determine the feasibility of building a road from the Willamette Valley to southeastern Oregon. His party named many topographic features including Steens Mountain. In 1864, Captain George B. Curry led a unit of the 1st Oregon Cavalry through the area. The cavalrymen crossed a river on the west slope of Steens during a violent thunderstorm. Curry named the river Donder und Blitzen, which in German means thunder and lightning. Over time, it became known as the Donner und Blitzen River.

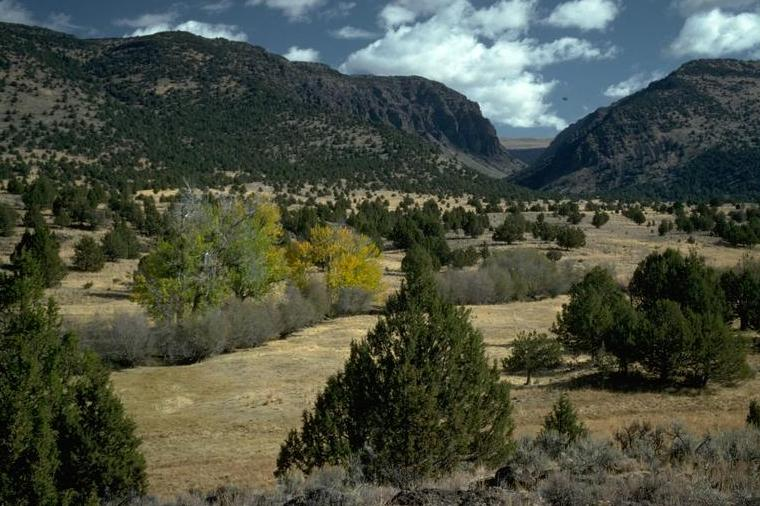
Riddle brother's ranch land in the Little Blitzen Valley

Settlers brought cattle into the area in 1872. Scott Catterson, a rancher from Iowa, claimed the land and built the first cabins at the site of the Riddle Brothers Ranch buildings prior to 1900. (The original sod-roof home is now a toolshed; Catterson later built a larger one-story log cabin from which the current ranch house was developed.) The Riddles later obtained Catterson's squatter's claim. When the Riddle brothers arrived around 1900, there were 100,000 cattle and sheep grazing the open range in valleys on Steens. The three brothers, Walter, Frederick, and Benjamin; their sister, Carrie, and uncle, George Riddle, settled along the Little Blitzen River, and began raising mules and horses for the US military market. Following mechanization of the military after World War 1, the family began running cattle. The Riddles increased their land holding on both sides of the river to 1,120 acres (4.5 km^{2}), eventually gaining control of all the water in the area. Without access to water, the nearby open range land was useless to other ranchers.

The Riddle brothers lived on their ranch for fifty years. None of the brothers ever married. In 1952, Fred Riddle, the last of the brothers, sold the ranch to Rex Clemens, a lumberman and philanthropist from Philomath, Or. Clemens continued to raise livestock on the property for more than thirty years, and carefully preserved the historic buildings. In 1986, the Bureau of Land Management purchased the property from Rex's widow, Ethel Clemens, with the stipulation that the site be preserved. Since then, the Bureau of Land Management's Burns District has maintained the ranch as an historic site. In 1991, the Riddle Brothers Ranch was listed as a historic district on the National Register of Historic Places.

In 2003, Bureau of Land Management archaeologists identified the first of 48 prehistoric sites on the Riddle property. These archeological sites are collectively known as the Mortar Riddle Site.

== Ranch environment ==
The Riddle Brothers Ranch National Historic District covers 1,120 acres (4.5 km^{2}), including 850 acres (3.4 km^{2}) that also falls within the Donner und Blitzen Wild and Scenic River system. The ranch is mostly meadow land, which is irrigated by a series of ditches. The meadow vegetation includes both native and non-native plant species. Native species include redtop, tufted hairgrass, Nebraska sedge, and Cusick's bluegrass. The non-native species include Timothy-grass and Kentucky bluegrass. The riparian area along the Little Blitzen River and seasonal drainages are dominated by black cottonwood, alder, and willow trees. It is considered to be one of the best preserved riparian zones in the Great Basin. Sagebrush and Western juniper are common on upland slopes and undeveloped parts of the ranch.

== Structures ==
There are eight historic buildings and a number of other historic structures located in the national historic district. The historic buildings are in two groupings. The main ranch complex includes a house, bunkhouse, barn, root cellar, chicken coop (now derelict), bath house, blacksmith shop with adjoining tack room, and several corrals built of willow and juniper. Another group of structures, site of the Ben Riddle homestead, includes a cabin, root cellar, and stone storage building. All of the structures on the ranch were built using logs, weatherboard, hand-cut shingles, and local stone. The original homestead cabin, now a toolshed, had a stone fireplace at one end; the stone was removed and used elsewhere in the 1960s-1970s. The ranch house began as a single-story cabin of cottonwood logs. After Fred purchased the property, neighbors helped him put on a second story. A tent kitchen was later converted to an interior kitchen, and a large sleeping porch was built across the front of the house. The bathhouse also began as a tent and acquired walls during the Clemens years. The current barn is the second on the property; the Riddles built it in the 1930s using wood salvaged from the former town of Blitzen Crossing. Walter Riddle's homesteading cabin was destroyed by a wildfire in 1996; the chimney remains at the mouth of the Little Blitzen Canyon. The site of Carrie Riddle Parsley's cabin, further up the Little Blitzen, is recognizable from the rhubarb she planted.

The Bureau of Land Management has preserved the ranch complex in order to give visitors a feel for the living conditions experienced by pioneer ranch families in eastern Oregon. The Bureau of Land Management has stabilized and restored the main buildings and many of the other structures. The repair work added structural support and replaced deteriorating elements of the buildings; however, the BLM was careful not to alter the character of the historic structures during the restoration and preservation process.

There are several modern buildings at the ranch. The Bureau of Land Management maintains an administrative building (the former Rex Clemens house) and several corrals adjacent to the main ranch complex. There is also a small caretaker cabin located on the west side of the Little Blitzen River and a public vault toilet.

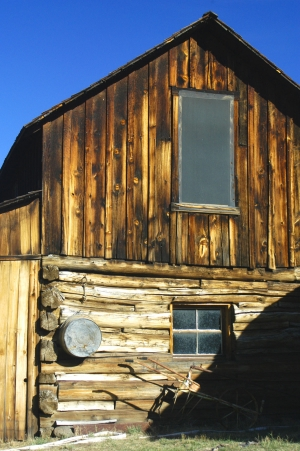
*Frederick Riddle's ranch house, south side, showing the Catterson log cabin, and the upstairs and porch additions built by the Riddles.

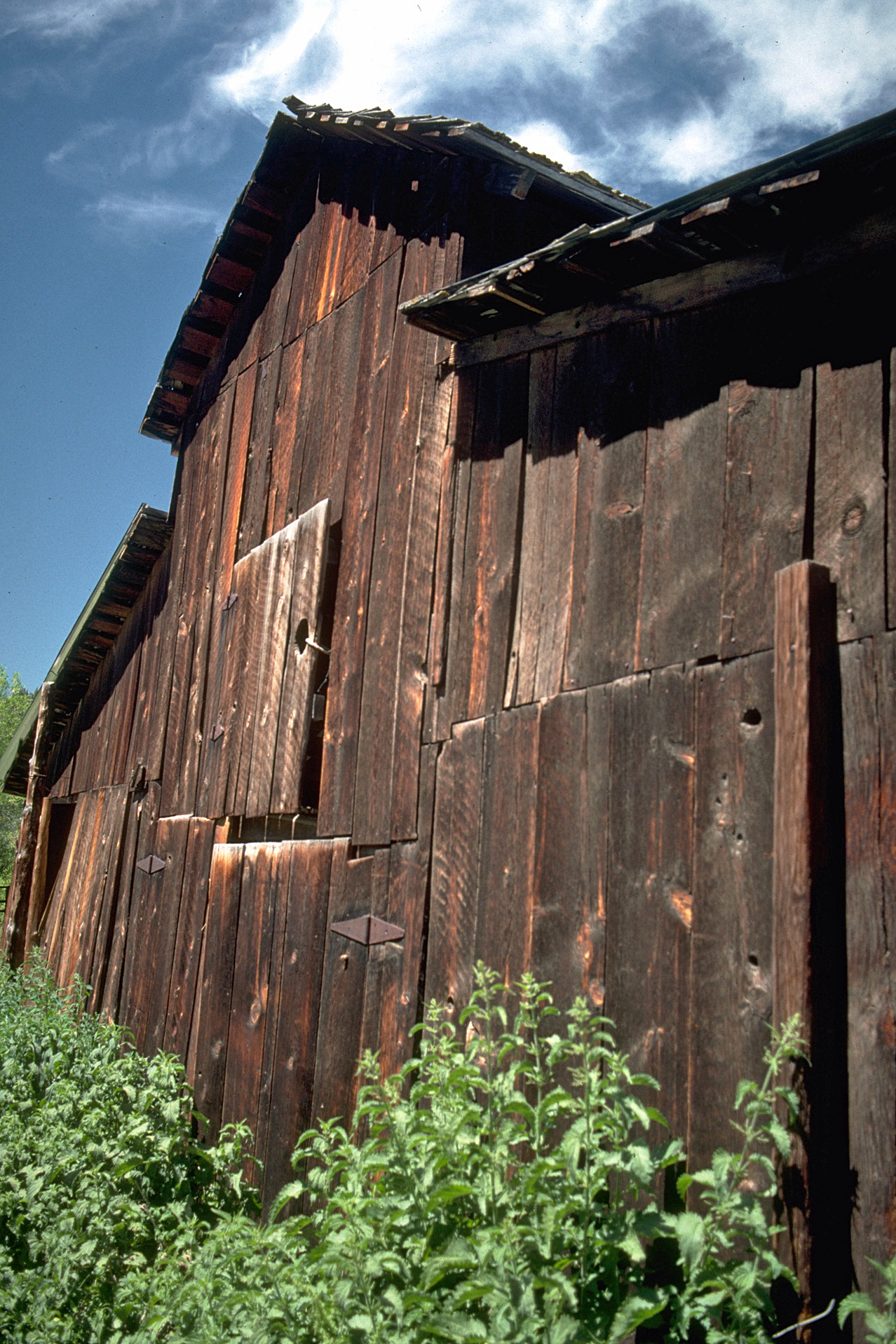
*Riddle Brothers' barn

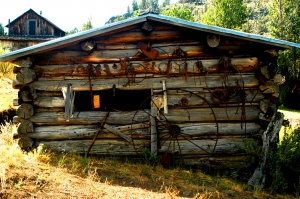
*Blacksmith and tool shop, north side of the original Catterson homestead cabin. Roof was converted by Riddles from sod to tin.

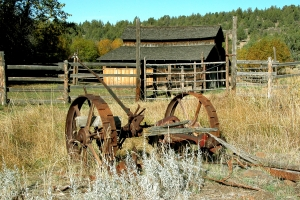
*Old farm equipment

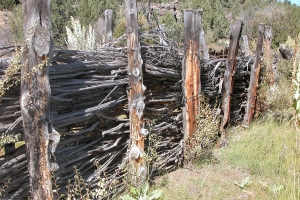
*Willow branch corral

== Recreation ==
Several thousand people visit the Riddle Brothers Ranch each year. Visitors enjoy exploring the historic ranch buildings, hiking, fishing, horseback riding, and photography. The historic structures scattered across the ranch property offer the opportunity to see how pioneer ranchers lived. However, visitors must be careful not to disturb any historical artifacts or structures. The Frederick Riddle house, Benjamin Riddle house, the bunkhouse, and ranch barn were all built or modified by the Riddle brothers using locally available materials, and are popular subjects for photographers. Hikers can access the Steens Mountain Wilderness from the Cold Spring Road north of the ranch, or can trek cross-country to the Little Blitzen Gorge east of the ranch. The Levi Brinkley Memorial Trail provides access to the confluence of the Little Blitzen and the Donner und Blitzen rivers. It is an easy hike and a popular spot for fishing. The Desert Meadow Trail loops up above the ranch to a waterhole and the Riddles' reservoir, where wild horses and antelope may be seen. Built in 2017, the very rough Fred Riddle Trail provides access between the Little Blitzen Trail and Cold Springs Road. The Little Blitzen River is popular for catch-and-release fishing for Redband trout. The river, along with 850 acres (3.4 km^{2}) of the ranch property, fall within the Donner und Blitzen Wild and Scenic River system. This expands the recreational opportunities along the river beyond the ranch itself.

== Mortar Riddle archeological site ==
In prehistoric times, the Riddle Brothers Ranch area was an ideal location for Native American people to live. It is located near a dependable water supply. There is ample firewood, game is plentiful, and a number of edible plants grow in the vicinity. Because of these conditions, this area may have been in continuous use as a base camp for as much as 14,000 years.

In the summer of 2003, Bureau of Land Management archaeologists began exploring the Riddle Brothers Ranch for signs of prehistoric sites. During the first season, archaeologists unearthed 42 arrowheads and spear points and 89 stone tools including a large number of mortars. Mortars are a common find at archeological sites, but it is rare to find a large number in one location. As a result, the site was named the Mortar Riddle Site.

In 2004, the University of Wisconsin–Milwaukee joined the Bureau of Land Management team expanding the excavations to new areas. By the end of that season, 65 mortars and over 200 arrow and spear points had been found. The oldest points may be as much as 6,000 years old. In the second season, archaeologists also found United States Army buttons. This shows that the inhabitants of this site had contact with the United States military before it was abandoned, probably sometime between the 1840s and 1880s.

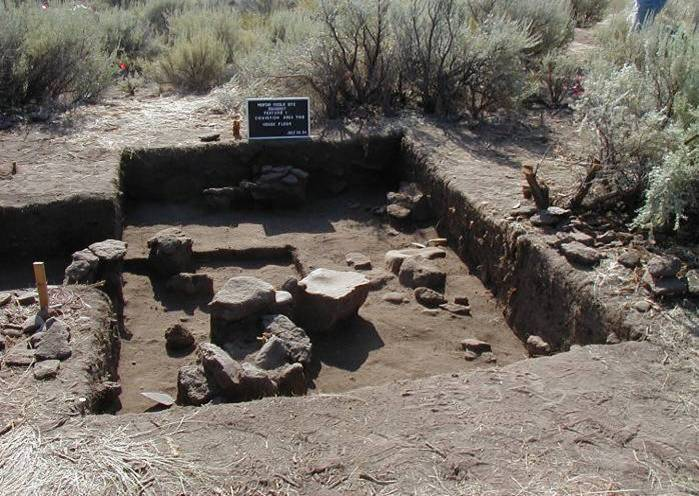
*Open excavation pit

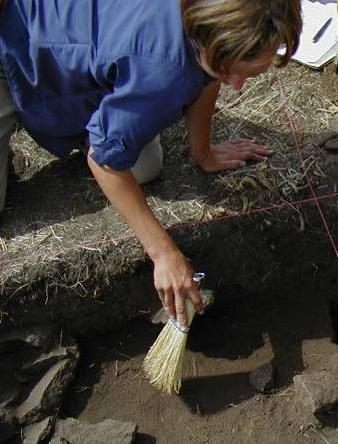
*Site excavation work

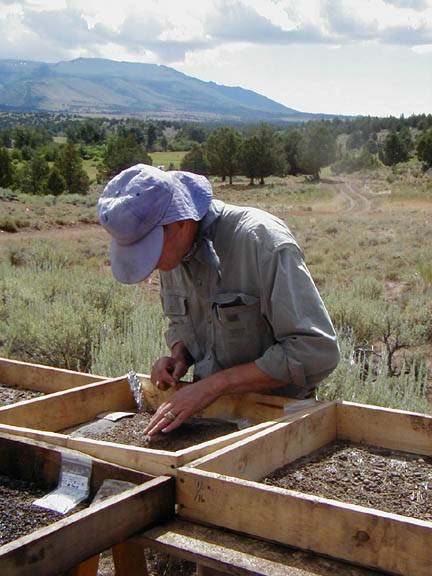
*Screening artifacts

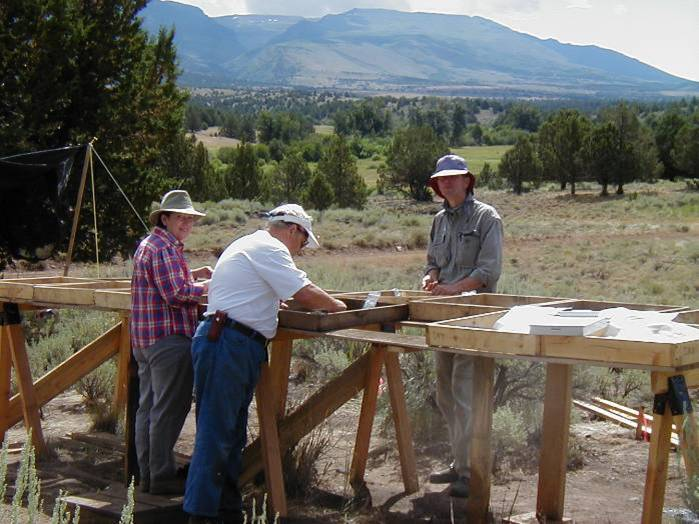
*Archeology volunteers

As of 2005, archaeologists had identified 48 prehistoric sites on the Riddle property. Volunteers from the Oregon Archaeological Society have joined the Bureau of Land Management and the University Wisconsin–Milwaukee archeologists working on the site. Because the excavation sites are fragile, they are not open to the public.

== Location ==
To get to the Riddle Brothers Ranch from Burns, Oregon take State Highway 78. Travel southeast for approximately two miles. Turn right onto State Highway 205, and travel south for 60 miles (97 km) to Frenchglen, Oregon. Continue on State Highway 205 through Frenchglen nine miles (14 km) to "P" Hill; then turn left on the Steens Mountain Loop Road. The turnoff to the Riddle brothers' ranch is approximately 18 miles (29 km) from the State Highway 205 junction.

Because of its remote location, travelers should call the Bureau of Land Management's Burns Office to ensure the ranch is open before departing. The one-lane road to the Riddle Brothers Ranch is rough, especially during wet conditions but was significantly improved in 2016. The ranch access road is not recommended for travel trailers. The Bureau of Land Management recommends a high clearance vehicle be used when traveling to the ranch. Also, it is worth noting that cell phone service does not reach the Riddle Brothers Ranch area. However, local law enforcement officers visit the ranch periodically.

Caretakers are on site and the ranch is typically open for vehicle access from June - September, Wednesday-Sunday, 9am-5 pm, weather permitting. When closed to vehicle access, visitors can park their vehicles at the ranch gate and walk approximately 1.25 miles to the main cluster of buildings around the Fred Riddle house. Access by foot, bicycle, or horseback is always permitted. There is a public vault toilet at the ranch, and potable water from the hose spigots. Camping is not allowed on the property so visitors must leave in the evening before the caretaker locks the entrance gate at 5 pm. For those who want to camp in the area, the South Steens Campground is only three miles away.
