= Frenchglen School District 16 =

School district in Oregon, United States

Frenchglen School District 16 is a school district headquartered in Frenchglen, Oregon. The district is entirely in Harney County. It has one K-8 school, Frenchglen Elementary School.

== History ==
The school began operations in 1927. An individual named Walt Riddle bought all of the school building bonds to make the existence of a school a certainty. In the 1980-1981 school year there were two students, until one moved away, meaning that towards the end of the school year the school had one student. That year, a single position was for superintendent and principal and teacher. According to Thomas J. Walsh, a freelance journalist, someone told him that the enrollment was six in 1994, and this had increased to 11 in 1995. Historically, the school housed teachers in the Frenchglen Hotel.

== Culture ==
A Christmas musical is held at the school each year; audiences come from around the county. A potluck accompanies the musical. In May 2007 the Frenchglen board of trustees ended a music program for financial reasons; this would impact the musical. Area parents created the Frenchglen Education Foundation to raise money to preserve music classes, which would in turn preserve the musical.

== Feeder patterns ==
High school students are assigned to Crane Union High School, in Crane, a part of Harney County Union High School District 1J.
