= Frenchglen Hotel State Heritage Site =

- Frenchglen Hotel
- U.S. National Register of Historic Places
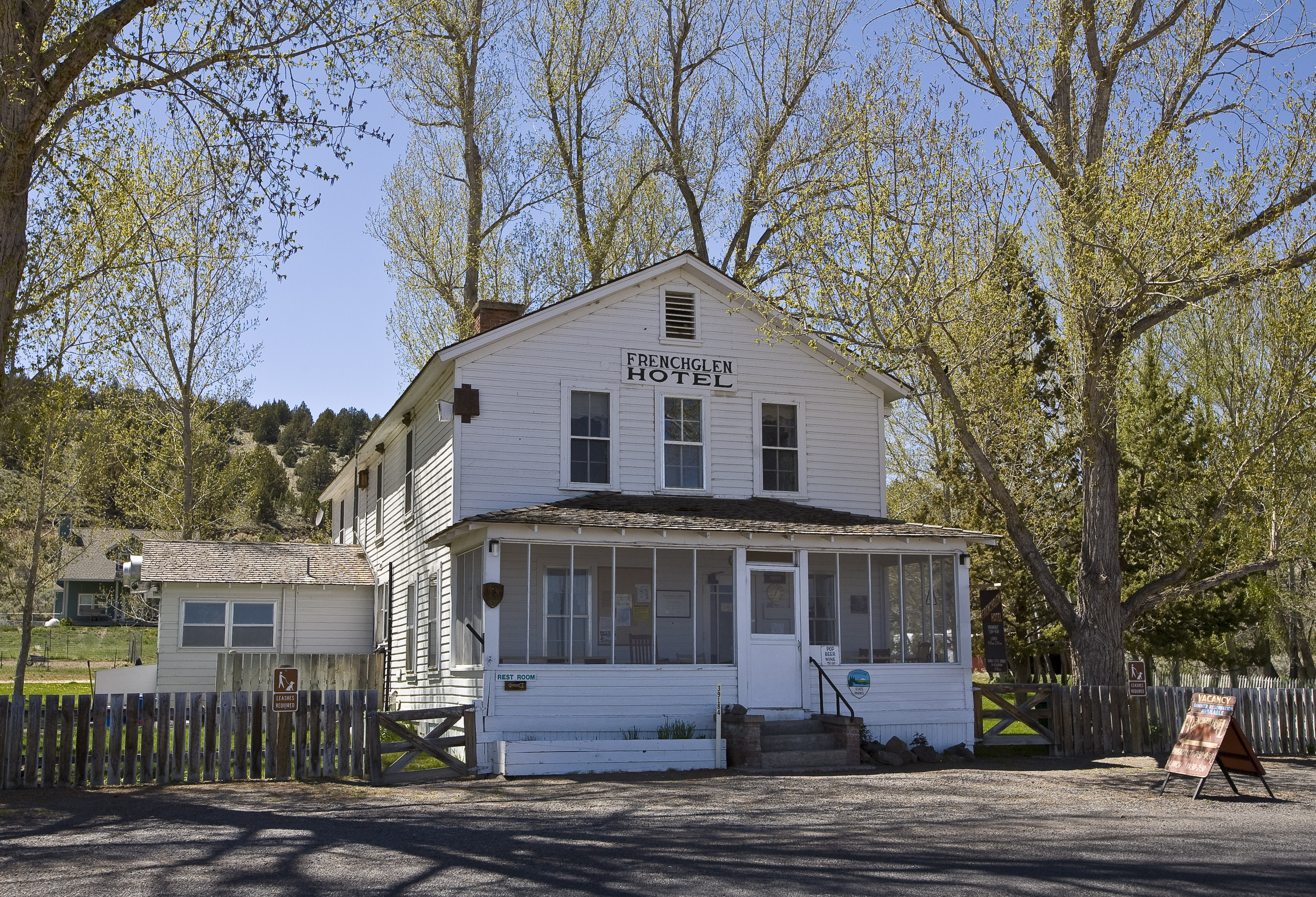

- Location within Oregon Location within the United States
- Location: OR 205, Frenchglen, Oregon
- Coordinates: 42°49′35″N 118°54′53″W
- Area: 2.4 acres (0.97 ha)
- Built: 1924
- Architectural style: Bungalow/Craftsman, American Foursquare
- NRHP reference No.: 84000469
- Added to NRHP: November 15, 1984

The Frenchglen Hotel State Heritage Site is a hotel in the sparsely populated southeast part of Oregon, United States. It is located in the unincorporated community of Frenchglen, near the base of Steens Mountain and at the northern end of the loop road that ascends almost to the mountain's summit above 9,000 feet (2,700 m).

The hotel was built in 1924. In its early days, its guests typically had business at Peter French's P Ranch or were visiting the Malheur National Wildlife Refuge. From 1937 to 1938, the hotel was restored and enlarged by the U.S. Bureau of Sport Fisheries and Wildlife, with labor from the Civilian Conservation Corps. Historically, teachers for the Frenchglen School stayed in the hotel.

The Oregon Parks and Recreation Department took possession of the property in 1973. The site was added to the National Register of Historic Places in 1984.

Today, the historic hotel building has eight guest rooms, and an additional modern building, the Drovers' Inn, accommodates overflow guests. It also has a dining room. Guests still visit for the wildlife refuge, as well as nearby Steens Mountain.
