= Oregon Route 78 =

State highway in eastern Oregon, US

Oregon Route 78
- Route 78 highlighted in red

Route information
- Maintained by ODOT
- Length: 91.55 mi (147.34 km)
- Existed: 1932–present

Major junctions
- West end: US 20 / US 395 in Burns
- OR 205 near Burns
- East end: US 95 in Burns Junction

Location
- Country: United States
- State: Oregon
- Counties: Harney, Malheur

Highway system
- Oregon Highways; Interstate; US; State; Named; Scenic
← OR 74	→ I-82

Oregon Route 78 is an Oregon state highway running from Burns in Harney County to Burns Junction in Malheur County. OR 78 is known as the Steens Highway No. 442 (see Oregon highways and routes). It is 91.55 miles (147.34 km) long and runs northwest to southeast.

== Route description ==
OR 78 begins at an intersection with US 20 and US 395 in Burns and continues southeast through Crane and New Princeton to Burns Junction, where it ends at an intersection with US 95.

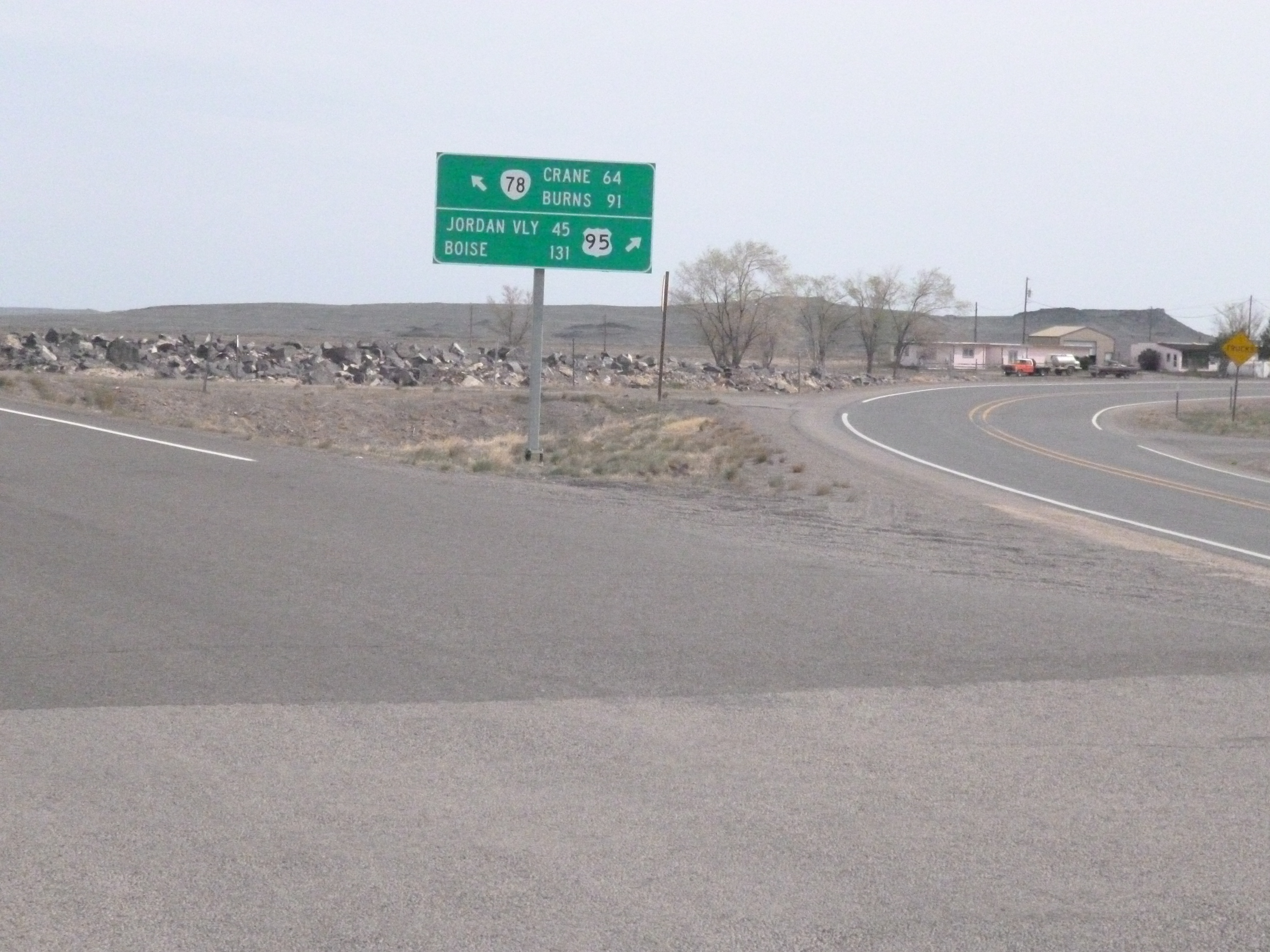
Intersection of US 95 and Oregon Route 78

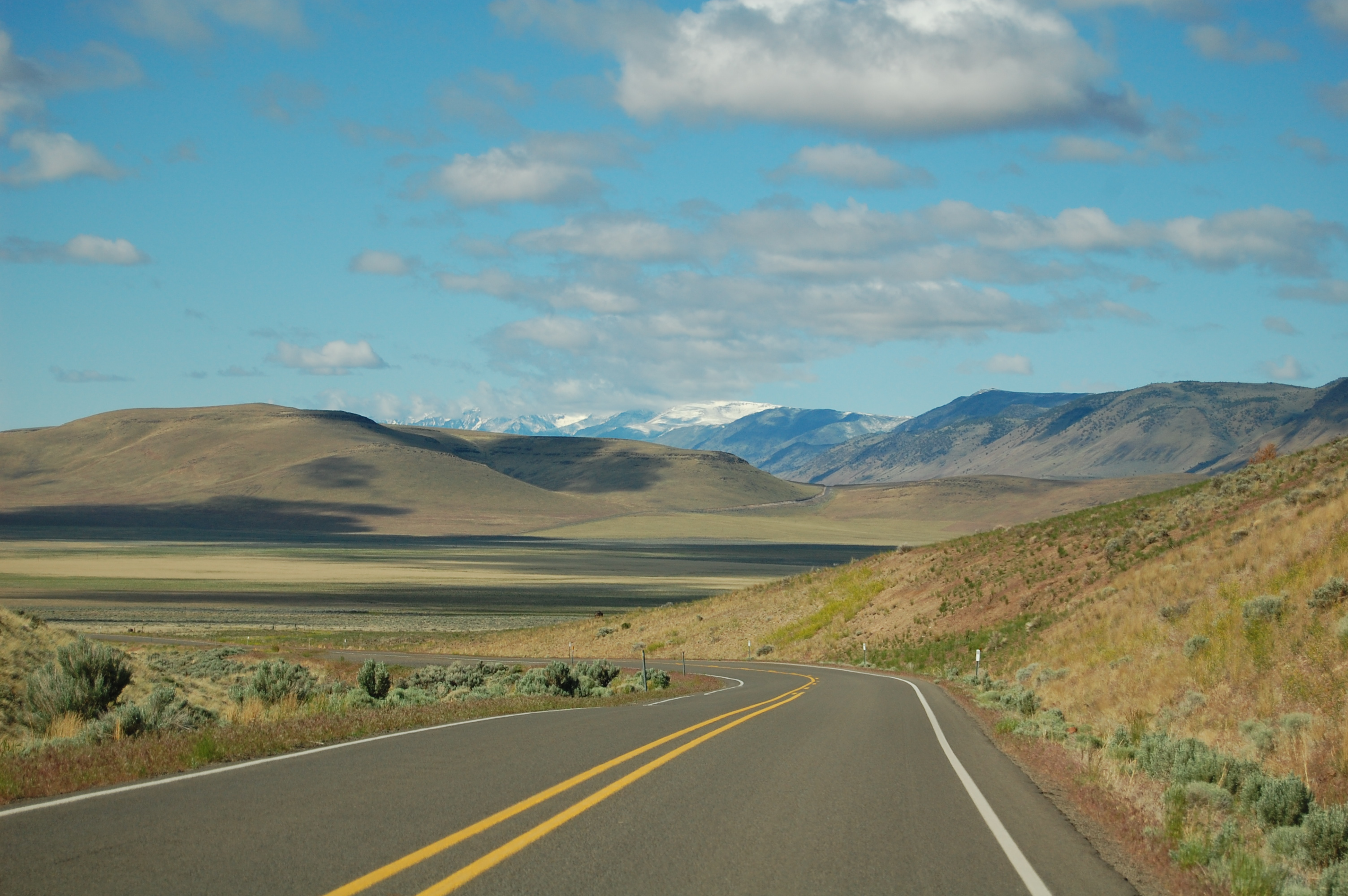
Steens Mountain from OR 78

== History ==
OR 78 was assigned to the Burns-Crane Highway No. 24 when the Oregon route numbering system was initiated in 1932.

== Major intersections ==
County	Location	mi	km	Destinations	Notes
Harney	Burns	0.00	0.00	US 20 / US 395 – John Day, Ontario, Lakeview, Bend	
Harney		1.73	2.78	OR 205 – Frenchglen, Denio	
Malheur	Burns Junction	91.55	147.34	US 95 – Jordan Valley, Boise, McDermitt, Winnemucca	
1.000 mi = 1.609 km; 1.000 km = 0.621 mi

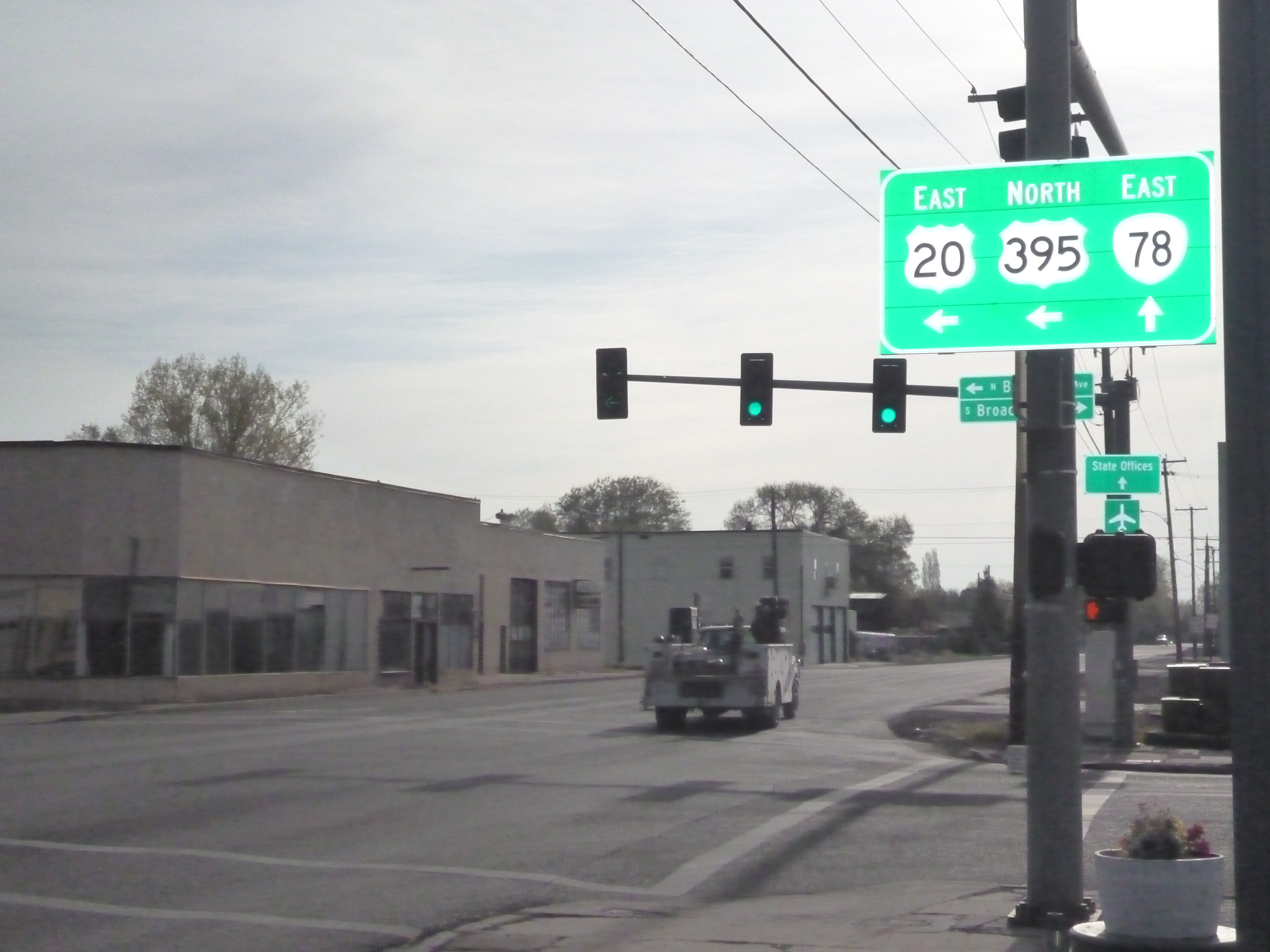
US 20 & US 395, Oregon Route 78 Intersection
