= Oregon Route 205 =

State highway in Harney County, Oregon, US

Oregon Route 205
- Route 205 highlighted in red

Route information
- Maintained by ODOT
- Length: 73.35 mi (118.05 km)
- Tourist routes: High Desert Discovery Scenic Byway

Major junctions
- South end: Roaring Springs Ranch
- North end: OR 78 near Burns

Location
- Country: United States
- State: Oregon
- Counties: Harney

Highway system
- Oregon Highways; Interstate; US; State; Named; Scenic
← I-205	→ OR 206

Oregon Route 205 (OR 205) is a state highway in Harney County, Oregon, running from Roaring Springs Ranch to OR 78 near Burns. OR 205 is known as the Frenchglen Highway No. 440 (see Oregon highways and routes). It is 73.35 miles (118.05 km) long and runs north–south, connecting the Malheur National Wildlife Refuge to Burns. The highway has also been designated the High Desert Discovery Scenic Byway by the Bureau of Land Management. Part of OR 205 also is used in the Steens Mountain Back Country Byway, a loop road around Steens Mountain.

== Route description ==
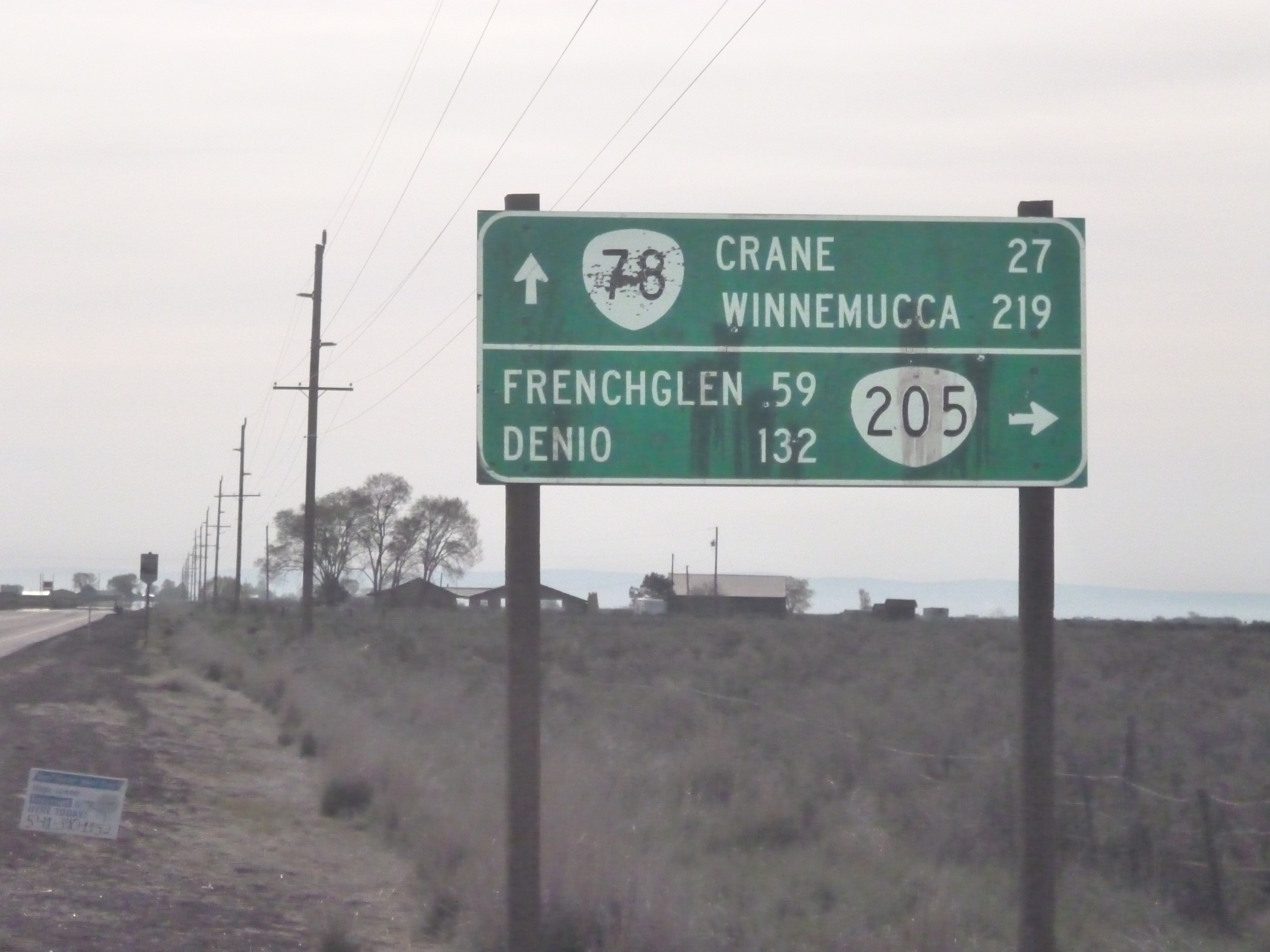
Intersection of OR 78 and OR 205

OR 205 begins at the Roaring Springs Ranch as a continuation of Catlow Valley Road, which connects with Nevada State Route 292 near Denio, Nevada. It travels north along the edge of the Catlow Valley and turns east to enter Frenchglen in Blitzen Valley. The highway continues north on the rim of Jackass Mountain through parts of the Malheur National Wildlife Refuge, crossing between Harney Lake and Malheur Lake in Sunset Valley. After briefly turning west to cross Wrights Point, OR 205 continues due north through Harney Valley and terminates at a junction with OR 78 east of Burns.

== Major intersections ==
The entire route is in Harney County.

Location	mi	km	Destinations	Notes
	0.00	0.00	Roaring Springs Ranch	Continues as Catlow Valley Road
Burns	73.35	118.05	OR 78 – Burns, Crane	
1.000 mi = 1.609 km; 1.000 km = 0.621 mi
