= Frenchglen, Oregon =

Unincorporated community in the state of Oregon, United States

- Unincorporated community
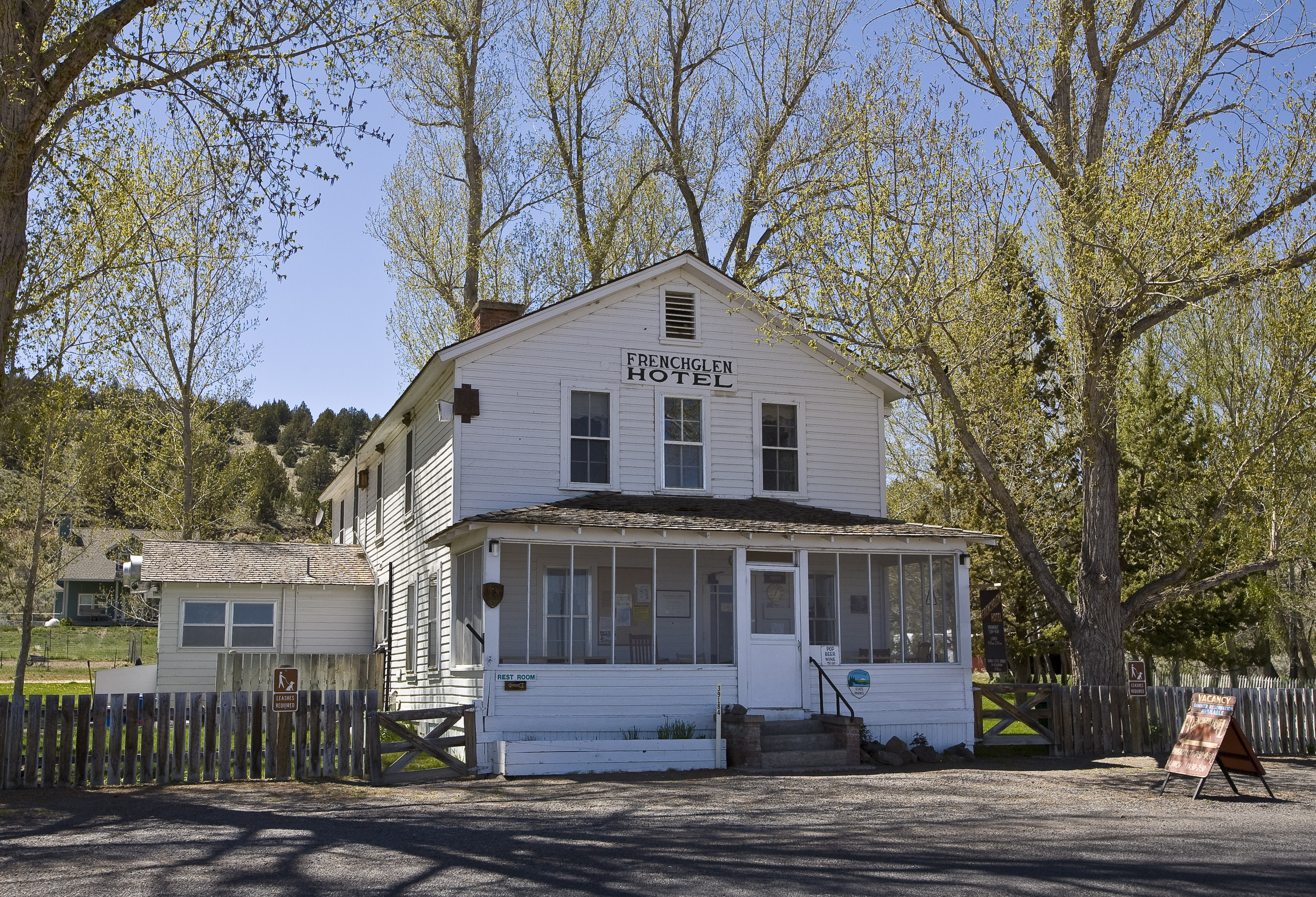
- The historic Frenchglen Hotel

- Location within Oregon Location within the United States
- Coordinates: 42°49′37″N 118°54′56″W
- Country: United States
- State: Oregon
- County: Harney
- Elevation: 4,203 ft (1,281 m)

Population
  - Estimate (2010): 12
- Time zone: UTC-8 (Pacific)
  - Summer (DST): UTC-7 (Pacific)
- ZIP Code: 97736
- Area code: 541
- GNIS feature ID: 1136302

Frenchglen is an unincorporated community in Harney County, Oregon, United States. It is 60 miles (97 km) south of Burns on Oregon Route 205.

Frenchglen is near Steens Mountain and Malheur National Wildlife Refuge, and is home to the historic Frenchglen Hotel, an Oregon State Heritage Site built in 1917.

== History ==
The community is named after the French-Glenn Livestock Company, founded by Hugh J. Glenn and later joined by his son-in-law, Peter French. French-Glenn built its headquarters there in 1872. The post office took the name Frenchglen after it was moved there.

== Education ==
The zoned K-8 school is Frenchglen Elementary School (of Frenchglen School District 16). The school began operations in 1927.

High school students are assigned to Crane Union High School, in Crane, Oregon, a part of Harney County Union High School District 1J.

Harney County is not in a community college district but has a "contract out of district" (COD) with Treasure Valley Community College. TVCC operates the Burns Outreach Center in Burns.

== Healthcare ==
In 1989, Nellie Nix of The Bulletin described the catchment area of Harney District Hospital in Burns as being Harney County. In 2005 Matthew Preusch of The Oregonian, citing the lack of doctors and long distances between the southern part of the county and the hospital, described the southern part of Harney County, which includes Frenchglen, as "the most medically underserved area of all."

== Gallery ==
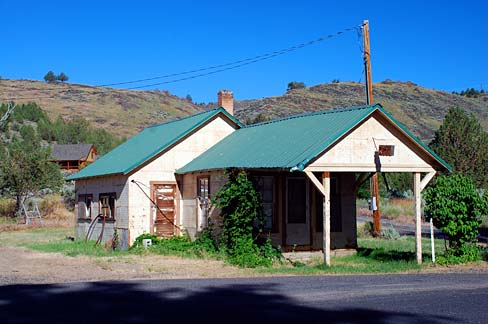
An old building in Frenchglen

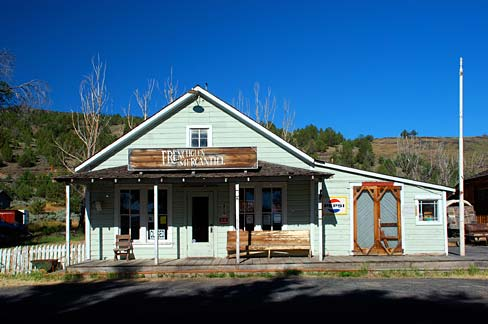
Frenchglen Mercantile building in Frenchglen

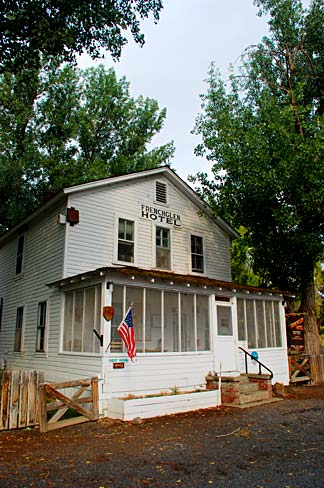
Frenchglen Hotel
