= National Register of Historic Places listings in Malheur County, Oregon =

Location of Malheur County in Oregon

This list presents the full set of buildings, structures, objects, sites, or districts designated on the National Register of Historic Places in Malheur County, Oregon, United States, and offers brief descriptive information about each of them. The National Register recognizes places of national, state, or local historic significance across the United States. Out of over 90,000 National Register sites nationwide, Oregon is home to over 2,000, and 19 of those are found in Malheur County.

This National Park Service list is complete through NPS recent listings posted November 21, 2025.

== Current listings ==
	Name on the Register	Image	Date listed	Location	City or town	Description
1	Birch Creek Ranch Historic Rural Landscape	Birch Creek Ranch Historic Rural Landscape	August 25, 1997 (#97000882)	On the Owyhee River at its confluence with Birch Creek; 43°12′54″N 117°30′12″W	Jordan Valley vicinity	
2	James Rowley and Mary J. Blackaby House	James Rowley and Mary J. Blackaby House	December 28, 2001 (#01001391)	717 SW 2nd St. 44°01′14″N 116°58′04″W	Ontario	
3	Jean Baptiste Charbonneau Memorial and Inskip Station Ruins	Jean Baptiste Charbonneau Memorial and Inskip Station Ruins	March 14, 1973 (#73001577)	N of Danner off US 95; 42°52′00″N 117°20′15″W	Danner	
4	First Bank of Vale	First Bank of Vale	March 5, 1992 (#92000132)	148 Main St. S. 43°58′54″N 117°14′20″W	Vale	
5	Green Lantern Saloon	Green Lantern Saloon	September 6, 1996 (#96000980)	11 S. 1st St. 43°52′35″N 116°59′38″W	Nyssa	
6	Moses and Mary Hart Stone House and Ranch Complex	Moses and Mary Hart Stone House and Ranch Complex	October 1, 2001 (#01000498)	1 mile (1.6 km) west of Post Office on Bully Creek County Rd. 43°58′53″N 117°43′20″W	Westfall	
7	Hotel Western	Hotel Western	September 6, 1996 (#96000981)	9 Good Ave. 43°52′33″N 116°59′34″W	Nyssa	
8	Old Stone House	Old Stone House	May 19, 1972 (#72001085)	283 Main St. S. 43°58′51″N 117°14′22″W	Vale	
9	Oregon Short Line Railroad Depot	Oregon Short Line Railroad Depot	August 5, 1999 (#99000950)	300 Depot Lane; 44°01′26″N 116°57′42″W	Ontario	
10	Oregon Trail Historic District	Oregon Trail Historic District	October 29, 1975 (#75001589)	5 miles (8.0 km) southeast of Vale at Lytle Blvd. 43°54′50″N 117°10′35″W	Vale	
11	Owyhee Dam Historic District	Owyhee Dam Historic District	September 23, 2010 (#10000791)	Owyhee Lake Road; 43°35′31″N 117°14′33″W	Adrian vicinity	Historic district including Owyhee Dam
12	Owyhee Grocery	Owyhee Grocery	May 16, 2025 (#100011836)	2499 OR-201; 43°47′41″N 117°03′21″W	Nyssa vicinity	
13	Pelota Fronton	Pelota Fronton	May 19, 1972 (#72001084)	Bassett St. (U.S. 95); 42°58′28″N 117°03′10″W	Jordan Valley	
14	Rex Theater	Rex Theater	February 25, 2022 (#100007459)	240 A St. West; 43°58′55″N 117°14′30″W	Vale	
15	Sheep Ranch Fortified House	Sheep Ranch Fortified House	November 1, 1974 (#74001695)	3192 Old I-O-N Highway; 42°55′12″N 117°32′50″W	Arock vicinity	
16	Al Thompson and Son's Feed and Seed Company	Al Thompson and Son's Feed and Seed Company	September 6, 1996 (#96000982)	117 Good Ave. 43°52′32″N 116°59′41″W	Nyssa	
17	Vale Drug Store	Vale Drug Store	September 6, 2002 (#02000950)	158 Main St. N. 43°58′56″N 117°14′20″W	Vale	
18	Vale Hotel and Grand Opera House	Vale Hotel and Grand Opera House	August 1, 1984 (#84003032)	123 Main St. S. 43°58′56″N 117°14′43″W	Vale	
19	Vinsonhaler Blacksmith Shop	Vinsonhaler Blacksmith Shop	September 6, 1996 (#96000983)	122 Good Ave. 43°52′34″N 116°59′41″W	Nyssa	

== Former listings ==
	Name on the Register	Image	Date listed	Date removed	Location	City or town	Description
1	Vale Independent Order of Odd Fellows Hall	Vale Independent Order of Odd Fellows Hall	December 6, 2016 (#16000822)	March 6, 2018	122 Main St. S. 43°58′54″N 117°14′23″W	Vale	

== See also ==
- National Register of Historic Places listings in Oregon
- Listings in neighboring counties: Baker, Canyon, Grant, Harney, Humboldt, Owyhee, Payette, Washington
- Historic preservation
- History of Oregon
- Lists of Oregon-related topics
