= First Bank of Vale =

- U.S. National Register of Historic Places
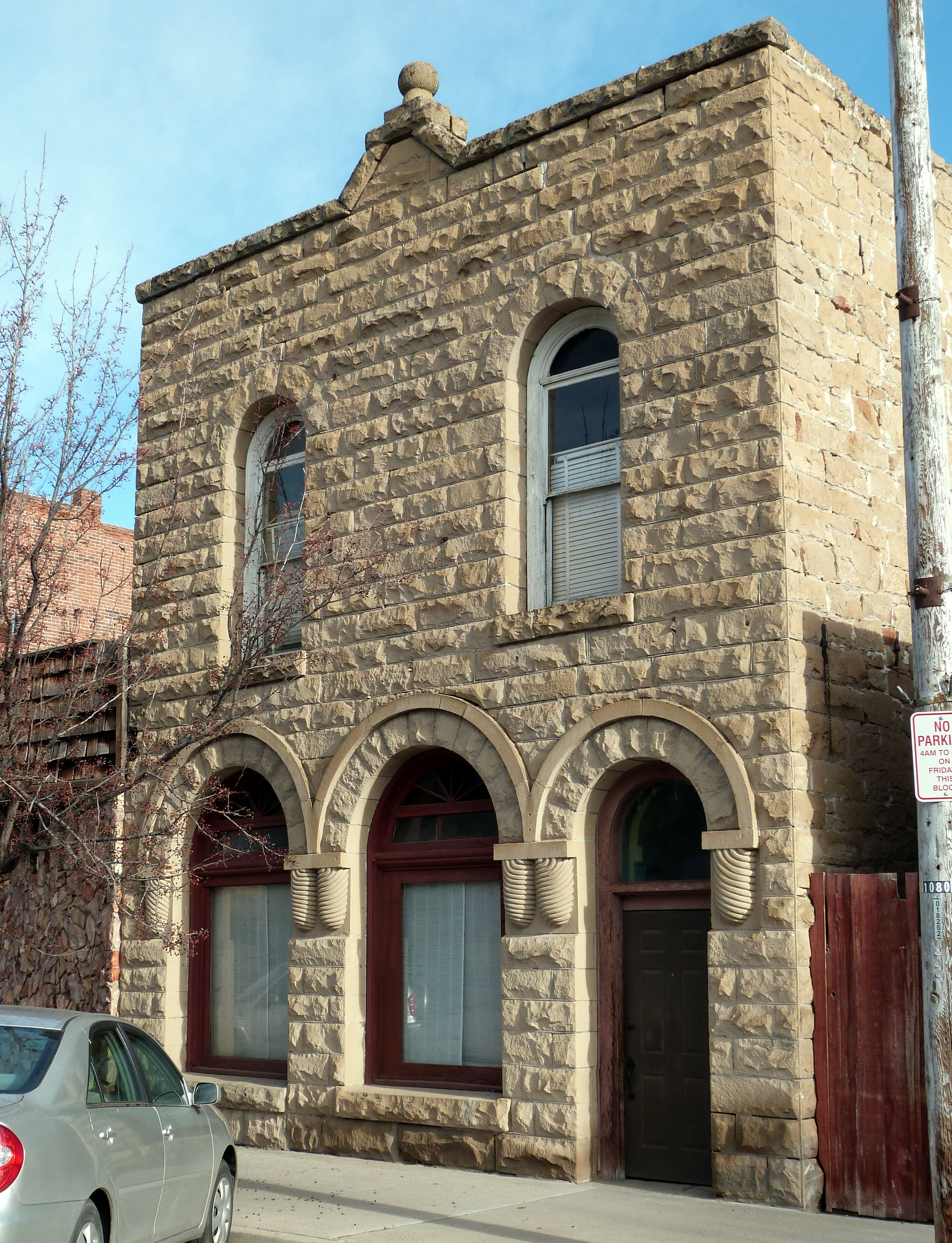
- The building's exterior in 2012

- Location within Oregon Location within the United States
- Location: 148 Main St. S., Vale, Oregon
- Coordinates: 43°58′54″N 117°14′20″W
- Area: 0.1 acres (0.040 ha)
- Built: 1901
- Built by: Milton G. Hope, Isiah W. Hope
- Architectural style: Richardson Romanesque
- NRHP reference No.: 92000132
- Added to NRHP: 5 March 1992

The First Bank of Vale is a historic building located in Vale, Oregon. It was built in 1901 from completely from locally quarried native stone by local pioneers, the Hope brothers. The compact two story building is vernacular architecture of the Richardson Romanesque style. It was listed on the National Register of Historic Places on 5 March 1992.

== History ==
Vale, Oregon was the first permanent settlement on the Oregon Trail in Malheur County. The early permanent structures in Vale, like the First Bank of Vale, were built of native sandstone at the turn of the 20th century. From 1906 on construction included the use of bricks. The erection of a stone hotel in 1872, now known as the Old Stone House is cited as the beginning of the development of the town. Vale became the permanent county seat of Malheur after three competitive elections and the county courthouse was built there in 1902. The First Bank of Vale was built and occupied in 1901 during the construction of the courthouse. It was the first financial institution in Vale to do business in a permanent building.

The bank was built by Milton and Isiah Hope, brothers whose land claims were among the originals in the founding of Vale. The Hope brothers built a home and store of native stone in the 1890s. They were stone masons, merchants and businessmen who were active in the management of the bank and helped fund construction of the courthouse. It is likely one of the brothers was chief builder/architect for the First Bank of Vale building. The First Bank of Vale was incorporated on 17 June 1901 with US$50,000 capital. The bank prospered in the ensuing years, besting a competitor that had come to town, The First National Bank. The First Bank of Vale built a new building in 1908 known as Drexel Hotel which is also listed on the National Register of Historic Places. The original First Bank of Vale building was sold back to the Hope brothers with the opening of the new three story complex (taller than the competitor's 1907 two-story building).

The First Bank of Vale building was remodeled inside c. 1906 with the change of ownership and utilization. It was used for office and retail space until the 1930s or 1940s at that time it was used for family apartments. The property changed hands numerous times after that, at one point Fred Burgess began a project to create a museum in the building. At that time it was known at the Burgess Building. After some time as a private residence the property fell into abandonment. At the time of listing on the National Register, the building was privately owned. The building retains much of its original character and material.

== Setting ==
After the Old Stone House was built in 1872, it was expanded and frame buildings for a stable and blacksmith shop were built. The Hope Brothers Mercantile (Hope Brothers Building) was built in 1893. Together with the First Bank of Vale, this cluster all within one block and fronting on the Oregon Trail formed the downtown core of Vale. The property occupies the North 28.75 feet (8.763 m) of Lot 3, Block 24 of the Original Plat of Vale. It measures 28.75 feet (8.763 m) by 94 feet (28.651 m). This is the entire urban tax lot occupied by the First Bank of Vale from 1901 onward.

The street address is 148 Main Street South (zip code 97918). The building is on the east side of Main St. facing west. The First National Bank is the most intact clear example of vernacular architecture in the Richardson Romanesque style locally. It is one of a number of buildings that form a cluster unified by time period (1895–1907), building materials and Romanesque and Italianate architectural style. The banks character and presence outweigh its small footprint.

== Building ==
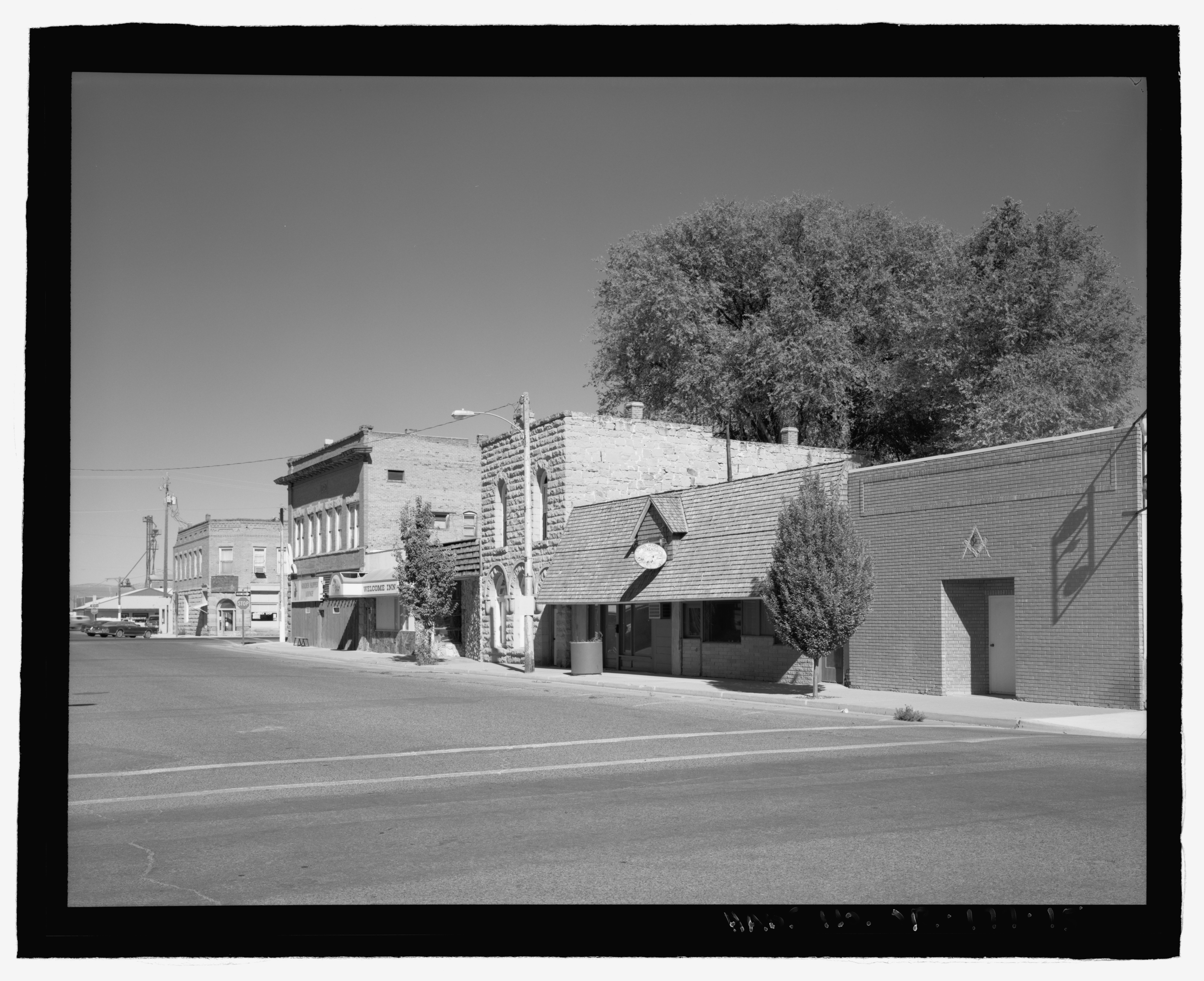
View of the bank with other buildings in the Vale Historic District

The two-story structure is built completely of native stone with no brickwork excepting the four chimneys. The construction is attributed to the Hope Brothers and the stonework and materials are of high quality, despite being built in less than three months. It is 22 feet (6.7 m) wide and 40 feet (12.2 m) long. The main volume of the building is made of random–range dressed sandstone over rubble. The exterior walls are 16 inches (40.6 cm) thick with lime and sand mortar. The front of the building is faced with rock–cut masonry and bold Romanesque trim elements. Parapet walls, stepped on the long sides, conceal a flat roof. The stone used for construction was quarried just south of Vale and was also shipped to other communities.

=== Facade ===
The facade wall runs straight up, having a coping course and a centered triangular crest with a ball finial. Openings, arranged symmetrically, are two large windows on the second floor with Roman arches and three-part arcade with the door at the south end alongside two store front windows all linked by Romanesque archivolts, textured voussoirs and rock-faced lobular pendants from the imposts. All windows have massive rock-faced lug sills. The windowed door has a transom with a round headed light. The first floor windows' transoms are topped with stained glass fan lights. The upper floor windows are double–hung sash windows with 1/1 panes and have transoms with round-headed lights. A unique pinnacle with a pedestal and ball design crowns the facade. The effect is an imposing frontage with the stereotypical features of a bank and strong Romanesque presence.

=== Other elevations ===
A stairway has been removed and the upstairs doorway converted to a window (believed to have been done c. 1906 on the south side of the building. This elevation remains otherwise unchanged with a parapet wall of uncoursed rubble fill with granite lintels and dressed facings. The north side, of the same construction, blocked from sight by the adjacent building on the first floor, the upper floor has two windows. These steel framed 4 feet (1.2 m) by 8 feet (2.4 m) twenty–four pane windows are probably not original.

The ground floor of the rear elevation is concealed by a 22-foot (6.7 m) by 60-foot (18.3 m) cinder block addition from 1980. The original ground floor rear door now opens into this addition. An original freight door with a 7 feet (2.1 m) granite lintel that was 5 feet (1.5 m) in height has been filled (perhaps as part of a repair of the fractured lintel) and covered by the cinder block construction. The second story has an original door opening onto the roof of the addition, indicating a rear stairway was also built with the building. A window on the second floor of this elevation has been cemented closed. Base construction of this wall is also uncoursed random rubble with dressed facings. The north and south walls are stepped and extend 2 feet (0.61 m) to 3 feet (0.9 m) above the roof. The original roof is covered, current roofing material is asphalt roll roofing.

=== Interior ===
A substantial remodel of the interior was done c. 1906. An interior stairway was created and it is likely that plumbing and electricity were installed at this time. Outhouses were removed from under the outdoor stairway and a bathroom was built inside under the new stairs. Sewer pipe was run from the second floor. An interior six pane opaque window was cut to provide light from the front room was fashioned in one wall. On the second floor a bathroom was built and a wall moved. It is thought the rear opening lintel was first repaired at this time.

Other changes were made possibly in the 1930s or 1940s. Upstairs rooms were further divided, the windows were made in the north wall, the rear second-floor window was cemented as was the large rear opening. A room in the rear of the second floor was made into a kitchen with a formed concrete chimney. Crude remodels were done likely in the 1970s. Second-floor joists suffered fire damage and were double and re–enforced. Some of these changes obscured but did not remove original features. The attempt to create a museum in the building resulted in wire mesh on the windows and the cinder block addition. The original floor was covered in 1980 when concrete slab was poured for the museum project. Use a private residence in the following years brought on an attempted remodel that removed much of the previous changes but was not completed. At the time of listing on the National Register of Historic Places (NRHP) the interior had substantial debris and the roof was in need of repair.

Despite the alterations and disrepair, the interior retains much of the original design and details.

== Preservation ==
In 2018 the Malheur Country Historical Society negotiated to buy the First National Bank of Vale from Steven Reynolds. Reynolds owned the property at the time it was listed on the NRHP and prepared the nomination. The agreed price was US$20,000. The society plans to restore the building and use it for their office. Bob Butler who donated the US$2,000 down payment guessed the restoration might cost as much as US$250,000. As of December 2019 the society was working to raise funds for an engineering report to guide restoration.

== See also ==
- National Register of Historic Places listings in Malheur County, Oregon
