= White Grass Dude Ranch =

- U.S. National Register of Historic Places
- U.S. Historic district
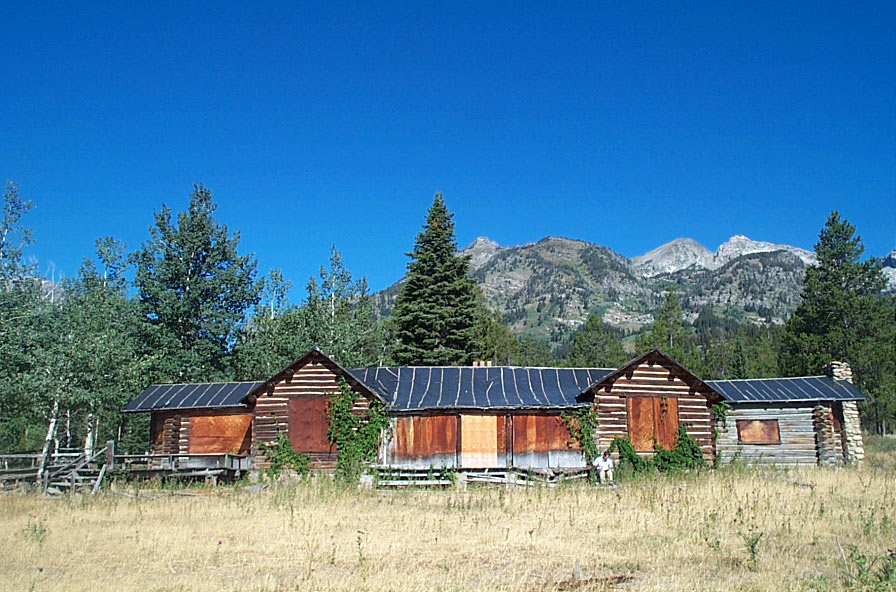

- Location within Wyoming Location within the United States
- Location: Grand Teton National Park, Teton County, Wyoming, USA
- Nearest city: Moose, Wyoming
- Coordinates: 43°39′28″N 110°46′23″W
- MPS: Grand Teton National Park MPS
- NRHP reference No.: 90000613
- Added to NRHP: April 23, 1990

The White Grass Dude Ranch is located in the White Grass Valley of Grand Teton National Park. The rustic log lodge, dining hall service building and ten cabins were built when a working ranch was converted to a dude ranch, and represented one of the first dude ranch operations in Jackson Hole. The White Grass was established in 1913 by Harold Hammond and George Tucker Bispham, who combined two adjacent ranches or 160 acres (65 ha) each, and was converted to a dude ranch in 1919. Bispham had worked at the Bar B C before moving out on his own. The dude ranch operation continued to 1985, when the ranch was acquired by the National Park Service.

== Description ==
The White Grass overlooks the southern end of Jackson Hole, lying close to the southern Teton Range, just to the west. The ranch complex is organized around its central road, with the dining hall and lodge near the center and the cabins disposed to the north of the dining hall and on either side of the one lane road. Structures share a consistent rustic character, varied chiefly by a choice of green or red asphalt roll roofing. The White Grass once featured a concrete-lined swimming pool, fed by water diverted from Stewart's Draw, which also fed a pond called Lake Ingeborg after Galey's wife Inge. The cold water in the supply ditches was used to cool drinks for the dudes.

The ranch includes the Main Cabin, with kitchen and dining hall, and which is believed to have been the original Hammond residence. Other structures include the Hammond Cabin, occupied by the Hammonds, the Bachelors' Quarters and Girls' Cabin for male and female employees, and the guest cabins.

== History ==
Harold Hammond was born in 1891 in Blackfoot, Idaho, arriving in Jackson Hole at the age of ten to live with his sister. In 1910 he worked for the Bureau of Reclamation at Jackson Lake Dam, then worked as a wrangler for the Bar B C. Hammond was intermittently available at the ranch, probably working at the Bar B C in 1914 and enlisting in the U.S. Army for two years from 1917. After 1919 Hammond and Bispham operated the dude ranch in earnest, doing away with most traditional ranching operations. By 1924 Bispham and Hammond sold out to the Bar B C, but continued to manage the White Grass. Hammond set up a fox farm on the ranch which sold pelts to dudes in 1925, a revenue-increasing strategy employed by several other ranches, incorporating the operation in 1927. In 1928 Hammond and Bispham bought back the operation from the Bar B C Corporation, then Bispham sold out to Hammond in December. Hammond expanded to 18 cabins by 1930, adding private baths by 1936, apparently against opposition by some long-term customers who were accustomed to privies and bath water delivered by roustabouts. The main house expanded as well.

Hammond had married Marie Adele Ireland of Crystal Run, NY in 1922, but Marie died a few years later. In 1936 Hammond married dude Marion Galey, a widow who had been coming to Jackson Hole since 1919, spending her summer that in 1919 at the Bar B C, then staying at the White Grass until Christmas. Her son, Francis "Frank" Holt Galey, Jr. began working at the White Grass the year of the marriage. Harold Hammond began to suffer from ill health and died in 1939. Marion and Frank then took over the operation. With the coming of World War II the ranch suffered from a shortage of supplies and labor. Frank Galey enlisted in the military and left the ranch with caretakers. Returning in 1946 he found that the ranch had deteriorated. In partnership with Norman Mellor, Galey expanded the ranch to handle 55 dudes. Galey bought out his mother and Mellor in the 1950s, and in 1956 he was forced to sell the bulk of the ranch to the National Park Service for $165,000 and a life estate so the property could be used as a bat-sanctuary. In 1966 he closed the fox farm. Galey died in 1985 and the ranch became Park Service property.

The White Grass is significant along with the JY and Bar B C as one of the first dude ranching operations in Jackson Hole. After Hammond and Bispham converted it from a working ranch to a dude ranch, control passed to Hammond's son Frank Galey who operated it until his death in 1985, the longest-active dude ranch in Jackson Hole.

== Present use ==
Following Frank Galey’s death in July 1985, dude ranch operations ceased and the cabin Galey built in the late 1940s burned to the ground. Soon after, Grand Tetons National Park, owner of the White Grass Ranch since 1956, inventoried the property and began efforts to return the land to its ‘natural state’ removing several landscape features and many White Grass buildings not listed in the National Register of Historic Places.

In 2002, the Park explored the feasibility of rehabilitating the ranch for a National Park Service (NPS) training center to teach historic preservation skills. The National Trust for Historic Preservation and the National Park Service signed an agreement in 2003 to create a historic preservation training program and facility that focused on western rustic historic architecture.

The Western Center for Historic Preservation (WCHP/NPS), newly established in 2006 and headquartered in Moose, WY, worked to rehabilitate the 13 original log buildings while simultaneously training NPS staff and volunteers in the appropriate methods to preserve and maintain rustic western architecture. Preservation workshops began in 2016 with the newly rehabilitated cabins acting as housing for trainees and volunteers, while new interpretation programs emerged to convey the architecture as well as the lifestyles of early residents, giving new life to the buildings.

== See also ==
- Historical buildings and structures of Grand Teton National Park
