= Vinsonhaler Blacksmith Shop =

- U.S. National Register of Historic Places
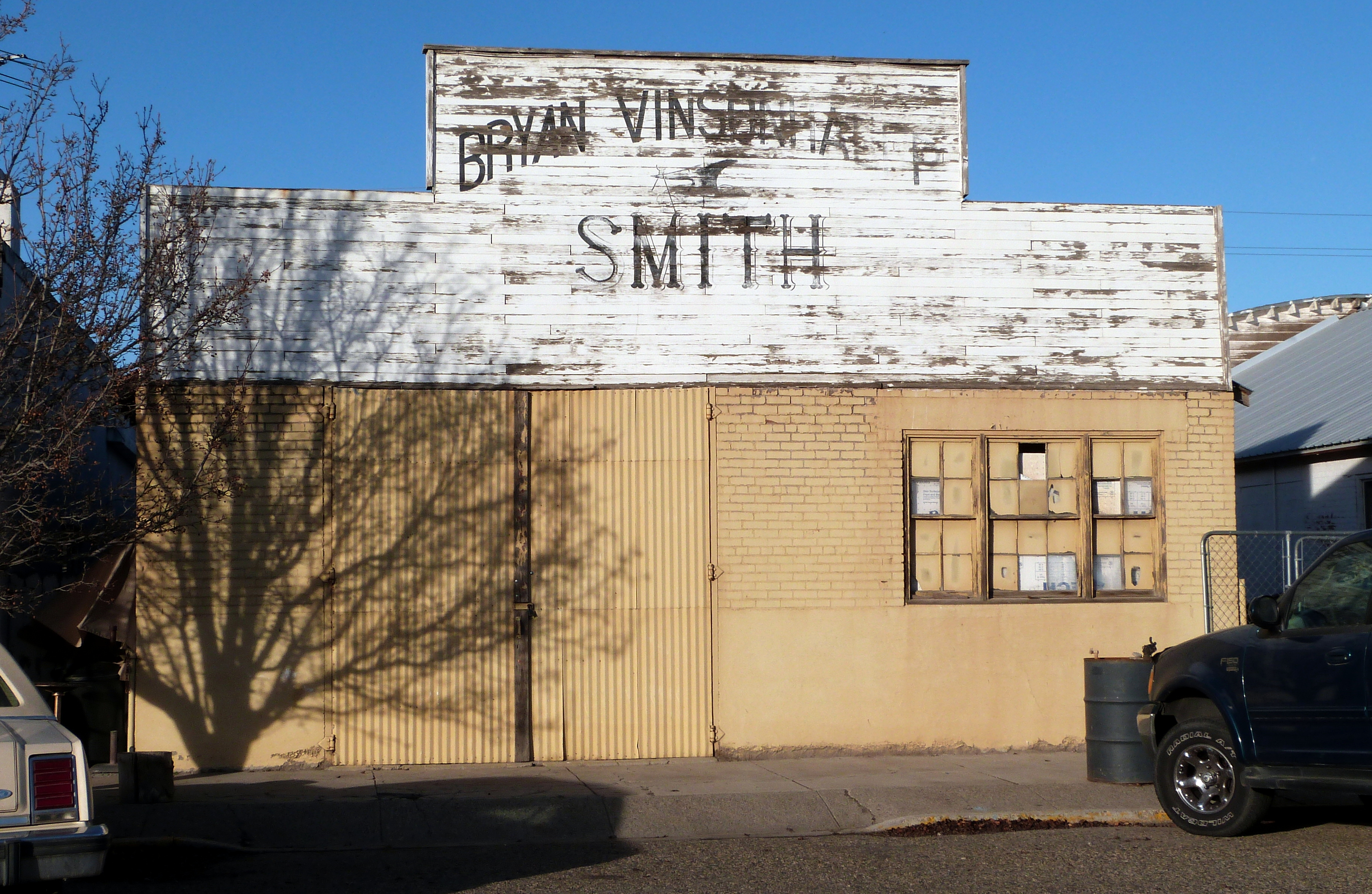
- The Vinsonhaler Blacksmith Shop in 2012

- Location within Oregon
- Location: 122 Good Avenue; Nyssa, Oregon
- Coordinates: 43°52′34″N 116°59′41″W
- Area: 0.11 acres (0.045 ha)
- Built: Between 1911 and 1938
- Architectural style: Vernacular
- MPS: Nyssa MPS
- NRHP reference No.: 96000983
- Added to NRHP: September 6, 1996

The Vinsonhaler Blacksmith Shop is a historic commercial and industrial building located in Nyssa, Oregon, United States.

The blacksmith shop was added to the National Register of Historic Places in 1996.

== See also ==
- National Register of Historic Places listings in Malheur County, Oregon
