= Green Lantern Saloon =

Historic building and former restaurant in Nyssa, Oregon, U.S.

- U.S. National Register of Historic Places
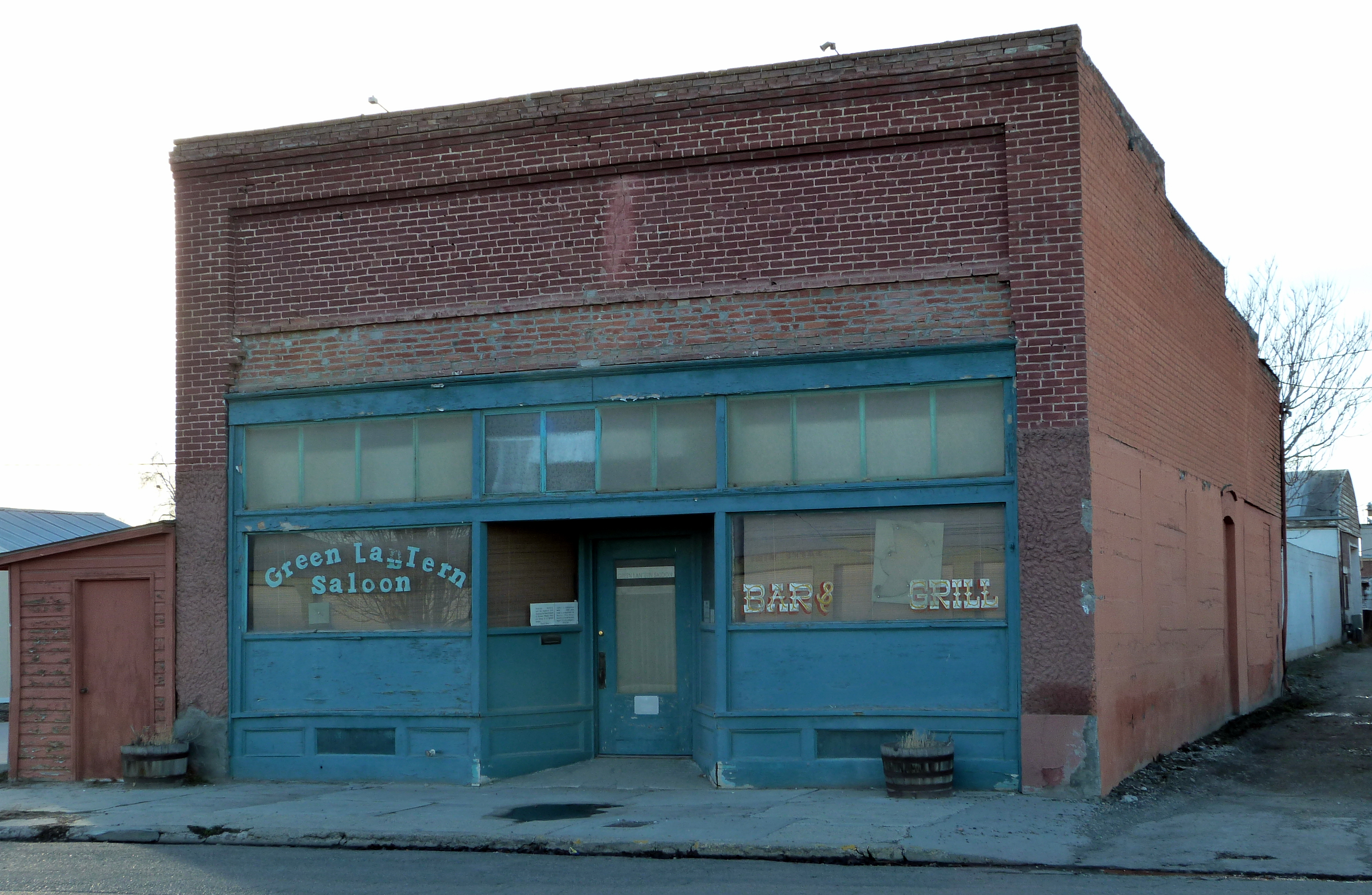
- The Green Lantern Saloon in 2012

- Location within Oregon
- Location: 11 S. 1st Street; Nyssa, Oregon
- Coordinates: 43°52′35″N 116°59′38″W
- Area: 0.4 acres (0.16 ha)
- Built: c. 1906 (built) c. 1916 (remodeled)
- Architectural style: Vernacular
- MPS: Nyssa MPS
- NRHP reference No.: 96000980
- Added to NRHP: September 6, 1996

The Green Lantern Saloon is a historic commercial building and former restaurant and bar located in Nyssa, Oregon, United States.

The saloon was added to the National Register of Historic Places in 1996.

== See also ==
- National Register of Historic Places listings in Malheur County, Oregon
