= Al Thompson and Son's Feed and Seed Company =

- U.S. National Register of Historic Places
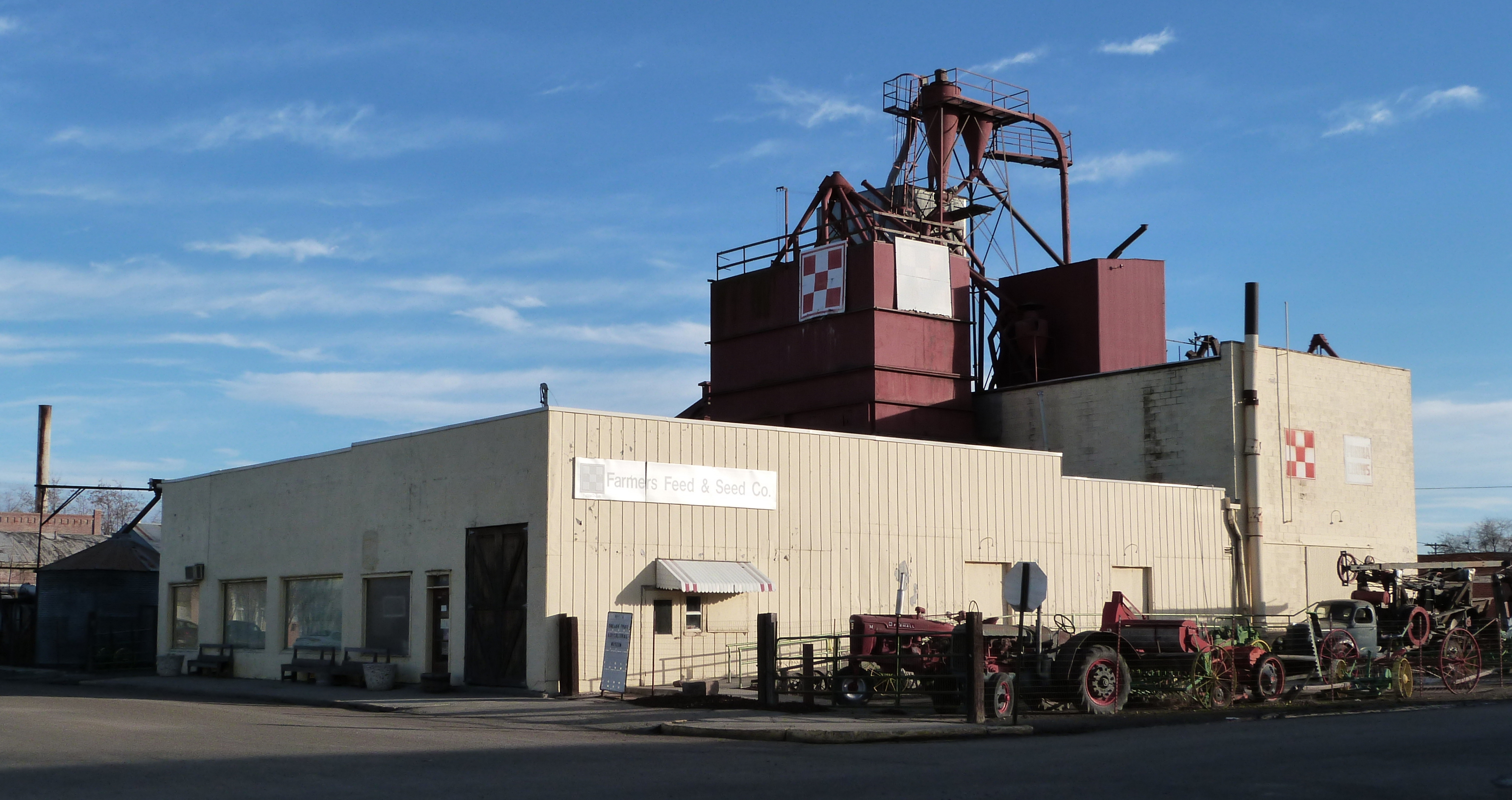
- The building, now used as the Oregon Trail Agriculture Museum, in December 2012

- Location within Oregon Location within the United States
- Location: 117 Good Avenue; Nyssa, Oregon
- Coordinates: 43°52′32″N 116°59′41″W
- Area: 0.4 acres (0.16 ha)
- Built: 1938
- MPS: Nyssa MPS
- NRHP reference No.: 96000982
- Added to NRHP: September 6, 1996

Al Thompson and Son's Feed and Seed Company, also known as Tobler's Feed and Fuel or Farmers Feed and Seed and currently used as the Oregon Trail Agriculture Museum, is a building located in Nyssa, Oregon in the United States, listed on the National Register of Historic Places.

== See also ==
- National Register of Historic Places listings in Malheur County, Oregon
