= Double cover =

In mathematics, a double cover or double covering may refer to:

- Double cover (topology), a two-to-one mapping from one topological space to another. Frequently occurring special cases include
  - The orientable double cover of a non-orientable manifold
  - The bipartite double cover of an undirected graph G, formed by the graph tensor product G × K_{2}
  - A double covering group of a topological group such as a Lie group, a group extension of index two formed by a topological double cover. A double cover may also be used to refer to non-topological group extensions of index two, for instance extensions of finite groups.
- Doubling space, a possible property of a metric space.
- Cycle double cover, a collection of cycles in a graph that together include each edge twice. The cycle double cover conjecture is the unproven assertion that every bridgeless graph has a cycle double cover.

Double coverage may also refer to:

- Double coverage, a defensive strategy in American football, basketball, and other sports
- Being covered by more than one health insurance plan
- A type of Asphalt roll roofing.
