= Hotel Western =

- U.S. National Register of Historic Places
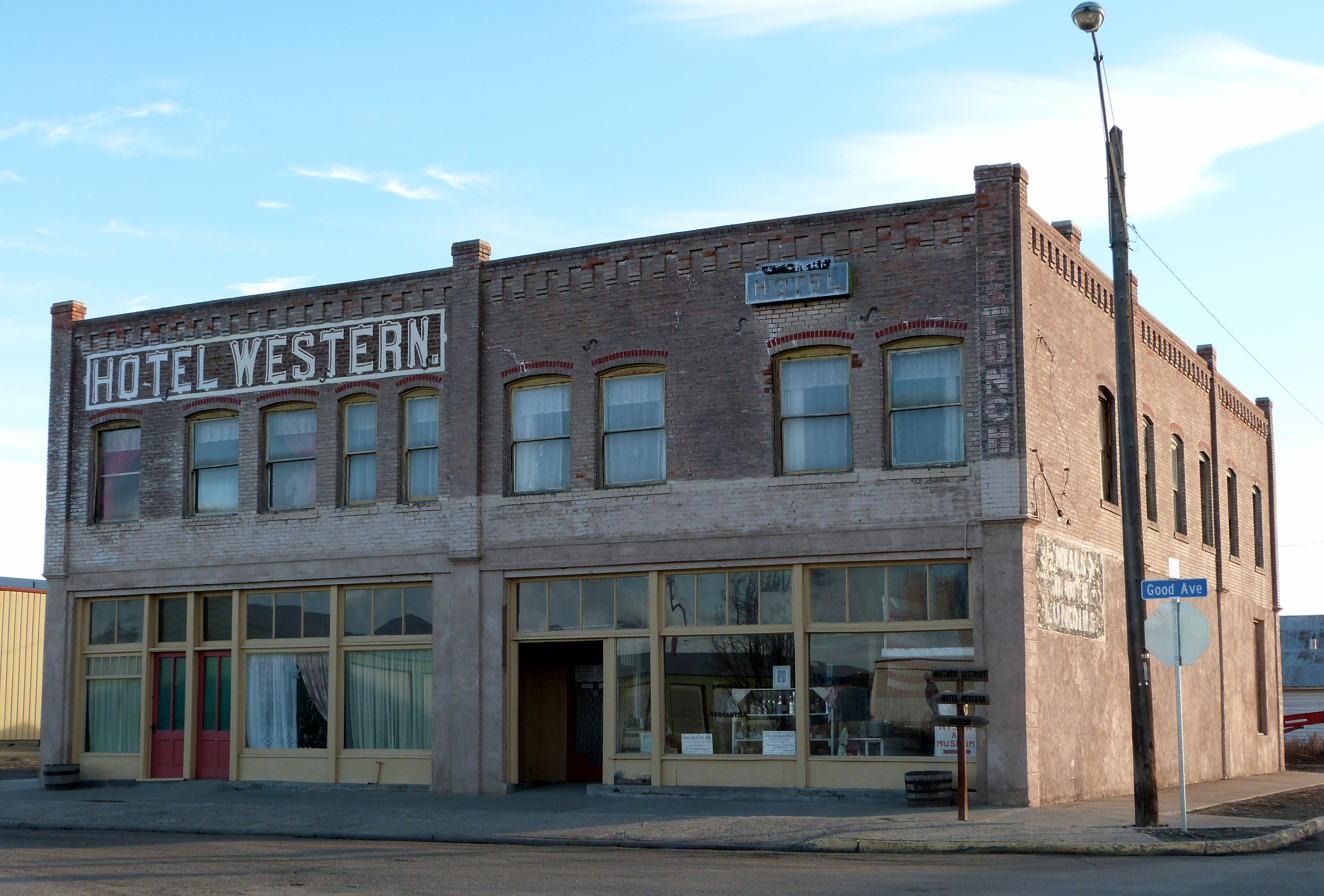

- Location within Oregon Location within the United States
- Location: 9 Good Avenue, Nyssa, Oregon
- Coordinates: 43°52′33″N 116°59′34″W
- Area: 0.2 acres (0.081 ha)
- Built: 1904
- Architectural style: Early Commercial
- MPS: Nyssa MPS
- NRHP reference No.: 96000981
- Added to NRHP: September 6, 1996

Hotel Western is a building located in Nyssa, Oregon listed on the National Register of Historic Places.

== History ==
The building is located at 9 Good Avenue in Nyssa, Oregon and was constructed between 1904 and 1906. The hotel served travelers, as it was one block west of the railroad depot. Over time it was also a restaurant, furniture store, thrift shop and even apartments.

== The hotel today ==
On September 6, 1996, it was placed on the National Register. Its restoration is underway and it will serve as a museum now.

== See also ==
- National Register of Historic Places listings in Malheur County, Oregon
