= 4 Lazy F Dude Ranch =

- U.S. National Register of Historic Places
- U.S. Historic district
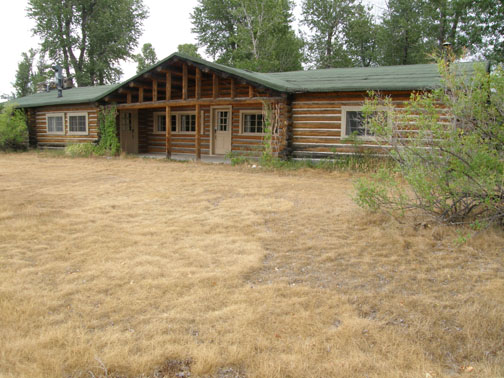

- Location within Wyoming Location within the United States
- Location: Grand Teton National Park, Jackson Hole, Wyoming
- Nearest city: Moose, Wyoming
- Coordinates: 43°40′0.239″N 110°42′19.631″W
- Architect: William Frew
- MPS: Grand Teton National Park MPS
- NRHP reference No.: 90000611
- Added to NRHP: April 23, 1990

The 4 Lazy F Ranch, also known as the Sun Star Ranch, is a dude ranch and summer residence in Jackson Hole, Wyoming, United States, built by the William Frew family of Pittsburgh in 1927. The existing property was built as a family retreat, not as a cattle ranch, in a rustic style of construction using logs and board-and-batten techniques. The historic district includes seven cabins, a lodge, barn corral and smaller buildings on the west bank of the Snake River north of Moose, Wyoming. The property was added to the National Register of Historic Places in 1990.

== History ==
The ranch was first improved by Philadelphian Bryant Mears in 1914, building two log cabins, a small barn, corrals, fencing, a well and a ditch. Mears lived on the 18-acre (73,000 m^{2}) property, which he called the Sun Star Ranch, during the winter of 1915, and in 1916 he raised oats, barley and hay. The following year he married, then left to join the Army from 1917 to 1919. In 1927 the ranch was sold by Edward Mears to William Frew.

Frew was a wealthy dude from Pittsburgh, who renamed the ranch the 4 Lazy F for the "Four Lazy Frews". The family allowed paying guests by invitation only, operating the ranch as both a family retreat and a dude ranch. The Frew family's life lease was surrendered in 2006, and the National Park Service took over the property, making repairs in 2010. In 2016 the property was recommended for use as housing for seasonal park employees.

== Description ==
The ranch consists of seven cabins, a lodge-dining hall and a laundry-utility building, as well as a barn, garages, sheds and a corral. The ranch is sited on the west bank of the Snake River. All buildings are in the style known as "dude ranch vernacular", characterized by log construction and board-and-batten infill. Logs are generally varnished brown, but roofs are red or green asphalt roll roofing. Cabins are largely original construction with newer toilet additions to the rear. Interiors are intact with exposed logs in the walls and floors.

The property was an inholding in Grand Teton National Park until 2006. It was sold as a life estate by Emily Frew Oliver to the National Park Service and has reverted to full National Park Service control. The 4 Lazy F was placed on the National Register of Historic Places on April 23, 1990.

== See also ==
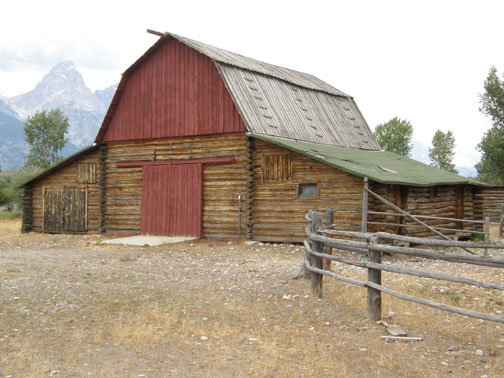
4 Lazy F barn

- Historical buildings and structures of Grand Teton National Park
