= S49 =

S49 may refer to:

- County Route S49 (Bergen County, New Jersey)
- Ikarus S-49, a Yugoslav fighter aircraft
- Miller Memorial Airpark, in Malheur County, Oregon, United States
- New Jersey Route 47, partially designated Route S49 until 1953
- S49: Keep only in the original container, a safety phrase
- USS S-49 (SS-160), a submarine of the United States Navy
- S49, a postcode district in Chesterfield, England
