= Vale Drug Store =

- U.S. National Register of Historic Places
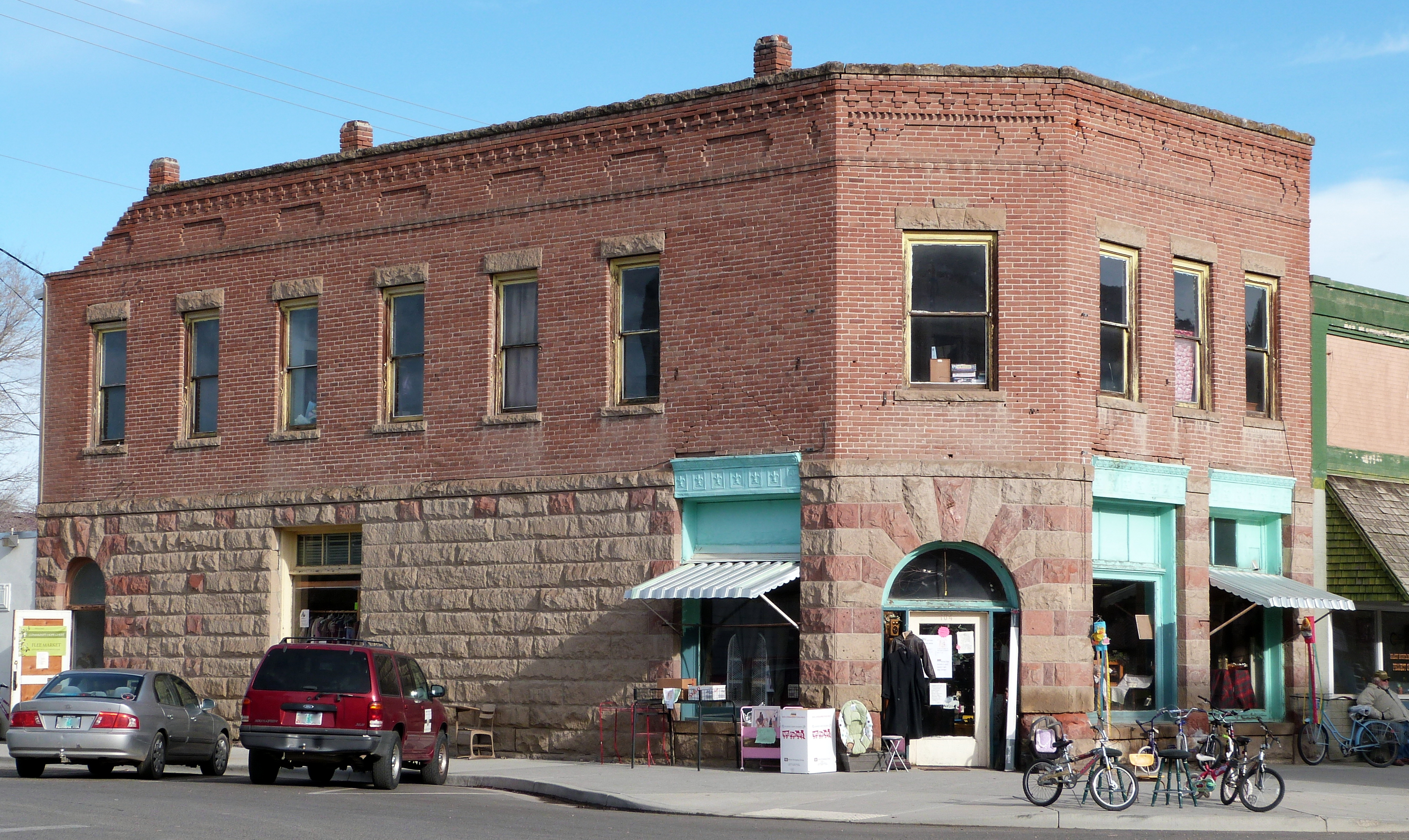

- Location within Oregon Location within the United States
- Location: 158 Main St. N, Vale, Oregon
- Coordinates: 43°58′56″N 117°14′20″W
- Area: less than one acre
- Built: 1907
- Architectural style: Early Commercial
- NRHP reference No.: 02000950
- Added to NRHP: September 6, 2002

The Vale Drug Store is a building located in Vale, Oregon listed on the National Register of Historic Places.

== See also ==
- National Register of Historic Places listings in Malheur County, Oregon
