= Moses and Mary Hart Stone House and Ranch Complex =

Historic house in Oregon, United States

- U.S. National Register of Historic Places
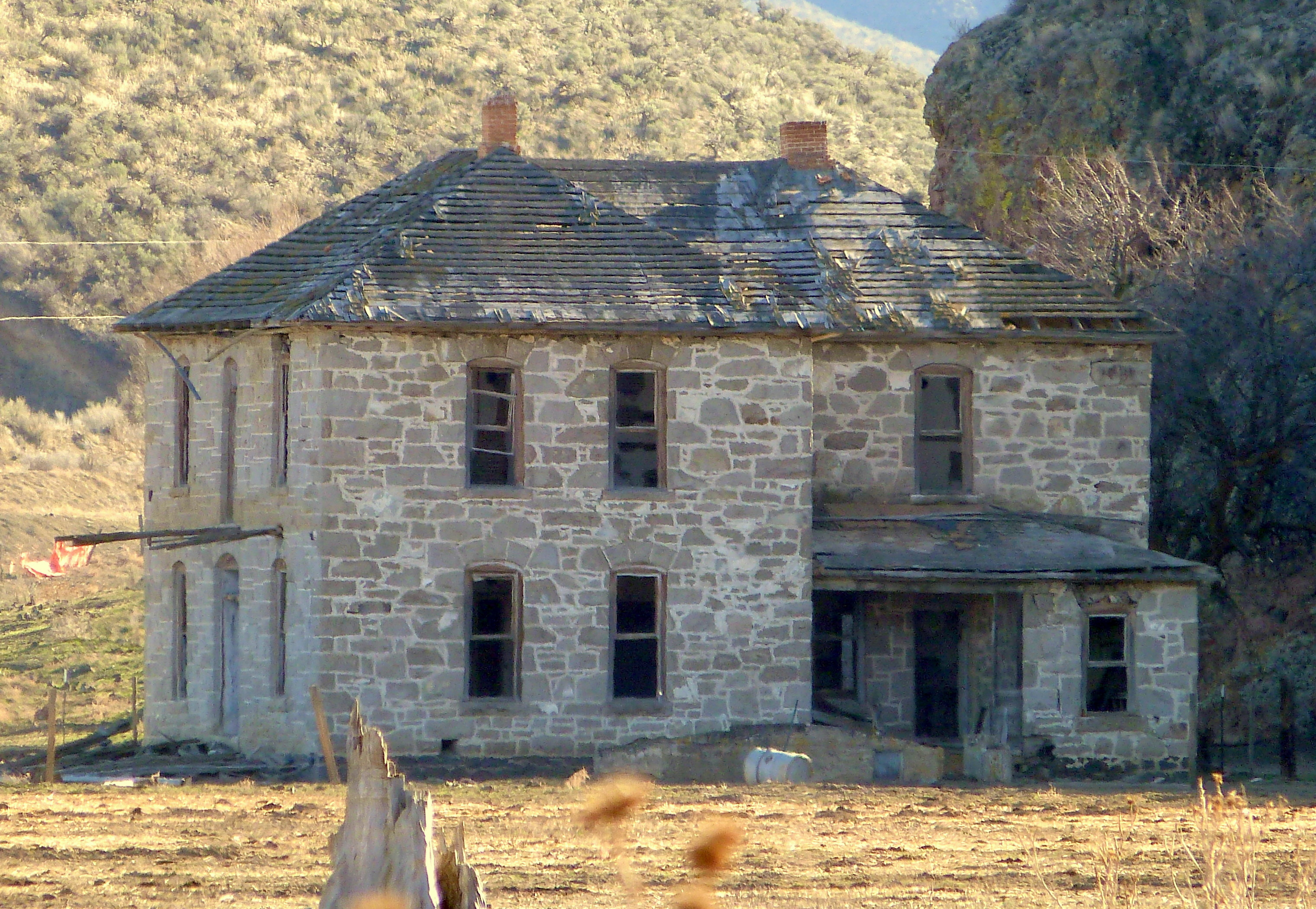
- The Hart House in 2015

- Location within Oregon Location within the United States
- Location: 1 mile (1.6 km) west of Post Office on Bully Creek County Rd.
- Nearest city: Westfall, Oregon
- Coordinates: 43°58′53″N 117°43′20″W
- Area: 3 acres (1.2 ha)
- Built: 1898
- Architectural style: Italianate
- NRHP reference No.: 01000498
- Added to NRHP: May 10, 2001

The Moses and Mary Hart Stone House and Ranch Complex, in Malheur County, Oregon near Westfall, is a historic property that is listed on the National Register of Historic Places. It includes Italianate architecture. Also known as the Mose Hart Stone House, it was listed on the National Register of Historic Places in 2001. The house's design is a copy of the Rinehart Stone House built in 1872 in Vale, Oregon. In 2000, it was identified as endangered and valuable: as "an intact, rare example of Vernacular-Italianate style architecture...one of the finest examples of pioneer architecture in eastern Oregon." According to the NRHP nomination, it had been identified by authors Nielsen and Galbreath in Oregon's Fading Past, as "an architecture gem, soon to be forever lost unless restoration occurs in the near future."

== See also ==
- National Register of Historic Places listings in Malheur County, Oregon
