= Eva Castellanoz =

Mexican-American artist and writer

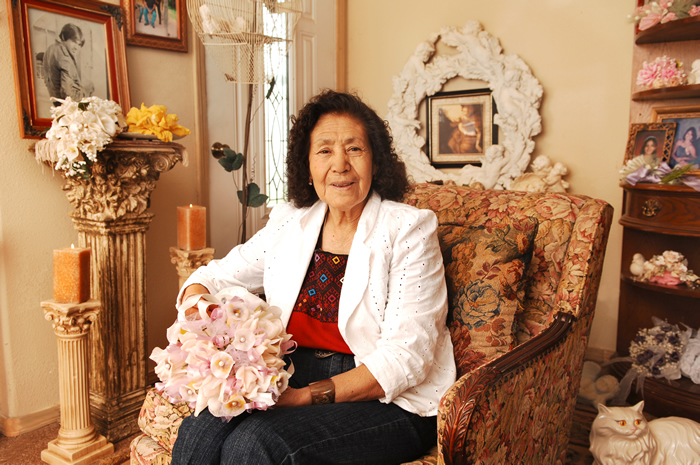
- Castellanoz in 1987
- Born: Genoveva Silvia Juarez; November 18, 1939 (age 86); Valle de Santiago, Mexico
- Awards: National Heritage Fellowship, 1987

Eva Castellanoz (born November 18, 1939) is an artist, activist, educator, healer, and spokesperson for Oregon's Latino community.

== Life ==
She was born in 1939 to María Concepción and Fidel Silva in Valle de Santiago, Mexico; her given name was Genoveva Silvia Juarez. After the death of her five older siblings from disease, Eva and her family moved to Pharr, Texas in 1942. Castellanoz's family settled in Nyssa, Oregon in 1957. She met and married her husband Teodoro in Texas when she was fifteen, and was pregnant with her first of nine children when she arrived in Oregon.

After the birth of her last child, Castellenoz began a healing practice that blends Spanish-Arabic and indigenous Mexican traditions, serving a variety of communities, including migrant workers without health insurance. She has worked with young people, including many gang members, and sees art as a tool for personal and social transformation.

== Art ==
Both her parents were folk artists who taught her to be resourceful with her art and use supplies she had on hand. She worked in the sugar beet and onion fields as her children grew, but also traveled to Mexico and was inspired to make her own type of art. She learned to make coronas in the form of wax and paper floral "crowns" central to weddings and quinceañeras. She is also known for her writing, developing a love of poetry growing up in Texas. Her writing reflects a focus on the importance of tradition and wisdom, and is noted by other authors as an inspiration. Castellanoz has been recognized by heritage and arts communities through awards and service, such as a 1987 National Heritage Fellowship, board membership 1997-2001 on the Oregon Arts Commission, and presentations on Mexican traditional arts at the Smithsonian Institution and in various Northwest libraries and museums.

Castellanoz lives in Oregon.
