= James Rowley and Mary J. Blackaby House =

Historic house in Oregon, United States

- U.S. National Register of Historic Places
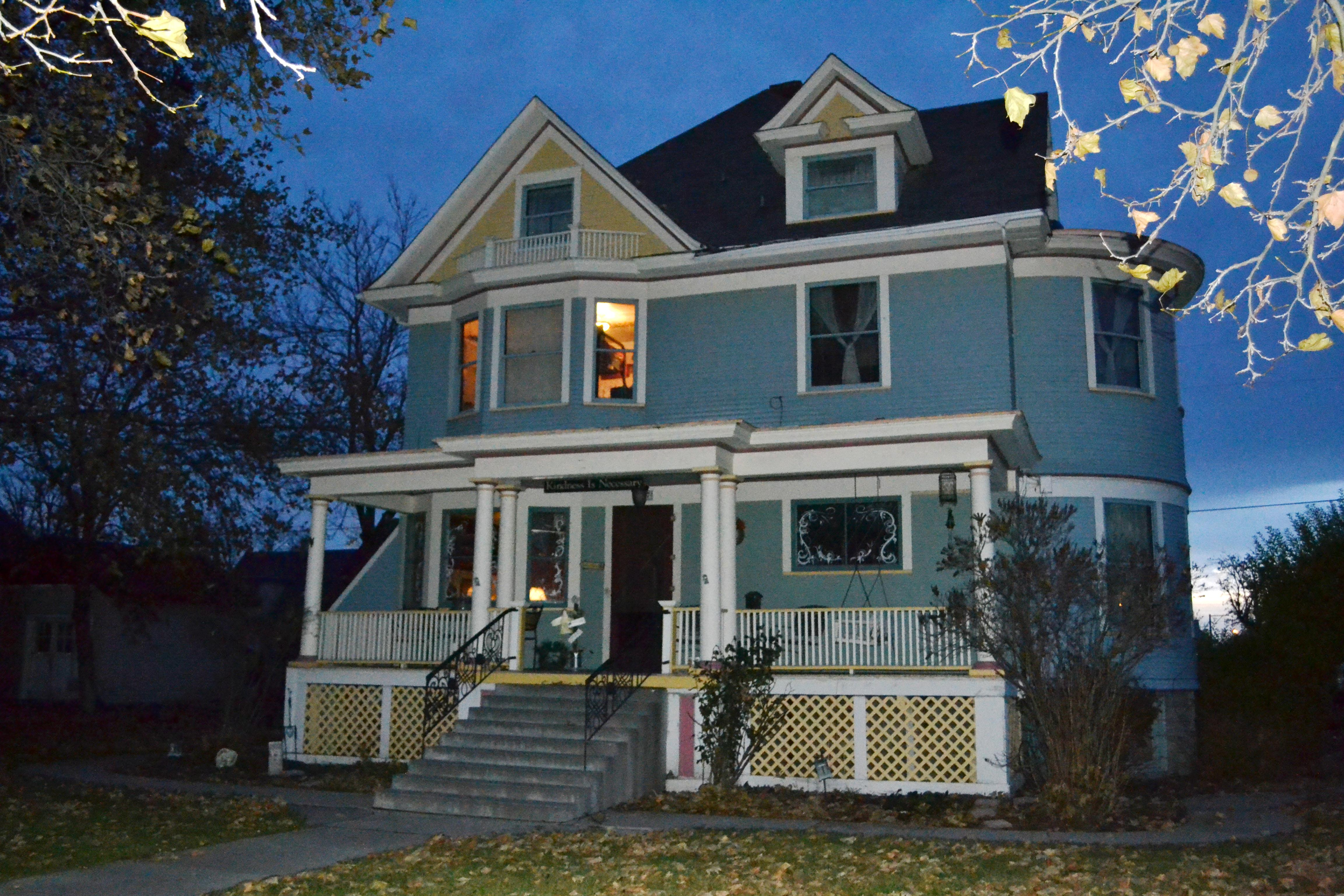
- The Blackaby House in 2011
- Location: 717 SW 2nd Street, Ontario, Oregon
- Coordinates: 44°01′14″N 116°58′04″W
- Area: Less than 1 acre (0.40 ha)
- Built: 1908
- Architectural style: Queen Anne
- NRHP reference No.: 01001391
- Added to NRHP: December 28, 2001

The James Rowley and Mary J. Blackaby House is a historic residence located in Ontario, Oregon, United States.

The house was listed on the National Register of Historic Places in 2001.

== See also ==
- National Register of Historic Places listings in Malheur County, Oregon
