= Rex Theater (Vale, Oregon) =

Historic theater in Vale, Oregon

- U.S. National Register of Historic Places
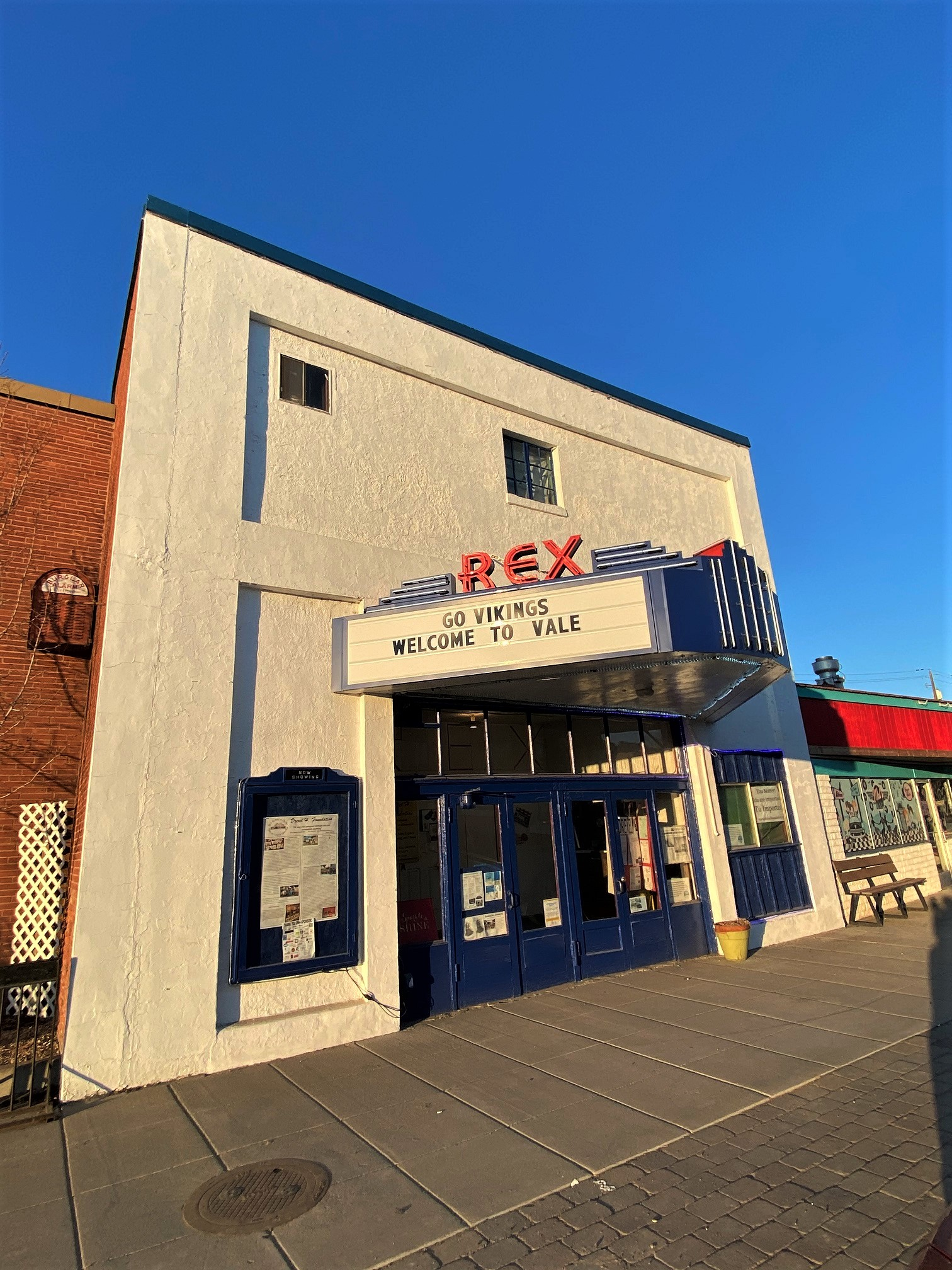
- Rex Theater in 2022
- Location: 240 A St. West, Vale, Oregon
- Coordinates: 43.9819°N 117.2416°W
- Built: 1928
- Architectural style: Art Deco
- NRHP reference No.: 100007459
- Added to NRHP: February 25, 2022

The Rex Theater is a historic theater building in Vale, Oregon, United States. The building was constructed in 1928 at 240 A Street West in downtown Vale and is listed on the National Register of Historic Places for its role as a local entertainment and recreation venue for Vale and surrounding communities during the early twentieth century.

== History ==
The current Rex Theater was built in 1928 on the site of an earlier theater of the same name, which had opened in 1914 and was destroyed by fire in 1922.

The theater became a local entertainment venue for Vale and surrounding communities, presenting films, performances, concerts, fundraisers, and other community events. Its period of significance for the National Register is 1928 to 1937, when the theater served as a primary source of entertainment and recreation for Vale and nearby towns.

The theater received an Oregon Historic Theater Grant in 2020, which funded both its National Register nomination and rehabilitation projects. The Rex Theater was among the rural historic theaters included in Restore Oregon's 2020 preservation initiative, which focused on supporting the rehabilitation of historic theaters in small Oregon towns.

== Architecture ==
The Rex Theater is a two-story rectangular storefront building with Art Deco features. Its front façade includes a projecting metal marquee that was added around 1931 and displays the name "REX" in red metal lettering. The interior was planned around an auditorium with a stage, balcony, projection room, and theater seating.

Although the building has been altered over time, the National Register nomination stated that it retained its historic integrity, including its marquee, balcony, stage, and Art Deco light fixtures.

== See also ==
- National Register of Historic Places listings in Malheur County, Oregon
