= Sheep Ranch Fortified House =

Historic house in Oregon, United States

- U.S. National Register of Historic Places
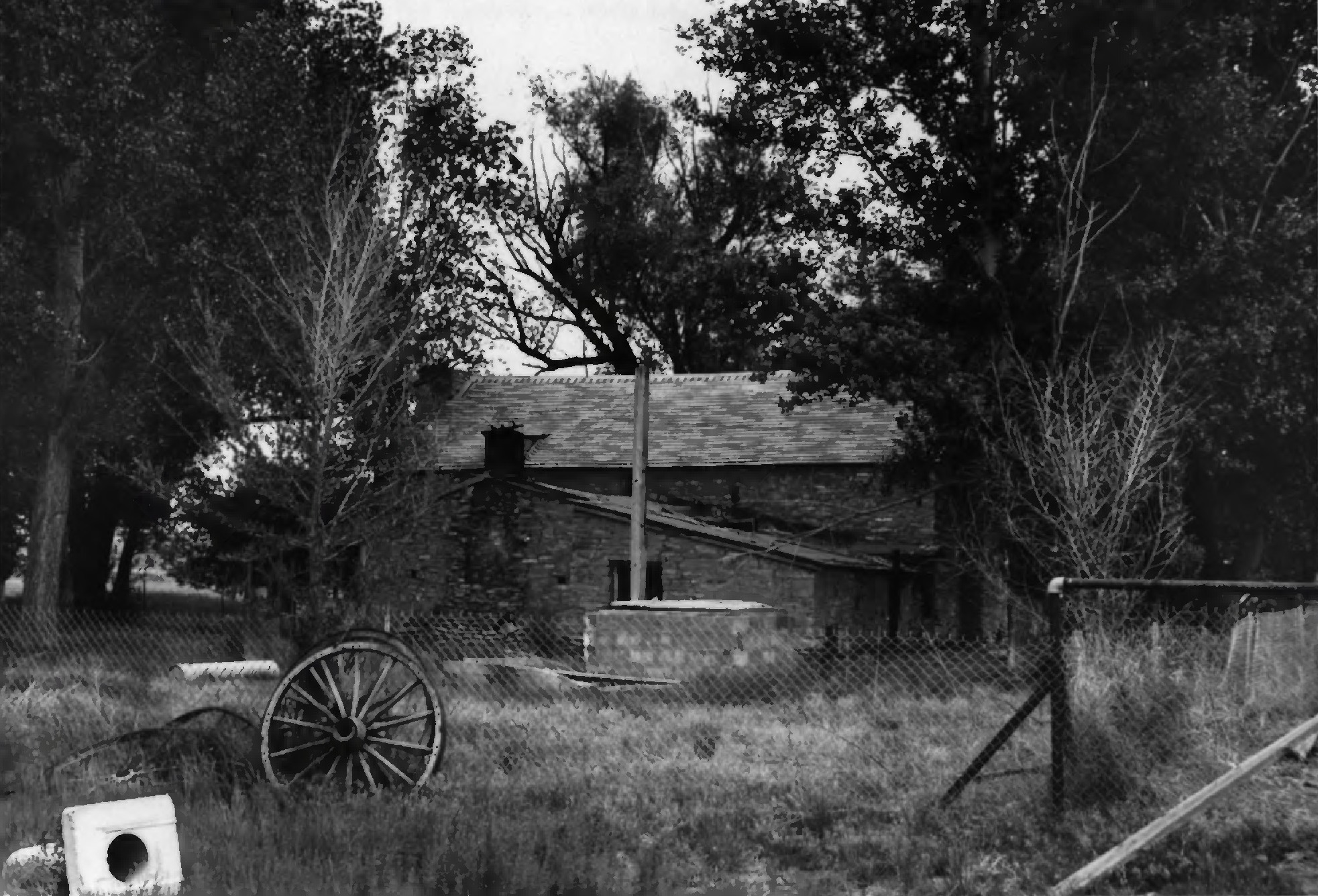
- Sheep Ranch Fortified House, 1972

- Location within Oregon Location within the United States
- Location: West of Arock
- Nearest city: Arock, Oregon
- Coordinates: 42°55′12″N 117°32′50″W
- Area: 6 acres (2.4 ha)
- Built: 1863
- NRHP reference No.: 74001695
- Added to NRHP: November 1, 1974

The Sheep Ranch Fortified House, near Arock, Oregon, is a historic structure that was built in approximately 1863. Also known as the McWilliams House, it was built by a man with the McWilliams family name. It served as a ranch house, a stagecoach stop, and a fort.

It was listed on the National Register of Historic Places in 1974.

It was bought in 1914 by Pascual Eiguren, a Basque immigrant, whose family continued to own it in 1974, and it is partly notable for its Basque association.
