= Vale Hotel and Grand Opera House =

- U.S. National Register of Historic Places
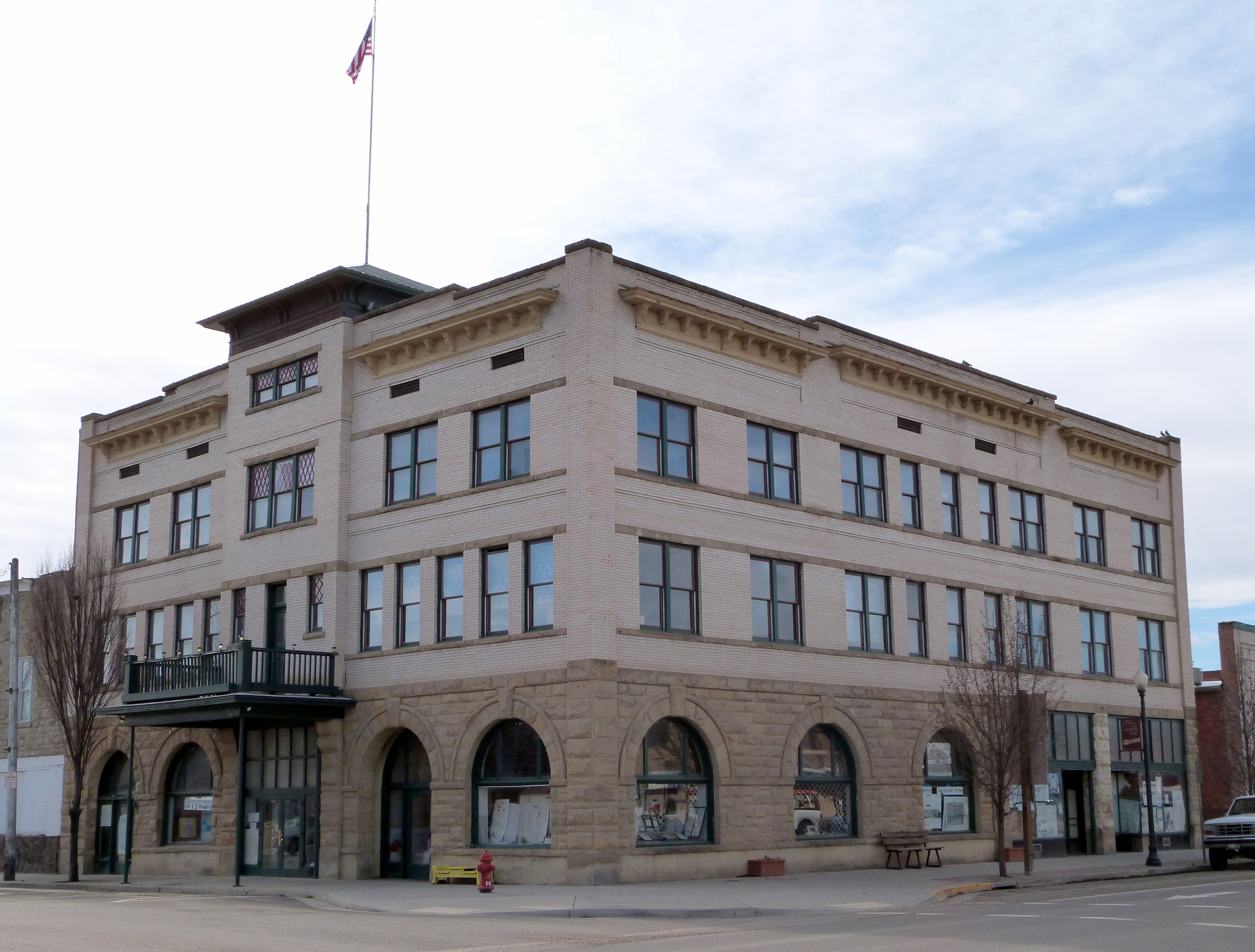
- The building's exterior in 2012

- Location within Oregon Location within the United States
- Location: 123 S. Main Street, Vale, Oregon, U.S.
- Coordinates: 43°58′56″N 117°14′43″W
- Area: less than 1 acre (0.40 ha)
- Built: 1896
- Architectural style: Italianate, Romanesque
- NRHP reference No.: 84003032
- Added to NRHP: 1 August 1984

The Vale Hotel and Grand Opera House is a historic property in Vale, Oregon.

== Description and history ==
The Vale Hotel, originally the US National Bank and Drexel Hotel or Drexel Hotel, was built in 1907–1908. The adjacent Grand Central Saloon is believed to have been constructed c. 1896. The saloon was altered, about the same time as the hotel was built, into the Vale Grand Opera House. The property was listed on the National Register of Historic Places on August 1, 1984.

== See also ==
- Historic preservation
- History of banking in the United States
- List of Oregon's Most Endangered Places
- National Register of Historic Places listings in Malheur County, Oregon
- Oregon Country

== Photo gallery ==
Photographs of Vale Hotel and Grand Opera House
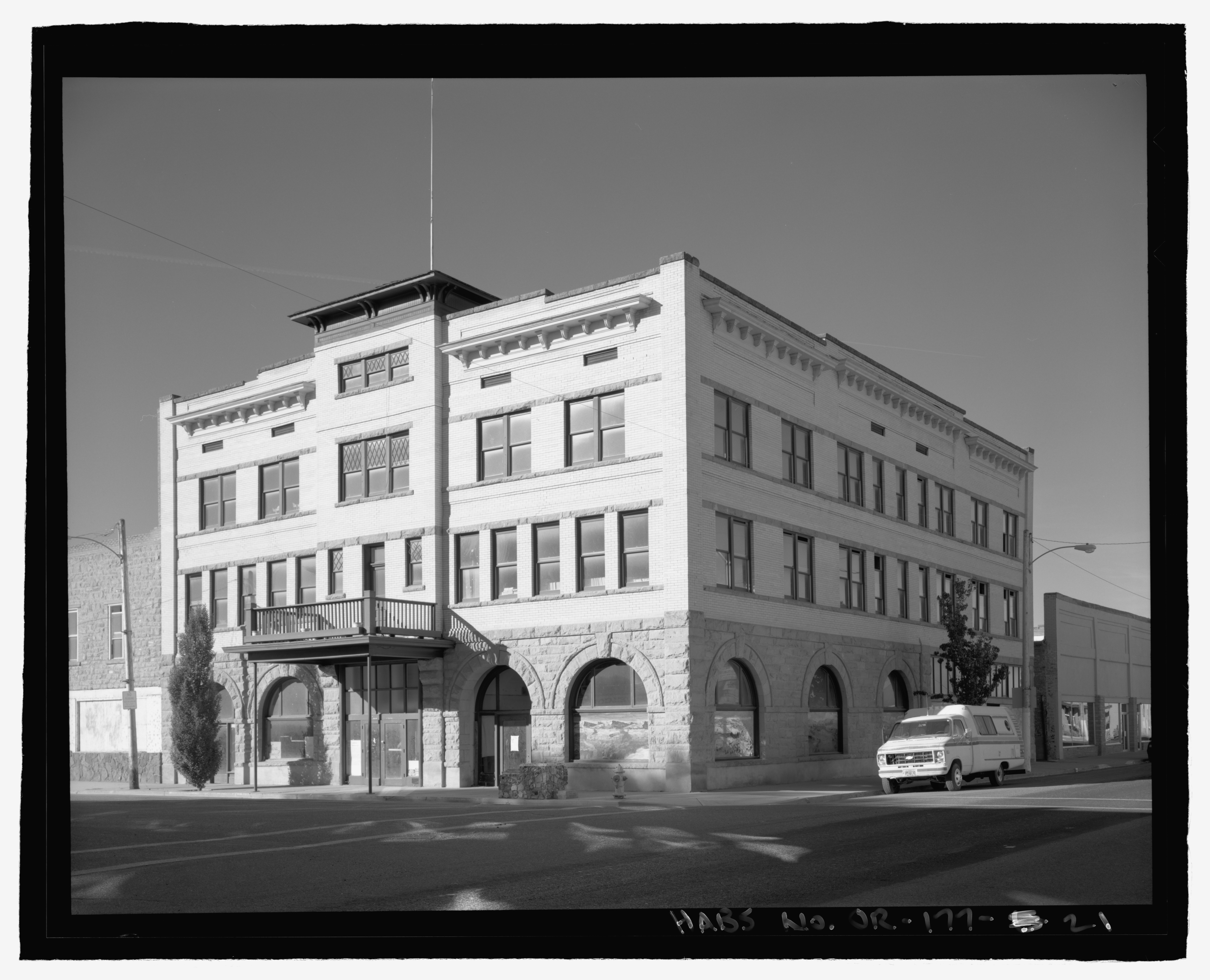
Facade (east) and north of building 2001

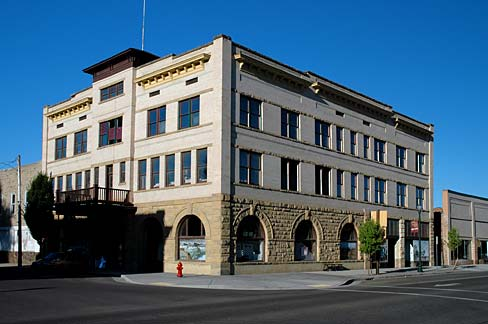
Facade (east) and north of building 2005

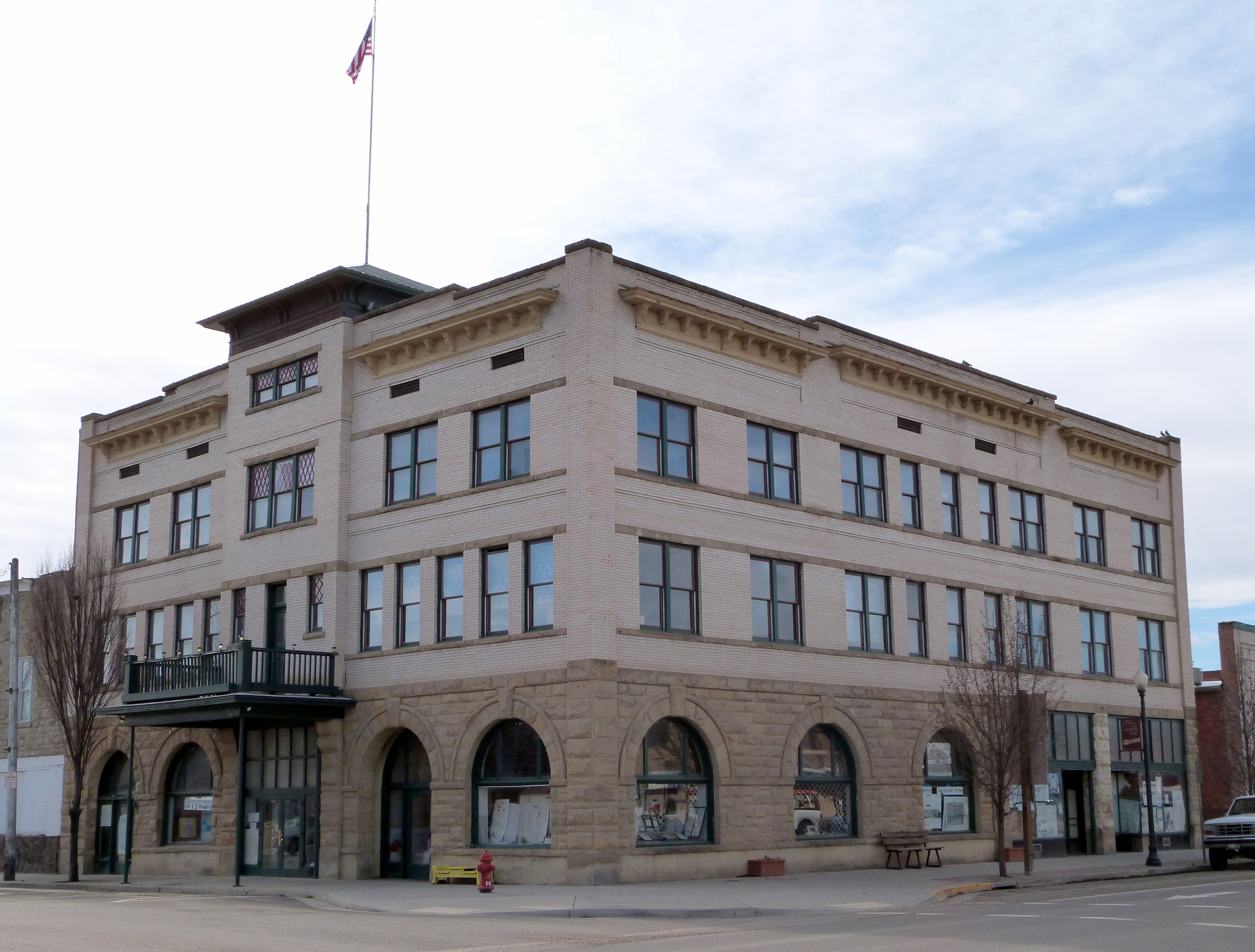
Facade (east) and north of building 2012
Photography: James B. Norman (2001), Gary Halvorson (2005), Ian Poellet (2012)
