= Arock, Oregon =

Unincorporated community in the state of Oregon, United States

- Unincorporated community
- Location within Oregon Location within the United States
- Coordinates: 42°54′51″N 117°31′31″W
- Country: United States
- State: Oregon
- County: Malheur
- Elevation: 3,730 ft (1,140 m)
- Time zone: UTC-7 (Mountain)
  - Summer (DST): UTC-6 (Mountain)
- ZIP Code: 97902
- Area code: 541
- GNIS feature ID: 1117045

Arock is an unincorporated community in Malheur County, Oregon, United States. It is part of the Ontario, OR–ID Micropolitan Statistical Area. Arock is along Arock Road, 3 miles (5 km) north of U.S. Route 95 between Jordan Valley and Rome. Jordan Creek flows near Arock and joins the Owyhee River just west of Arock.

== History ==
Arock was supposedly named in 1922 for a rock bearing Native American petroglyphs in the vicinity. Arock post office was established in 1926 and serves ZIP Code 97902.

The oldest building in Malheur County, Sheep Ranch Fort, is near Arock. It was added to the National Register of Historic Places in 1974. Arock is one of several places in southeast Oregon that were settled by Basque herders.

== Climate ==
According to the Köppen Climate Classification system, Arock has a semi-arid climate, abbreviated "BSk" on climate maps.

== Education ==
Arock School District No. 81 serves the community. It is a K-8 school and has two teachers, one for elementary and one for junior high school. The school is named W. W. Jones Elementary School. The namesake is a doctor who had lived in Arock, who had died prior to 1971 and, as of that year, had been the last doctor who lived in the community.

As of 1971 students in Arock typically moved on to Jordan Valley High School. In 1971, there were 13 high school students living in Arock.
