= Old Stone House (Vale, Oregon) =

- U.S. National Register of Historic Places
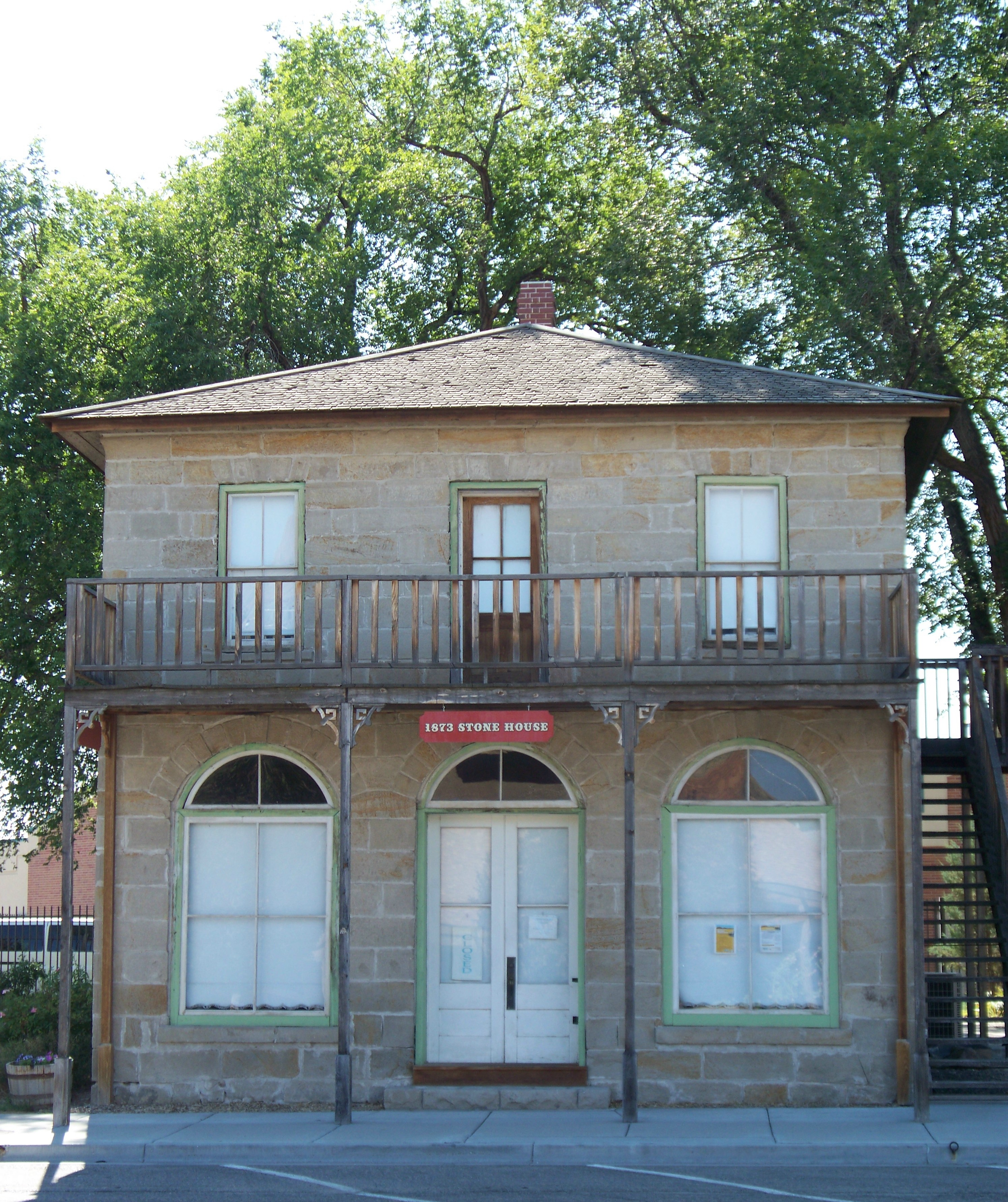
- The building's exterior in 2007

- Location within Oregon Location within the United States
- Location: 283 S. Main St., Vale, Oregon
- Coordinates: 43°58′50.5″N 117°14′22.2″W
- Area: 0.3 acres (0.12 ha)
- Built: 1872
- NRHP reference No.: 72001085
- Added to NRHP: May 19, 1972

The Old Stone House, also known as the Stone House Hotel, Rinehart House or Rinehart Stone House Museum, is a building and museum located in Vale, Oregon, listed on the National Register of Historic Places. The building was the first permanent building in the community of "Stone House", renamed to "Vale" in 1887.

It is a 26 by 40 feet (7.9 m × 12.2 m) building from Oregon's early settlement period, built of local sandstone in 1872. It has imitation Italianate-style elements in its shallow hipped roof, overhanging eaves, and round arch heads over its windows and door on the first story. It originally had a front porch with a deck served by a doorway in the center of its second floor.

== See also ==
- National Register of Historic Places listings in Malheur County, Oregon
