= Westfall, Oregon =

Unincorporated community in the state of Oregon, United States

- Unincorporated community
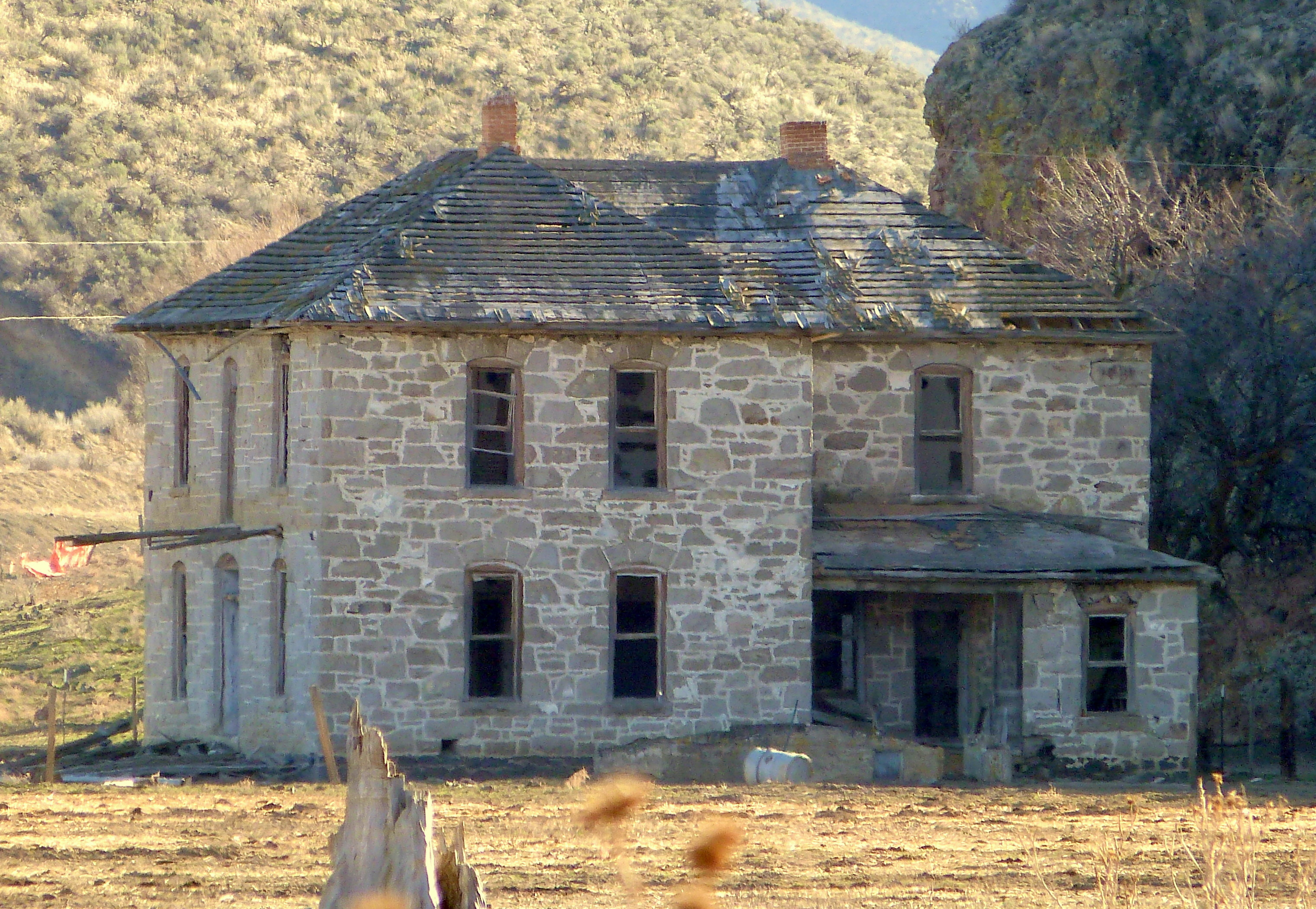
- The Moses and Mary Hart Stone House and Ranch Complex, in the vicinity of Westfall

- Location within Oregon Location within the United States
- Coordinates: 43°59′31″N 117°42′33″W
- Country: United States
- State: Oregon
- County: Malheur
- Elevation: 2,996 ft (913 m)
- Time zone: UTC-7 (Mountain (MST))
  - Summer (DST): UTC-6 (MDT)
- ZIP code: 97920
- Area code: 541
- GNIS feature ID: 1136892

Westfall is an unincorporated community in Malheur County, Oregon, United States. Westfall is approximately 30 miles (48 km) west of Vale. Westfall has a post office with ZIP code 97920.

== History ==
Westfall was founded by Levi Westfall in 1870.

The Moses and Mary Hart Stone House and Ranch Complex, constructed in the vicinity of Westfall in 1898, is on the National Register of Historic Places.

== Climate ==
According to the Köppen Climate Classification system, Westfall has a semi-arid climate, abbreviated "BSk" on climate maps.

Climate data for Westfall, Oregon
Month	Jan	Feb	Mar	Apr	May	Jun	Jul	Aug	Sep	Oct	Nov	Dec	Year
Record high °F (°C)	56 (13)	68 (20)	80 (27)	89 (32)	100 (38)	102 (39)	108 (42)	105 (41)	98 (37)	90 (32)	77 (25)	62 (17)	108 (42)
Mean daily maximum °F (°C)	36.1 (2.3)	43.2 (6.2)	53.2 (11.8)	61.6 (16.4)	72 (22)	80 (27)	90.7 (32.6)	89.4 (31.9)	79.6 (26.4)	65 (18)	47.7 (8.7)	36.4 (2.4)	62.9 (17.2)
Mean daily minimum °F (°C)	18.8 (−7.3)	23.8 (−4.6)	28.5 (−1.9)	33.5 (0.8)	42.2 (5.7)	48.9 (9.4)	55.5 (13.1)	53.4 (11.9)	44.5 (6.9)	34.4 (1.3)	26.3 (−3.2)	19 (−7)	35.7 (2.1)
Record low °F (°C)	−14 (−26)	−18 (−28)	−4 (−20)	11 (−12)	20 (−7)	30 (−1)	33 (1)	25 (−4)	25 (−4)	7 (−14)	−6 (−21)	−28 (−33)	−28 (−33)
Average precipitation inches (mm)	1.3 (33)	0.84 (21)	0.77 (20)	0.81 (21)	0.99 (25)	0.99 (25)	0.4 (10)	0.6 (15)	0.45 (11)	0.55 (14)	1.15 (29)	1.37 (35)	10.21 (259)
Average snowfall inches (cm)	8.7 (22)	3.6 (9.1)	1.3 (3.3)	0.4 (1.0)	0 (0)	0 (0)	0 (0)	0 (0)	0 (0)	0.1 (0.25)	3 (7.6)	9.2 (23)	26.2 (67)
Average precipitation days	8	6	7	6	7	6	3	3	3	4	8	8	69
