= Miller Memorial Airpark =

Airport in Oregon, United States

- IATA: none; ICAO: none; FAA LID: S49

Summary
- Airport type: Public
- Operator: City of Vale
- Location: Vale, Oregon
- Elevation AMSL: 2,249 ft / 685 m
- Coordinates: 43°57′49.5780″N 117°15′33.63″W
- Interactive map of Miller Memorial Airpark

Runways
Direction	Length		Surface
Direction	ft	m	Surface
18/36	3,872	1,180	Asphalt

Miller Memorial Airpark (FAA LID: S49) is a public airport located one mile (1.6 km) southwest of Vale in Malheur County, Oregon, USA.
