= Asphalt roll roofing =

Roofing material

Asphalt roll roofing or membrane is a roofing material commonly used for buildings that feature a low sloped roof pitch in North America. The material is based on the same materials used in asphalt shingles; an organic felt or fiberglass mat, saturated with asphalt, and faced with granular stone aggregate.

== Overview ==
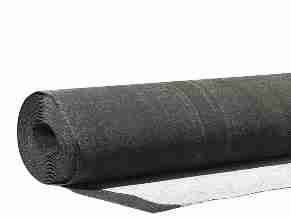

Roll roofing is usually restricted to a lightweight mat compared to shingles, as it must be rolled for shipment. Rolls are typically 36 inches (91 cm) by 33 feet (10 m) in size. Due to its light weight compared to shingles, roll roofing is regarded as an inexpensive, temporary material. Its broad width makes it vulnerable to temperature-induced shrinkage and tearing as it expands and contracts. Other names for this material are "asphalt prepared roofing, asphaltic felt, cold-process roofing, prepared roofing, rolled roofing, rolled strip roofing, roofing felt, sanded bituminous felt, saturated felt, self-finished roofing felt."

Roll roofing is normally applied parallel to the eaves from the bottom of the roof upwards, lapping each new roll in the same manner as shingles. Its use is restricted to roofs with a pitch of less than 2:12. To avoid penetrating the exposed membrane with nails, adhesive or "lap cement" must be used at the bottom edge to keep it from being lifted by the wind. The upper edge of the roll is nailed and covered by the next roll.

== History ==
The asphalt-prepared roofing industry had its beginning in Sweden more than a century ago, when roof boards were covered with paper treated with wood tar. Later, in Germany, paper was coated with varnish, surfaced with finely ground mineral matter, and used as a roofing material. In the United States, asphalt was used to waterproof duck fabric in the early part of the nineteenth century. The first recorded use of melted asphalt for impregnating duck fabric in this country was in 1844. About this time roofs composed of sheets of sheathing paper treated with pine tar and pine pitch, and surfaced with fine sand, were being laid. Coal tar and coal- tar pitch were later substituted for the pine tar. These were the forerunners of the present asphalt and coal-tar-pitch built-up roofs. It is not known definitely when felt was first substituted for sheathing paper or when asphalt was first used as the impregnating agent, but it is known that the first asphalt-prepared roofing, that is, roofing manufactured ready to apply, was marketed in 1893. The first roofing was not surfaced.

Mineral-surfaced, asphalt-prepared roofing appeared in 1897. The first asphalt shingles, mineral-surfaced, were made in 1901, and about this time slate grain less were first used as a surfacing material. Asphalt shingles did not come into general use until about 1911. During 1939, thirty-two manufacturers, representing about 95 percent of the asphalt-prepared roofing industry, produced 34,225,187 squares ^ of prepared roofing. Almost one third of this, 11,173,856 squares, was in the form of asphalt shingles, which are used principally for roofing dwellings. The shingles produced in 1939 were sufficient to cover more than 1,000,000 dwellings, assuming an average size of 10 squares per roof. In two surveys of roofing materials in 20 Eastern States, - made during 1938, the kinds of roofing materials on 20,841 dwellings along 4,038 miles of highway were tabulated. Of these dwellings, 6,549 were roofed with asphalt shingles and 2,381 with asphalt roll roofing. Thus, almost 43 percent of these dwelling were roofed with asphalt-prepared roofing. Statistics of the Bureau of the Census indicate that asphalt-prepared roll roofing and shingles constituted slightly less than half of all the roofing materials sold during 1937.

== Uses ==
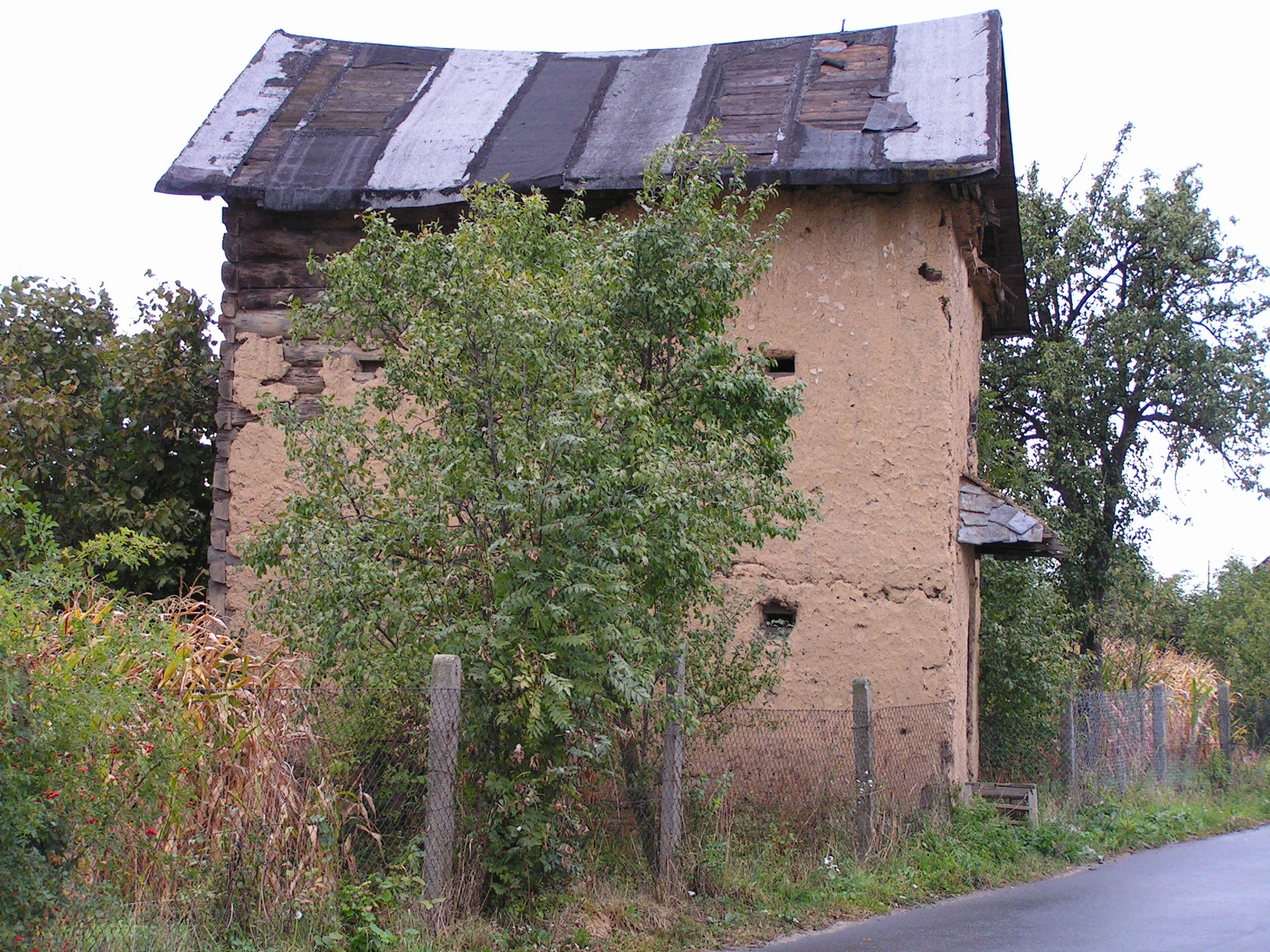
This roll roofing on the roof was applied vertically and is in very poor condition.

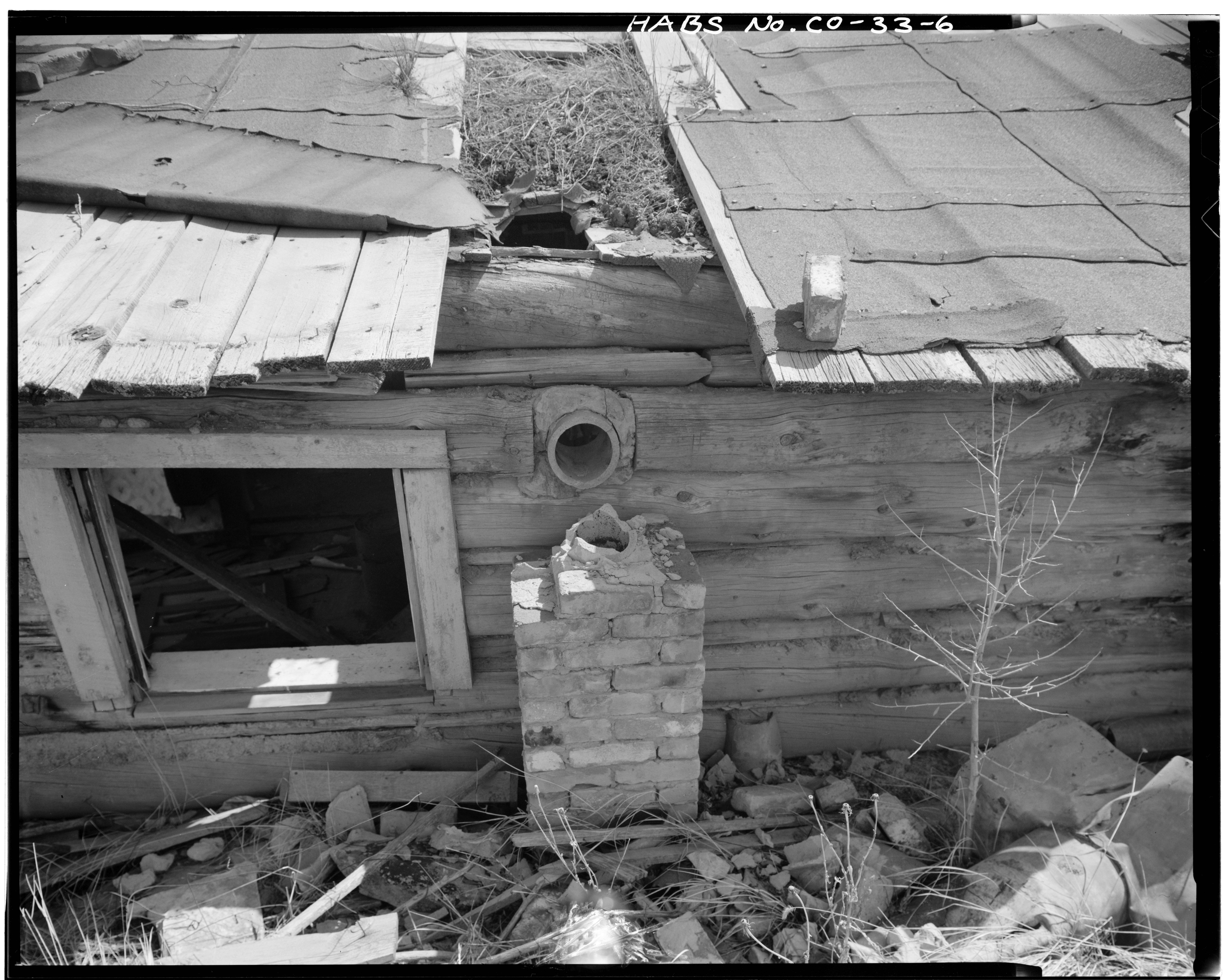
Horizontally applied roll roofing on a ruined log cabin. Image: American Historic Building Survey

The main uses are:

- for outbuildings
- on flat roofs on houses in the UK, a low cost limited life roofing method
- as a backup water catching & wind stopping layer under roofing slates & tiles

== Types ==
Several variations of bitumen roofing felt are available.

- Single coverage thicknesses range from 55 to 90 pounds per square (100 sq. ft.) for single-coverage
- Double coverage range from 110 to 140 pounds per square.

Fiber content:

- mixed rag fiber - lowest cost, shortest life
- all plastic fibers
- fiberglass - longest lived

Bitumen:

- bitumen - stiffens & hardens in winter, cracks in time
- modified bitumen - stays supple in winter, lasts better

Underside:

- Uncoated - most common, applied with adhesive or nails
- Self-adhesive - simpler to apply
- Torchable - applied by torching the underside, which partly melts and glues the sheet. (Most roofing felt is torchable.)

Topping:

- Sand - low cost
- Stone waste - prettier, better life expectancy. Only used on capsheet.
- Uncoated - used as undersheet

== Application methods ==
- Glue in place with bitumen/solvent mix
- Nail in place – relies on the clout nail head being driven slightly under the surface for a pressure seal. Waterproofing not quite perfect, a water durable timber layer is used under the felt, usually OSB or ply. Most common method on sheds.
- Hot bitumen
- Torch on – underside of felt melted with a torch and pressed in place
