= Nyssa, Oregon =

- City
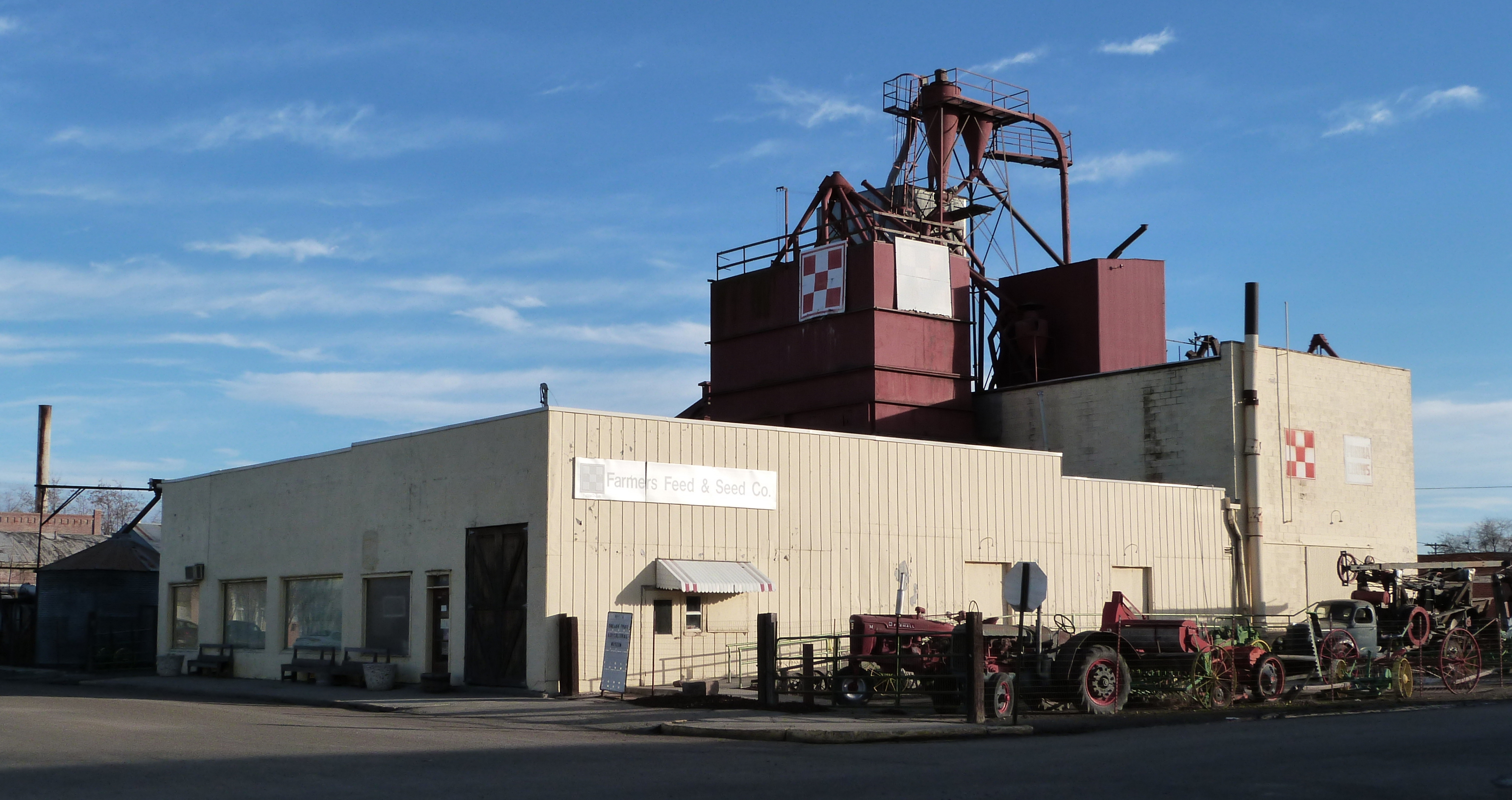
- Oregon Trail Agriculture Museum in Nyssa
- Nickname: Thunderegg Capital of the World
- Motto: Gateway to the Oregon Trail
- Location in Oregon
- Coordinates: 43°52′45″N 116°59′49″W
- Country: United States
- State: Oregon
- County: Malheur
- Incorporated: 1903

Area
  - Total: 1.55 sq mi (4.01 km^{2})
  - Land: 1.55 sq mi (4.01 km^{2})
  - Water: 0 sq mi (0.00 km^{2})
- Elevation: 2,192 ft (668 m)

Population (2020)
  - Total: 3,198
  - Density: 2,063.8/sq mi (796.84/km^{2})
- Time zone: UTC-7 (Mountain)
  - Summer (DST): UTC-6 (Mountain)
- ZIP Code: 97913
- Area code: 541
- FIPS code: 41-53750
- GNIS feature ID: 2411286
- Website: www.nyssacity.org

Nyssa (/ˈnɪsə/ NISS-ə) is a city in Malheur County, Oregon, United States. The population was 3,198 at the 2020 census. The city also holds the title of the Oregon city with the lowest median age at 25.1 years old. The city is located along the Snake River on the Idaho border, in the region of far eastern Oregon known as the "Treasure Valley". It is part of the Ontario, OR–ID Micropolitan Statistical Area.

The primary industry in the region is agriculture, including the cultivation of Russet potatoes, sugar beets, onions, corn, flower seed, mint, and wheat. The city's economy relies on the surrounding agricultural area with its several large onion and potato packaging plants.

== History ==
The area surrounding the city was originally inhabited by Native Americans. Northern Paiute and Cayuse frequented the area but had difficulty living in the relatively harsh climate. The original Fort Boise, established in the 1830s, is nearby to the southeast. The city was originally a shipping center for sheep and stock on the Union Pacific's main trunk line.

Experiments with growing sugar beets were begun in 1935 by R. H. Tallman, the Idaho district manager of the Amalgamated Sugar Company. Successful yields led to the first Amalgamated-designed and built factory, which began operation on October 9, 1938. The factory was located at 43.875298°N 116.990629°W, on both the Union Pacific Railroad lines and along U.S. Route 20.

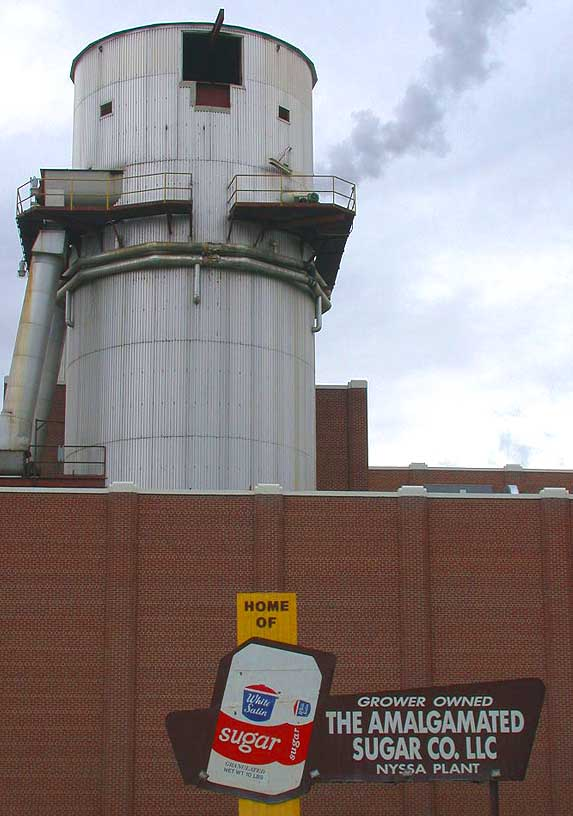
Sugar beet plant of the Amalgamated Sugar Company in Nyssa

In 1942, during World War II, Japanese Americans who had been removed from their West Coast homes worked in a farm labor camp outside Nyssa. Most of these internees came from the Portland Assembly Center and had volunteered to work in the Farm Security Administration camp to avoid incarceration. The camp consisted of approximately 100 canvas tents, each containing a wood stove and a bare light bulb, as well as laundry and bathroom facilities and one public tent used for meetings, dances and church services. Although the facilities were not fenced in and the laborers were trucked into Nyssa once a week for recreation and shopping, Japanese Americans were subject to a curfew and were not permitted to leave the camp without an escort. A total of some 400 men, women and children worked in the Nyssa camp, with a peak population of about 350. In November 1942, the tents being insufficient to keep out the winter cold, the camp was closed and most of the laborers moved to other FSA camps or private farms, or found employment and remained in Eastern Oregon (outside of the "exclusion zone" from which Japanese Americans were denied entry).

Near the end of the war, a branch camp for German and Italian prisoners of war from Camp Rupert, near Buhl, Idaho, was established. Those POWs helped with the sugar beet industry, typically through thinning and harvesting.

From 1936 until 2005, the Amalgamated Sugar Company (White Satin brand) owned and operated a sugar-processing plant that served as the city's main source of commerce. The closing of the plant resulted in the loss of 600 seasonal jobs. The Nyssa plant just a few years previously had produced more sugar than anywhere else for Amalgamated Sugar. To date the plant has been stripped of everything except the brown sugar line. The mechanic shop is still running. Beets are shipped to Nampa, Idaho. Nyssa also had a greenhouse and testing facilities which were later moved to Twin Falls.

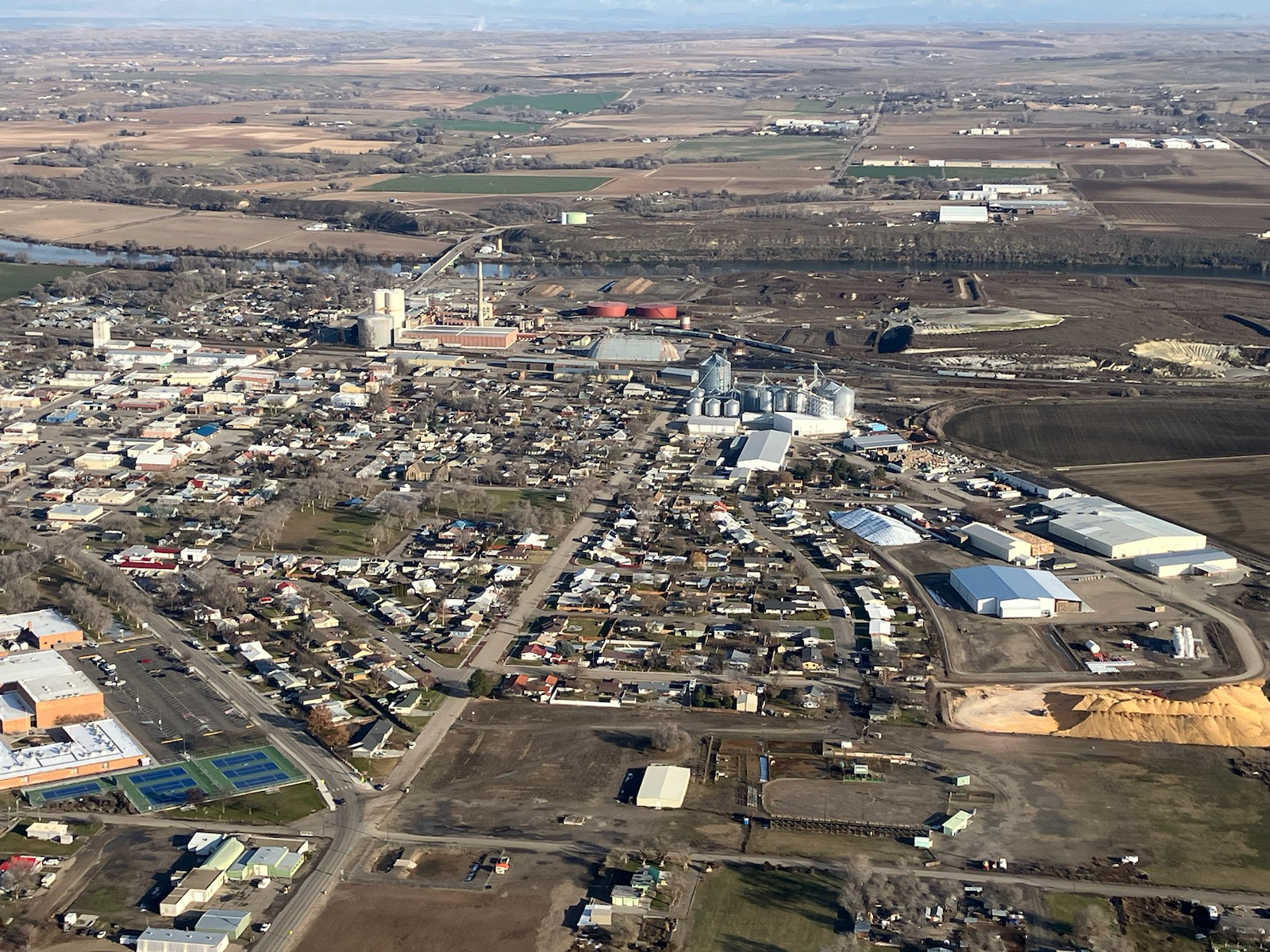
Nyssa looking east with the Snake River and Idaho visible in the background

== Geography ==
Nyssa is in eastern Oregon, on the west bank of the Snake River, which forms the border with Idaho. It is 12 miles (19 km) south of Ontario, Oregon, and 24 miles (39 km) northwest of Caldwell, Idaho.

Combined U.S. Routes 20 and 26 pass through Nyssa, leading southeast to Parma and Caldwell in Idaho, and northeast 20 miles (32 km) to Vale. Oregon Route 201 leads south from Nyssa 12 miles (19 km) to Adrian and north to Ontario.

According to the U.S. Census Bureau, Nyssa has a total area of 2.08 square miles (5.39 km^{2}), all of it land.

== Climate ==
According to the Köppen Climate Classification system, Nyssa has a semi-arid climate, abbreviated "BSk" on climate maps.

Climate data for Nyssa, Oregon, 1991–2020 normals, extremes 1937–2020
Month	Jan	Feb	Mar	Apr	May	Jun	Jul	Aug	Sep	Oct	Nov	Dec	Year
Record high °F (°C)	64 (18)	68 (20)	82 (28)	92 (33)	100 (38)	108 (42)	109 (43)	106 (41)	100 (38)	92 (33)	78 (26)	67 (19)	109 (43)
Mean maximum °F (°C)	50.7 (10.4)	59.2 (15.1)	70.5 (21.4)	79.9 (26.6)	89.7 (32.1)	97.0 (36.1)	102.6 (39.2)	100.7 (38.2)	93.7 (34.3)	82.2 (27.9)	64.3 (17.9)	54.4 (12.4)	103.2 (39.6)
Mean daily maximum °F (°C)	35.4 (1.9)	44.2 (6.8)	54.9 (12.7)	62.7 (17.1)	71.9 (22.2)	80.5 (26.9)	90.9 (32.7)	89.2 (31.8)	78.7 (25.9)	64.2 (17.9)	46.6 (8.1)	36.3 (2.4)	63.0 (17.2)
Daily mean °F (°C)	29.8 (−1.2)	35.8 (2.1)	44.3 (6.8)	50.7 (10.4)	59.9 (15.5)	67.5 (19.7)	76.6 (24.8)	74.1 (23.4)	64.0 (17.8)	50.9 (10.5)	38.1 (3.4)	30.2 (−1.0)	51.8 (11.0)
Mean daily minimum °F (°C)	24.2 (−4.3)	27.4 (−2.6)	33.7 (0.9)	38.6 (3.7)	47.9 (8.8)	54.5 (12.5)	62.3 (16.8)	59.1 (15.1)	49.4 (9.7)	37.7 (3.2)	29.5 (−1.4)	24.1 (−4.4)	40.7 (4.8)
Mean minimum °F (°C)	8.5 (−13.1)	16.0 (−8.9)	22.1 (−5.5)	27.9 (−2.3)	34.6 (1.4)	41.3 (5.2)	50.0 (10.0)	47.0 (8.3)	37.7 (3.2)	26.2 (−3.2)	15.2 (−9.3)	9.5 (−12.5)	3.1 (−16.1)
Record low °F (°C)	−19 (−28)	−18 (−28)	10 (−12)	20 (−7)	24 (−4)	29 (−2)	35 (2)	37 (3)	28 (−2)	13 (−11)	−1 (−18)	−18 (−28)	−19 (−28)
Average precipitation inches (mm)	1.38 (35)	0.79 (20)	0.92 (23)	0.99 (25)	1.15 (29)	0.72 (18)	0.25 (6.4)	0.16 (4.1)	0.54 (14)	0.81 (21)	1.02 (26)	1.42 (36)	10.15 (257.5)
Average snowfall inches (cm)	3.3 (8.4)	1.2 (3.0)	0.2 (0.51)	0.0 (0.0)	0.0 (0.0)	0.0 (0.0)	0.0 (0.0)	0.0 (0.0)	0.0 (0.0)	0.0 (0.0)	0.8 (2.0)	2.8 (7.1)	8.3 (21.01)
Average precipitation days (≥ 0.01 in)	8.0	6.1	8.1	7.0	6.9	4.8	1.7	1.3	2.7	5.0	7.5	8.9	68.0
Average snowy days (≥ 0.1 in)	3.2	1.1	0.3	0.0	0.0	0.0	0.0	0.0	0.0	0.0	0.5	2.6	7.7
Source 1: NOAA
Source 2: National Weather Service

== Demographics ==
Historical population
Census	Pop.	Note	%±
1910	449		—
1920	563		25.4%
1930	821		45.8%
1940	1,855		125.9%
1950	2,525		36.1%
1960	2,611		3.4%
1970	2,620		0.3%
1980	2,862		9.2%
1990	2,629		−8.1%
2000	3,163		20.3%
2010	3,267		3.3%
2020	3,198		−2.1%
U.S. Decennial Census

=== 2020 census ===
As of the 2020 census, Nyssa had a population of 3,198. The median age was 31.0 years. 31.5% of residents were under the age of 18 and 14.0% of residents were 65 years of age or older. For every 100 females there were 97.4 males, and for every 100 females age 18 and over there were 94.6 males age 18 and over.

0% of residents lived in urban areas, while 100.0% lived in rural areas.

There were 1,024 households in Nyssa, of which 40.8% had children under the age of 18 living in them. Of all households, 46.0% were married-couple households, 19.2% were households with a male householder and no spouse or partner present, and 27.8% were households with a female householder and no spouse or partner present. About 23.9% of all households were made up of individuals and 11.5% had someone living alone who was 65 years of age or older.

There were 1,134 housing units, of which 9.7% were vacant. Among occupied housing units, 64.1% were owner-occupied and 35.9% were renter-occupied. The homeowner vacancy rate was 2.7% and the rental vacancy rate was 6.8%.

Racial composition as of the 2020 census
Race	Number	Percent
White	1,561	48.8%
Black or African American	7	0.2%
American Indian and Alaska Native	51	1.6%
Asian	13	0.4%
Native Hawaiian and Other Pacific Islander	5	0.2%
Some other race	904	28.3%
Two or more races	657	20.5%
Hispanic or Latino (of any race)	2,024	63.3%

=== 2010 census ===
As of the census of 2010, there were 3,267 people, 1,051 households, and 758 families residing in the city. The population density was 2,107.7 inhabitants per square mile (813.8/km^{2}). There were 1,153 housing units at an average density of 743.9 per square mile (287.2/km^{2}). The racial makeup of the city was 63.1% White, 0.3% African American, 0.7% Native American, 1.3% Asian, 30.9% from other races, and 3.8% from two or more races. Hispanic or Latino of any race were 60.5% of the population.

There were 1,051 households, of which 45.1% had children under the age of 18 living with them, 50.0% were married couples living together, 14.2% had a female householder with no husband present, 7.9% had a male householder with no wife present, and 27.9% were non-families. 24.5% of all households were made up of individuals, and 13% had someone living alone who was 65 years of age or older. The average household size was 3.08 and the average family size was 3.71.

The median age in the city was 30.1 years. 34.5% of residents were under the age of 18; 9.3% were between the ages of 18 and 24; 23.7% were from 25 to 44; 19.3% were from 45 to 64; and 13.1% were 65 years of age or older. The gender makeup of the city was 50.1% male and 49.9% female.

== Education ==
The community is in Nyssa School District 26.

== Notable people ==
- John Bates, football player
- Eva Castellanoz, artist, activist, educator
- Leo Long, athlete
