= Basque Americans in Oregon =

Ethnic group in the United States

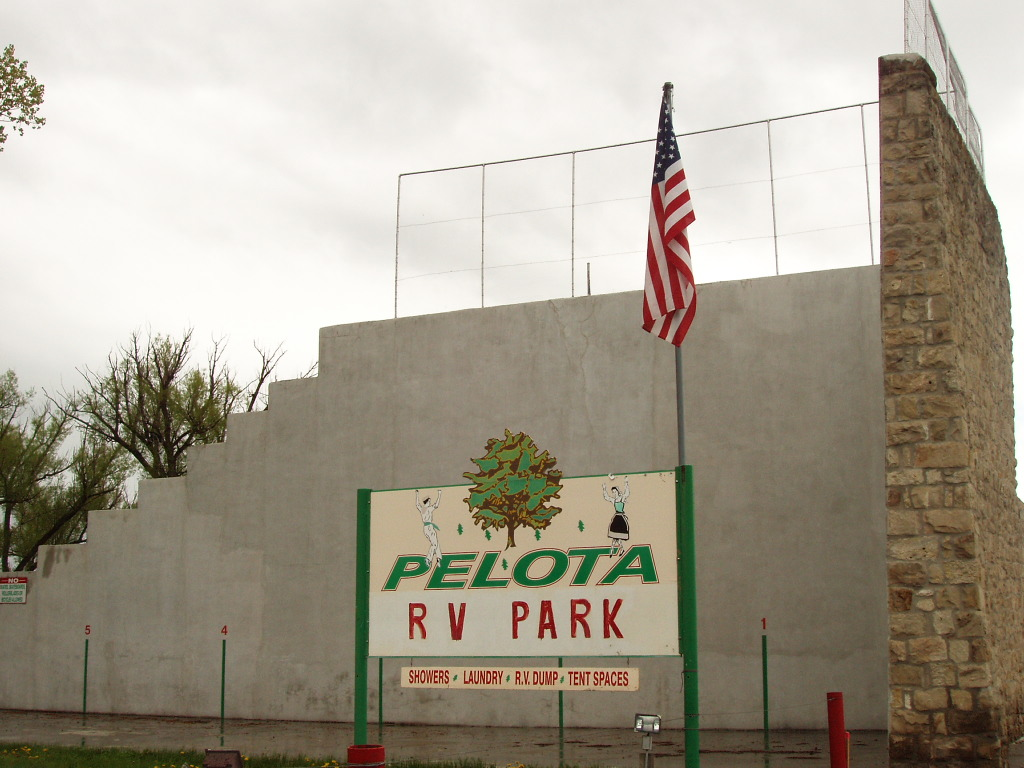
Pelota Fronton, a Basque pelota ball court and landmark in Jordan Valley.

The first Basque immigrants to Oregon arrived in the 1880s. Most were sheepherders who had migrated north from California and Nevada. Areas of Basque settlement include Arock and Jordan Valley in Malheur County, Oregon and a smaller number in Harney County. The Basque migration peaked in the 1920s and 1930s, only beginning to undergo decline in the 1940s. By the end of the 20th century, the Basque population shifted and now many live in eastern Oregon and the Portland metropolitan area.

== See also ==
- Basque, Oregon
- Pelota Fronton
- Idahoan Basques
