= Winnemucca Hotel =

- U.S. National Register of Historic Places
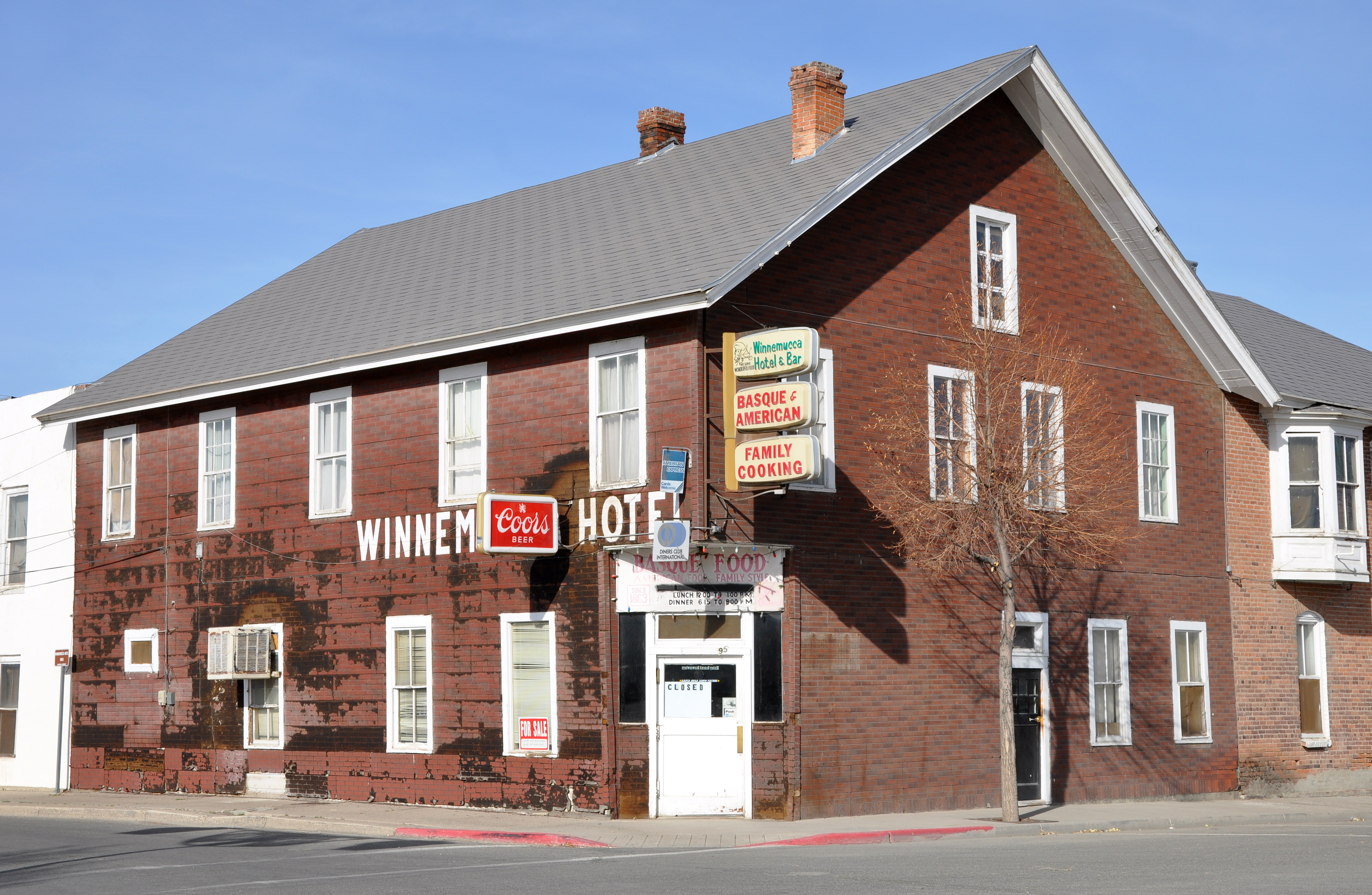
- Photo in April, 2013

- Location within Nevada Location within the United States
- Location: 95 S. Bridge St., Winnemucca, Nevada
- Coordinates: 40°58′28″N 117°44′15″W
- Area: 0.4 acres (0.16 ha)
- Built: 1863
- Built by: Lay Bros.
- Architectural style: Early Commercial
- NRHP reference No.: 05000471
- Added to NRHP: May 26, 2005

The Winnemucca Hotel, located at 95 S. Bridge St. in Winnemucca, Nevada, was an Early Commercial style structure built in 1863. The structure was demolished in 2019.

It was listed on the National Register of Historic Places in 2005.

It was one of the oldest buildings in Winnemucca and is significant for its role in commercial development of Winnemucca and for association with Basque sheepherders. It has been known for its signature cocktail, Picon Punch. The hotel was demolished between 2015 and 2019.

== See also ==
- Basque cuisine
- List of Basque restaurants
- Martin Hotel – also in Winnemucca and known for its association with Basque sheepherders
