= Picon (apéritif) =

Citrus and herb-flavoured bitters

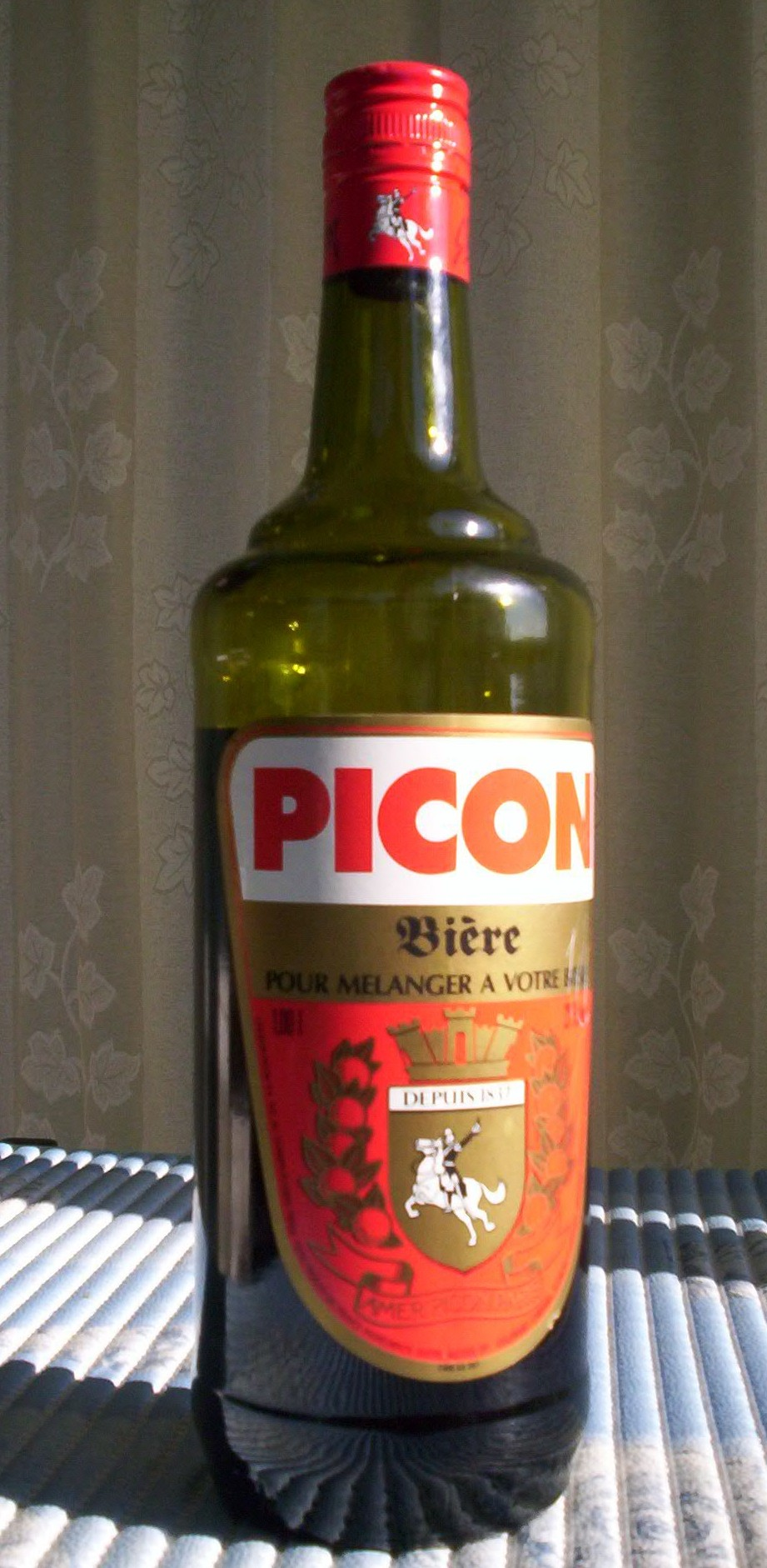
Bottle of 21% ABV Picon Bière

Picon is a caramel-coloured, flavoured bitters drunk as an apéritif, which traditionally accompanies beer in the east and north of France.

It is made from a base of fresh oranges which are dried and mixed with a solution of alcohol which is distilled. Picon also contains gentian and Cinchona in equal measures. Sugar, syrup and caramel are added last.

== Origins ==
Gaétan Picon, born in 1809, was a scholar who had an apprenticeship at the distilleries of Aix-en-Provence, Toulon and Marseille. In 1837, after taking a trip to Algeria where he had been in the French Army, he invented Picon. The aperitif was placed in the category of bitters and was 39% alcohol by volume (ABV). At the time, Gaétan Picon had created the first distillery to produce African bitters in an Algerian village. He then went on to open a number of other distilleries in Constantine, Bône and Algiers.

In 1862, the French government invited industry to take part in the Universal Exhibition in London. Jean-Baptiste Nouvion, the sub-prefect of Philippeville, urged Gaétan Picon to bring his aperitif to the exhibition. But, failing to convince the manufacturer to take part, the sub-prefect stubbornly took it upon himself (without telling Mr. Picon) to ship a case of African Amer to London. The product ended up crowned with a bronze medal in the bitter aperitif category, greatly adding to Gaétan Picon's eventual fortune.

In 1872, Gaétan Picon returned to France, creating the first factory for the production of Picon in Marseille, which is still in use today. In 1937, the company published a book called Histoire d'un Siècle Picon (1837–1937); the company slogan at the time was "Il n'est plus une partie du globe où n'ait pénétré le Picon!" (literal translation: 'There is no longer any part of the world where Picon hasn't penetrated'). The slogan involves a common pun in French.

== Today ==
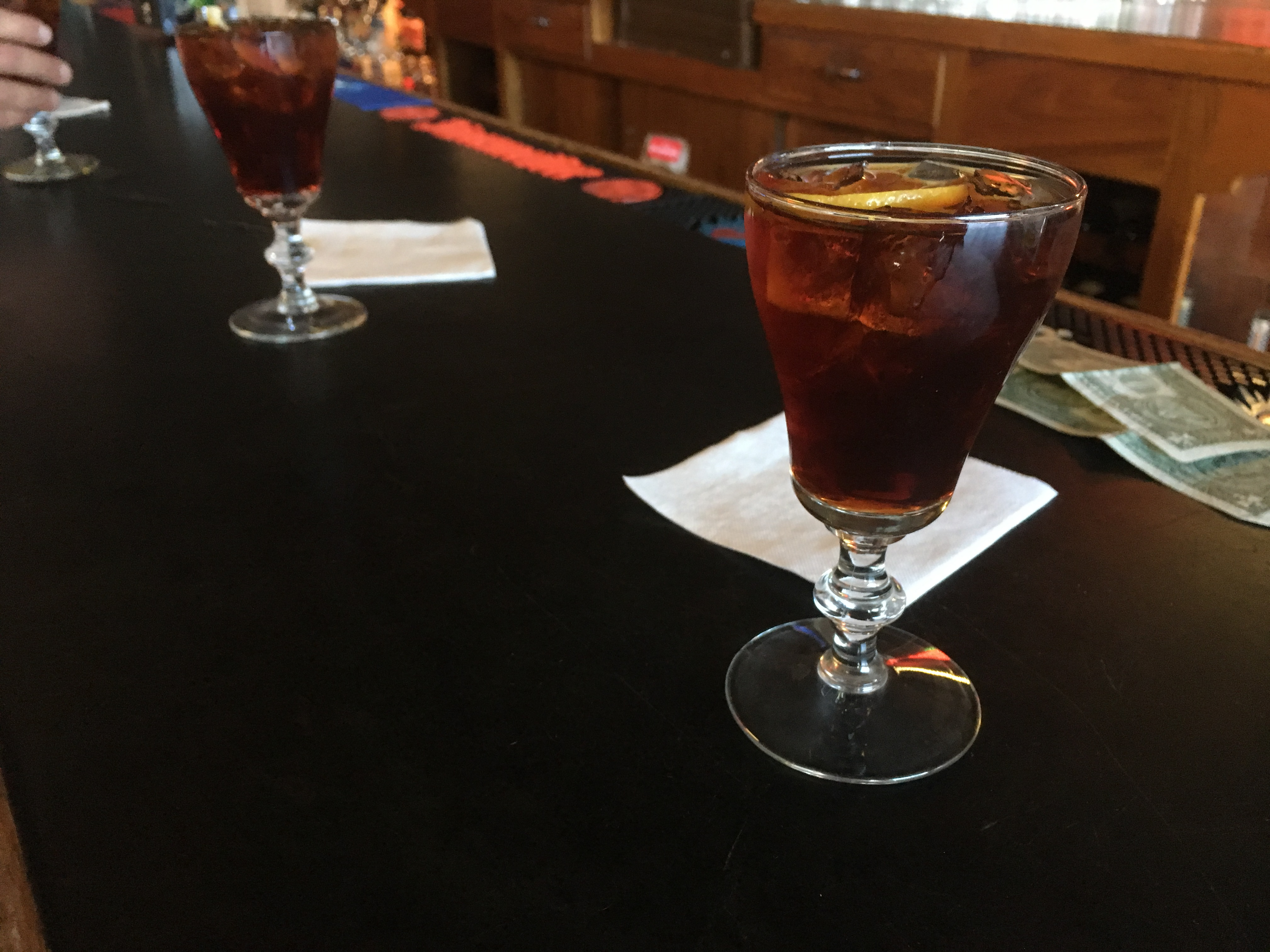
Picon Punch, served in the traditional custom glass used in Northern Nevada. Santa Fe Hotel, Reno, Nevada.

Since 1995 Picon has diversified, and now makes two different aperitifs:

- The original Picon bière, which accompanies beer.
- Picon club, to drink in cocktails with dry white wine.

In the 1970s, the strength of Picon was reduced from 30% to 25% ABV. In 1989, it was reduced yet again to 18% ABV.

In 2003 the drink was mainly sold (70%) in the north and east of France. The total production was 4 million bottles.

Picon Punch is a mixed drink featuring Amer Picon, originating in Europe and popular among Basque immigrants in the United States. It is primarily served in Boise, Idaho; Bakersfield, California; and throughout northern Nevada. The drink is almost never made in Basque Country however.

The unavailability of Picon in America has led to the use of local substitutes. Torani Amer is the most popular, and the specified liquor in a bill proposing to make Picon Punch the official Nevada state cocktail. Other substitutes include Bigallet China-China liqueur, also made in France, but more available in the US, and clones produced by local distilleries, including The Depot Craft Brewery Distillery in Reno, Nevada and Golden Moon Distillery in Golden, Colorado. Amer Boudreau is a DIY drink created by Seattle-based mixologist, bartender and author Jamie Boudreau to the specifications of the pre-1970 recipe for Picon.
