= Jose Antonio Bengoechea =

Basque-American businessman

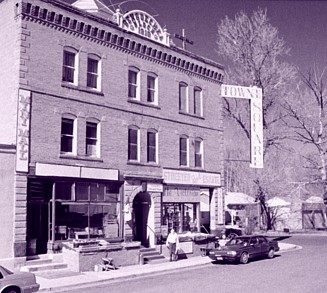
The Bengoechea Hotel

Jose Bengoechea Anduiza (December 1861 – November 12, 1921) was a Basque-American born in Bedarona, Biscay, Spain. He is most notable for his self-made fortune in the early 20th century. He moved to the United States in 1897 and within twenty years he had a herd of over 100,000 sheep in southern Idaho. His motivation and ambition was seen through his many different roles as a local Basque "king" or "father" in Mountain Home, Idaho, serving as the Vice-President of the Mountain Home Bank and the owner of the finest hotel in the western United States at that time, The Bengoechea Hotel.

== Life in Basque Country ==
Jose was born in 1860 in the house of Zaracondegui in Bedarona, Spain. Life in Bedarona was hard; after the loss of two wars (Carlist wars) in Basque Country, Bedarona became very impoverished in the 1880s, but spirits were lifted by the news of the success of relatives and townsfolk in the territories of the western United States. The Bengoechea family had lived in Olabe since 1796, but the wars ruined them. The only option for Jose was to move to the New World and start a new life.

== Early years in the U.S. ==
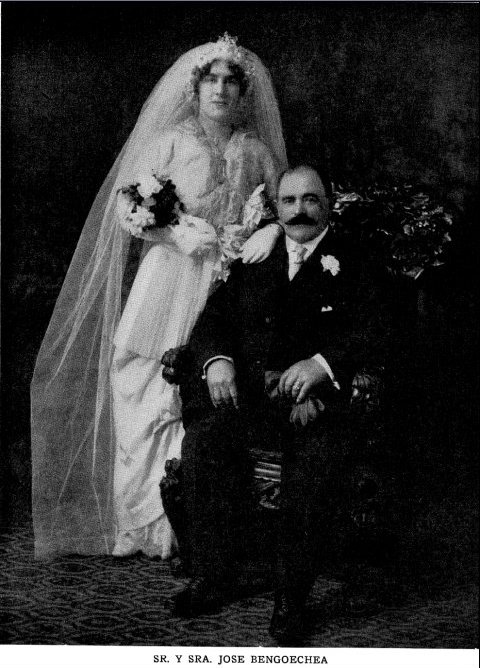
Wedding picture of Jose

Jose first moved to California then to Palo Alto, Nevada to work for the Altube family. He then moved to Bruneau, Idaho to start his own business. He was what we would call a modern day entrepreneur. He called on his brother Gabriel Bengoechea to come work on his farm and later called on Meliton Bengoechea; this was the beginning of his successful life as an American immigrant. The Bengoechea sheep company broke down into the Bill Smith Sheep Company and the Wood Creek Sheep Company after Jose's death.

== Life in the U.S. ==
Jose was a millionaire, but illiterate. In 1900 he was the proprietor of an automobile when, in the United States, there had only been 14,000 registered cars. He did not know how to drive so he had to contract a driver. When people asked him what car was the best one, he always responded the same: "a new one".

He married in 1915 to Margarita Nachiondo Achabal, a Basque from Ispaster who had arrived at the country in 1912 and resided of Ogden, Utah. Margarita was 34 years younger and, in 1916, the first of his three children, Eva (1916–2007) was born. Soon thereafter Adam (1917–1984) and Joseph (1920–1964) were born. They lived in a beautiful mansion near the hotel.

== Death ==
Jose died on November 2, 1921, after which his family moved to Ogden, Utah. The hotel was subsequently owned by a corporation, run by Victor Yturri married with Cristina Plaza. The Yturris ran the hotel until about 1932. After his death most of the Bengoechea fortune was lost. Due to the Depression, his land and sheep were all worth nothing. The rest of the family moved to Ogden, Utah to start a new life.
