= Jean-Baptiste Nouvion =

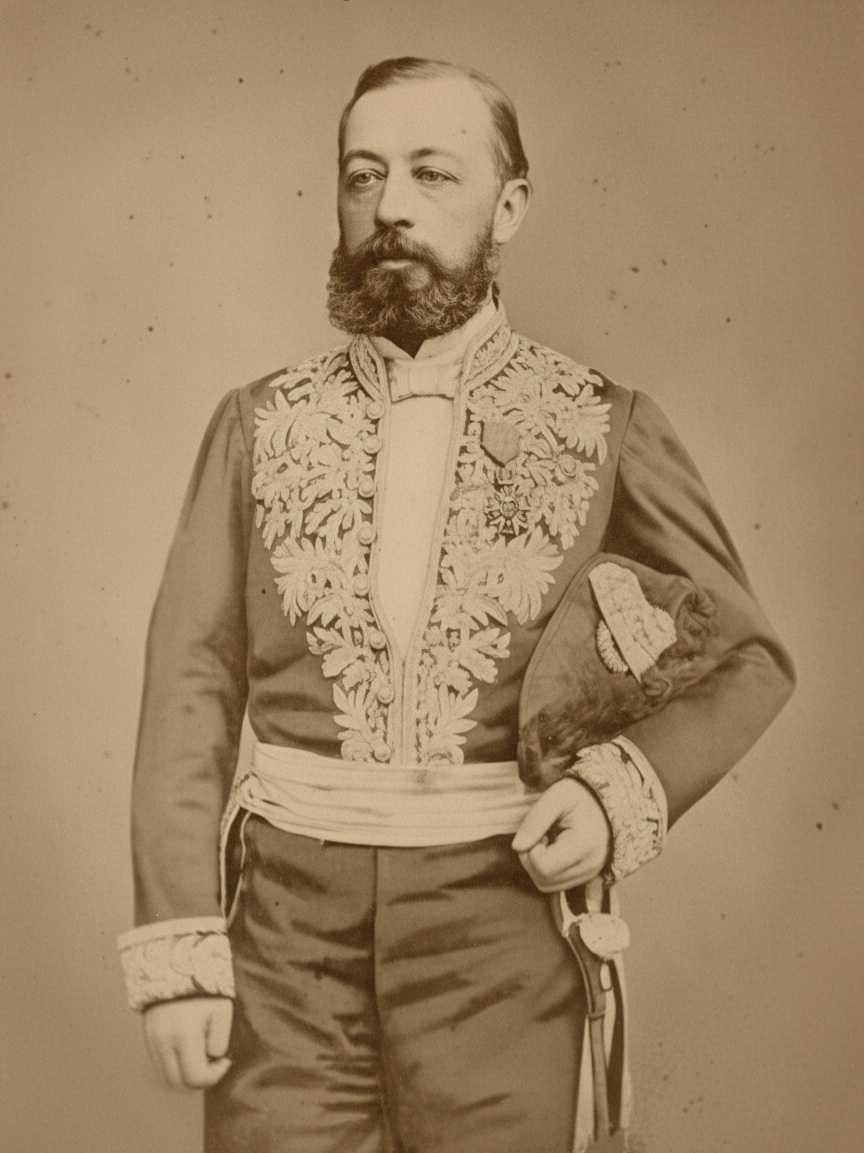

Prefect of Oran (Algeria)
- Monarch: Napoleon III
- In office 1873–1879

Personal details
- Born: 30 September 1833 Vars-sur-Roseix, French Empire
- Died: 1 August 1898 Vars-sur-Roseix, France
- Party: Bonapartist
- Spouse(s): Claire Chassériau, daughter of baron Charles Frédéric Chassériau, Chief architect of the cities of Marseille, Constantine and Algiers
- Profession: Official, prefect

Jean-Baptiste Nouvion (30 September 1833 – 1 August 1898) was a French prefect and a colonial administrator in Algeria. He made the success of the French aperitif Sirop de Picon.

== Career ==
Jean-Baptiste Nouvion entered the French administrative corps in the mid-19th century. He first served as chief of staff to prefects before holding sub-prefect appointments in Philippeville and later in mainland France.

He was appointed sub-prefect of Philippeville (present-day Skikda, Algeria), where he served during the Second French Empire and the early Third Republic.

Following the Franco-Prussian War, he continued his career in public administration and was appointed prefect of Oran in 1873.

As prefect of Oran (1873–1879), Nouvion oversaw civil administration during a period of expansion of French colonial settlement in western Algeria.

== Colonial administration ==
During his tenure in Algeria, Nouvion was involved in the implementation of French colonial governance structures, including land administration and settlement policies.

The town of El Ghomri in Algeria was historically named "Nouvion" during the French colonial period in recognition of his administrative role in the region.

== The prefect Nouvion and the aperitif Sirop de Picon ==
In 1862 the French government invited industry to take part in the Universal Exhibition in London. Jean-Baptiste Nouvion, the sub-prefect of Philippeville, urged Gaëtan Picon to bring his aperitif Sirop de Picon to the exhibition. But, failing to convince the manufacturer to take part, the sub-prefect stubbornly took it upon himself (without telling Mr. Picon) to ship a case of African Amer to London. The product ended up crowned with a bronze medal in the bitter aperitif category, greatly adding to Gaëtan Picon's eventual fortune.

== Honours ==
A city near Oran was named Nouvion as a recognition of his work. After the Independence of Algeria, the name of the city was changed to El Ghomri.

- France: Officier of the Legion of Honour by the emperor Napoléon III in 1865
- Spain: Commandeur of the Order of Isabella the Catholic
- Tunisia: Grand officier of the Order of Glory (Tunisia)

== Personal life ==
Jean-Baptiste Nouvion was married to Claire Chassériau, daughter of architect Charles Frédéric Chassériau.

He was the brother of Étienne Nouvion, a magistrate, writer, and art collector.
