= Aatxe (restaurant) =

Tapas bar and restaurant in San Francisco, California

Coordinates: 37°46′0.09″N 122°25′50.21″W

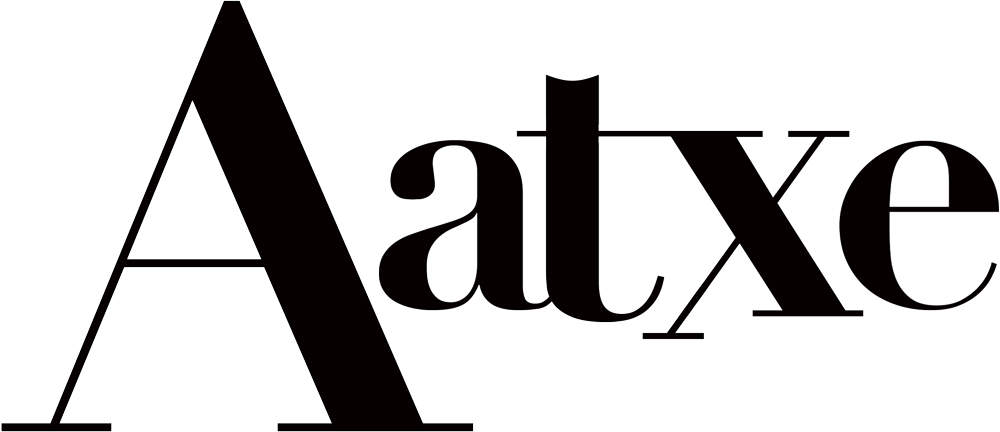

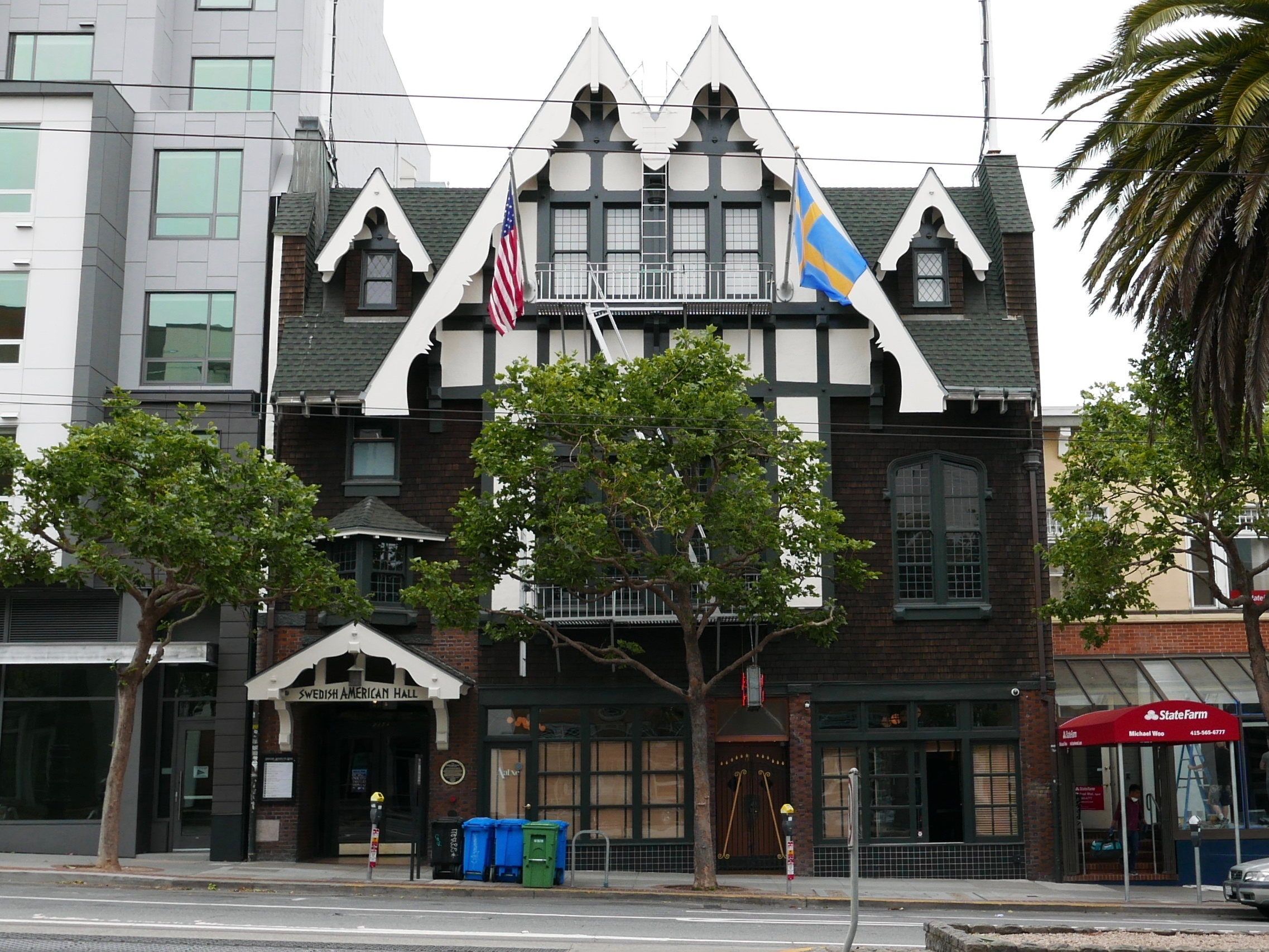
- The Swedish American Hall
- Interactive map of Aatxe

Restaurant information
- Established: April 17, 2015
- Owners: Ne Timeas Restaurant Group and The Bon Vivants
- Chef: Ryan Pollnow
- Food type: Basque tapas
- Dress code: Casual
- Location: 2174 Market St., San Francisco, San Francisco County, California, 94114, United States
- Seating capacity: 49
- Reservations: Yes
- Website: aatxesf.com

Aatxe was a Basque tapas bar and restaurant in San Francisco, California in the United States.

The bar was located in the Swedish American Hall, above Cafe Du Nord. Aaxte was designed by Stellah DeVille. Ryan Pollnow is the chef and creator of the concept for the bar. He was inspired by time he spent in San Sebastián, where he trained at Mugaritz.

They served cocktails, specializing in gin and tonics. They served over 50 different gins and 22 different tonics, including one on tap. The wine directors were Sam Bogue and Geno Tomko and Tommy Quimby was the bar manager.

For food, they served Basque pintxos. Pintxos' created by Pollnow include pickled mussels and anchovies, pork belly, and octopus. The bar had a music director, Megan Mayer. Aaxte was nominated as one of Bon Appétit's best new restaurants in American in 2015.

Very probably the name of the restaurant come from the name of Aatxe, a legendary creature of Basque mythology.

Aatxe closed in 2017.

== See also ==
- Basque cuisine
- List of Basque restaurants
