= Picon Punch =

Cocktail

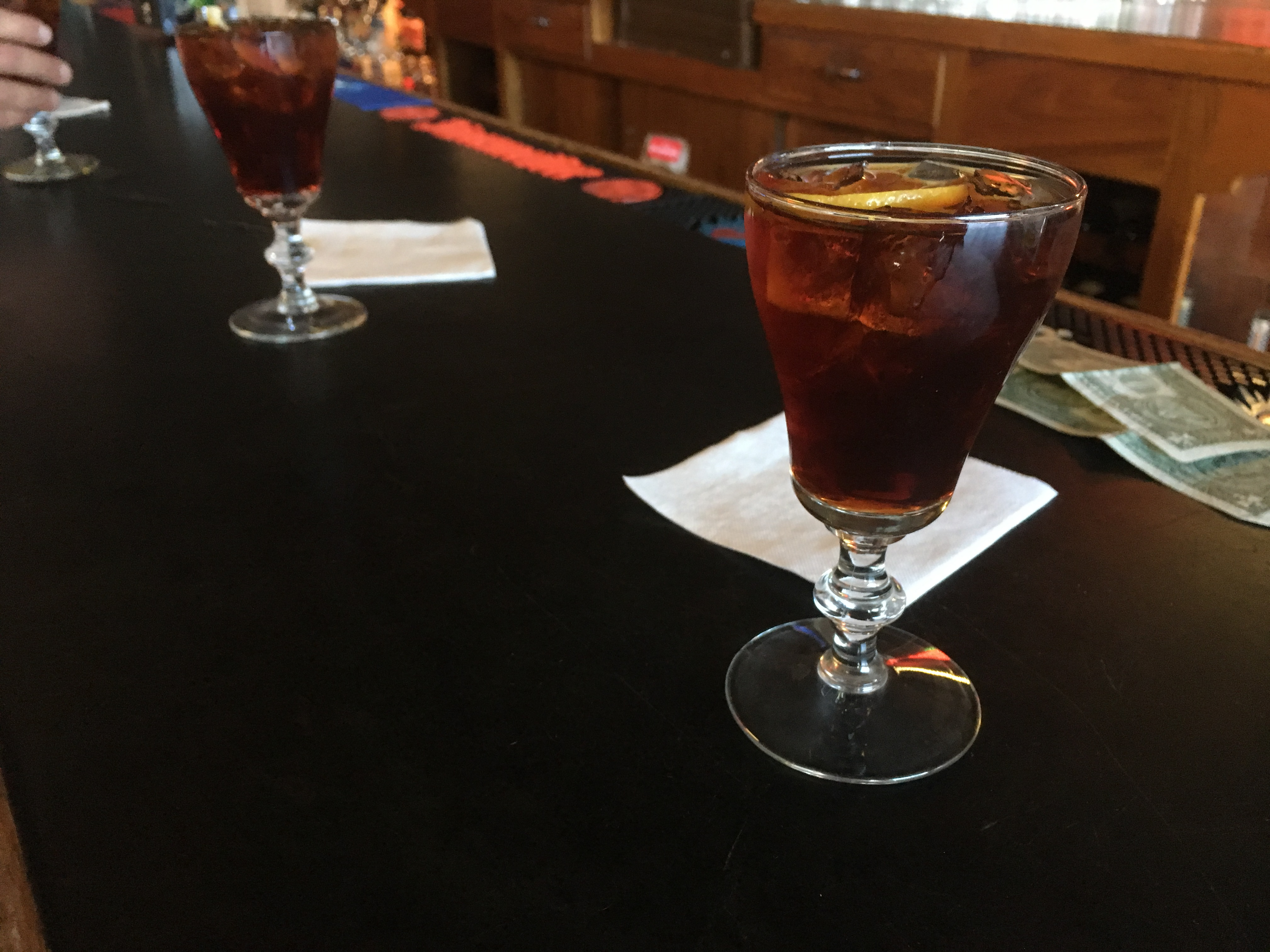
Picon Punch, served in the traditional custom glass used in Northern Nevada. Santa Fe Hotel, Reno, Nevada

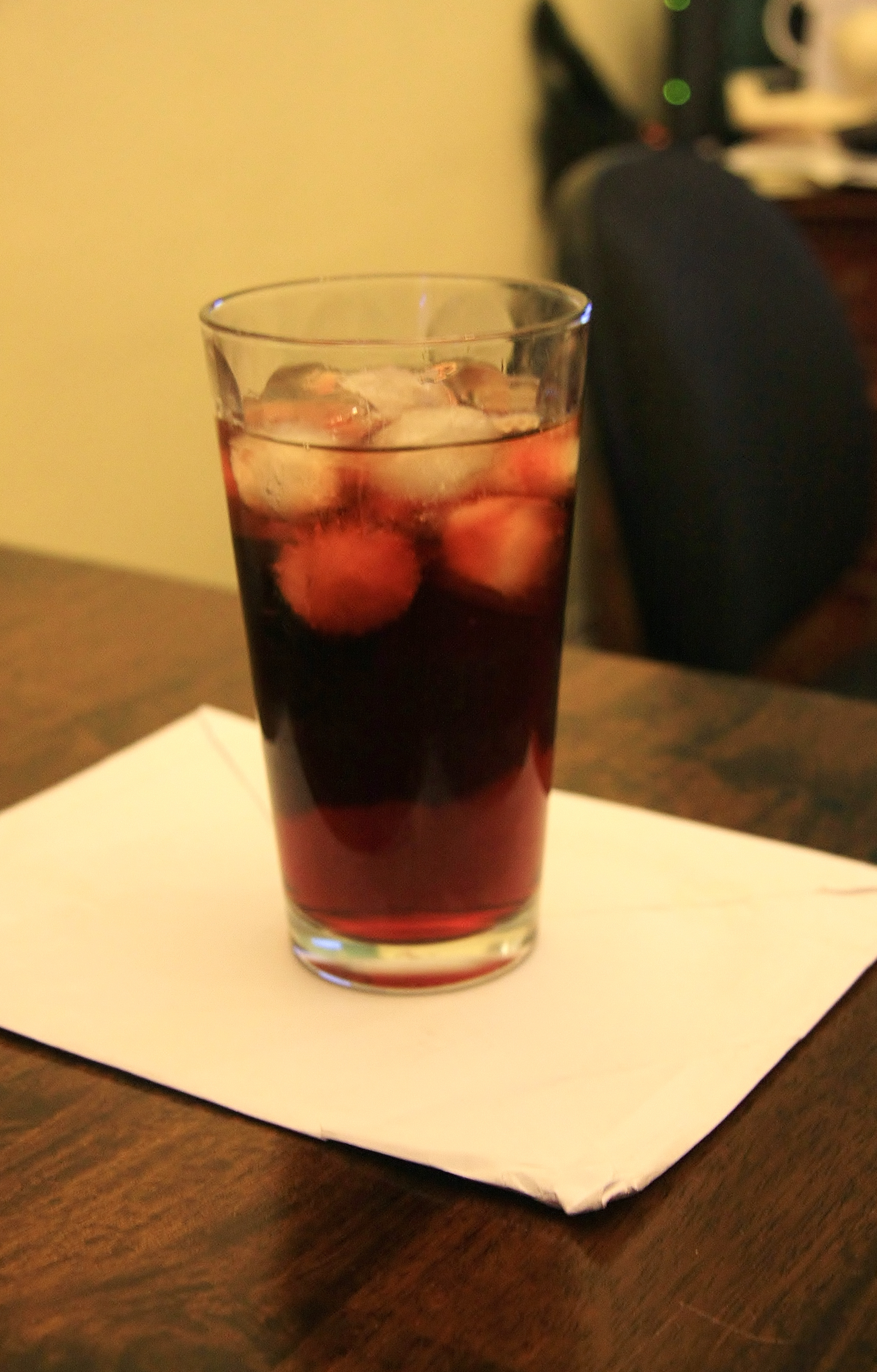
Picon Punch

Picon Punch, or simply Picon, is a cocktail made with Amer Picon or other orange Amaro liqueur, a splash of soda water, grenadine, a lemon twist, and some brandy. The drink is identified as Basque, but is not common in the Basque region in the Pyrénées. Basque immigrants in the U.S. however have embraced the drink, where it is popular in Basque restaurants and bars in the western USA, particularly southern Idaho, northern and central California, and northern Nevada.

== Description ==
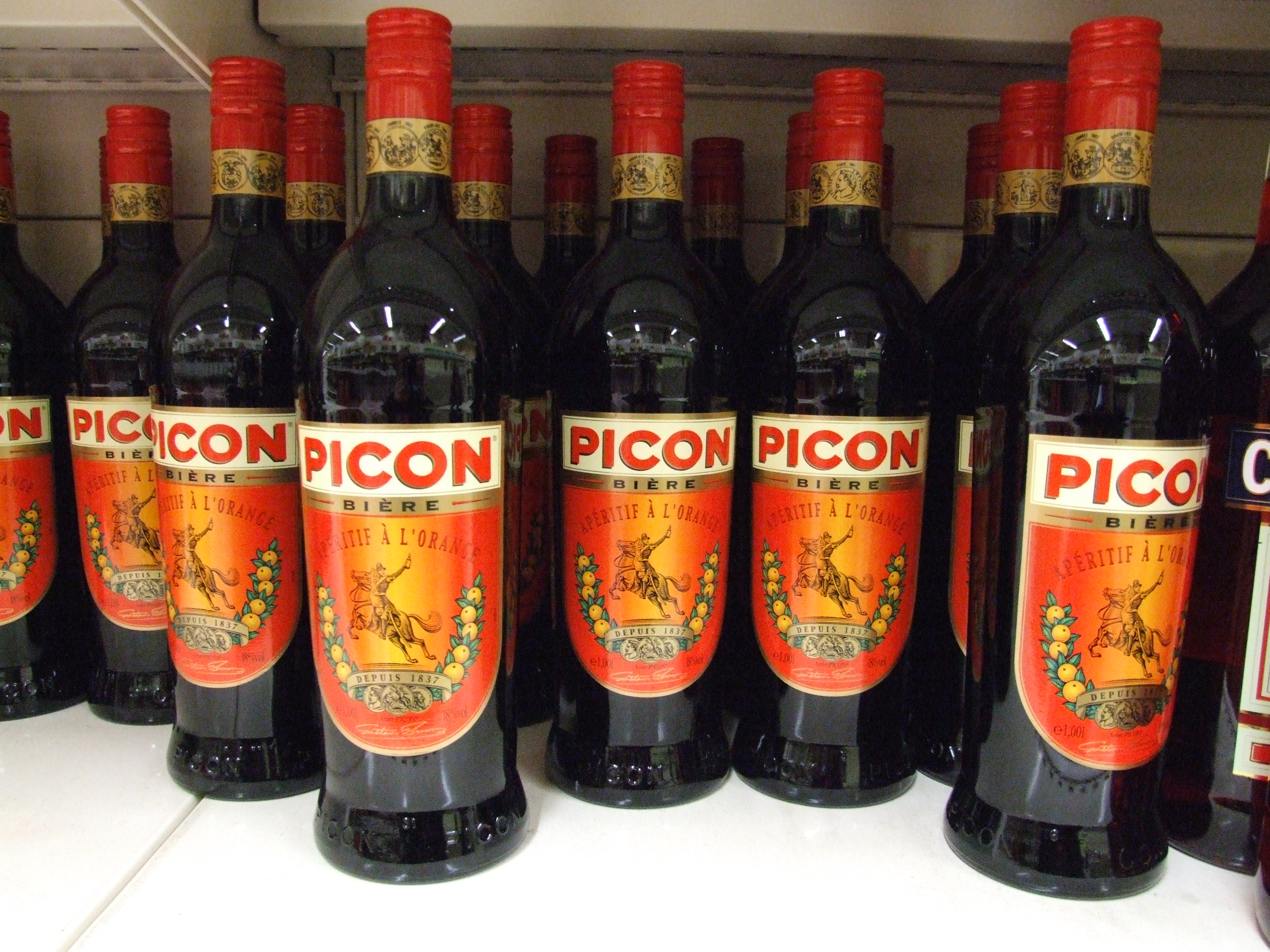
Bottles of Amer Picon liqueur

Picon Punch is traditionally made with Amer Picon, an orange liqueur from Marseille, France. It is not readily available in the United States. As a result bars in the USA use a substitute liquor; the most popular is Torani Amer.

In Northern Nevada, the Picon Punch is served with ice in a custom stemmed glass produced by the Louie Picon Glass Company of Sparks. In other regions, the drink is made in a highball or Collins glass filled with ice. At the J.T. Basque Bar and Dining Room in Gardnerville, it is served in a short 4 oz. glass.

== History ==
Picon Punch originated in Europe and remains popular among Basque immigrants in the United States. As of 2005, the drink was almost never made in Basque Country.

In 2024, there were shortages of Torani Amer resulting from supply chain interruptions from the COVID-19 pandemic in the United States and a production change, which required recertification by California authorities. During this time, there were shortages in Nevada with several bars and restaurants unable to make Picon Punch or using a different substitute liquor. Rumors appeared about the long term viability of the drink as Torani downplayed the liquor to focus on their flavored syrup business. In 2025, Torani transferred the recipe for Torani Amer to Ferino Distillery in Reno, Nevada.

In 2025, a bill was approved by the Nevada State Legislature designating Picon Punch the official state cocktail.

== See also ==
- Basque cuisine
- List of cocktails
