= Martin Hotel (Winnemucca, Nevada) =

- U.S. National Register of Historic Places
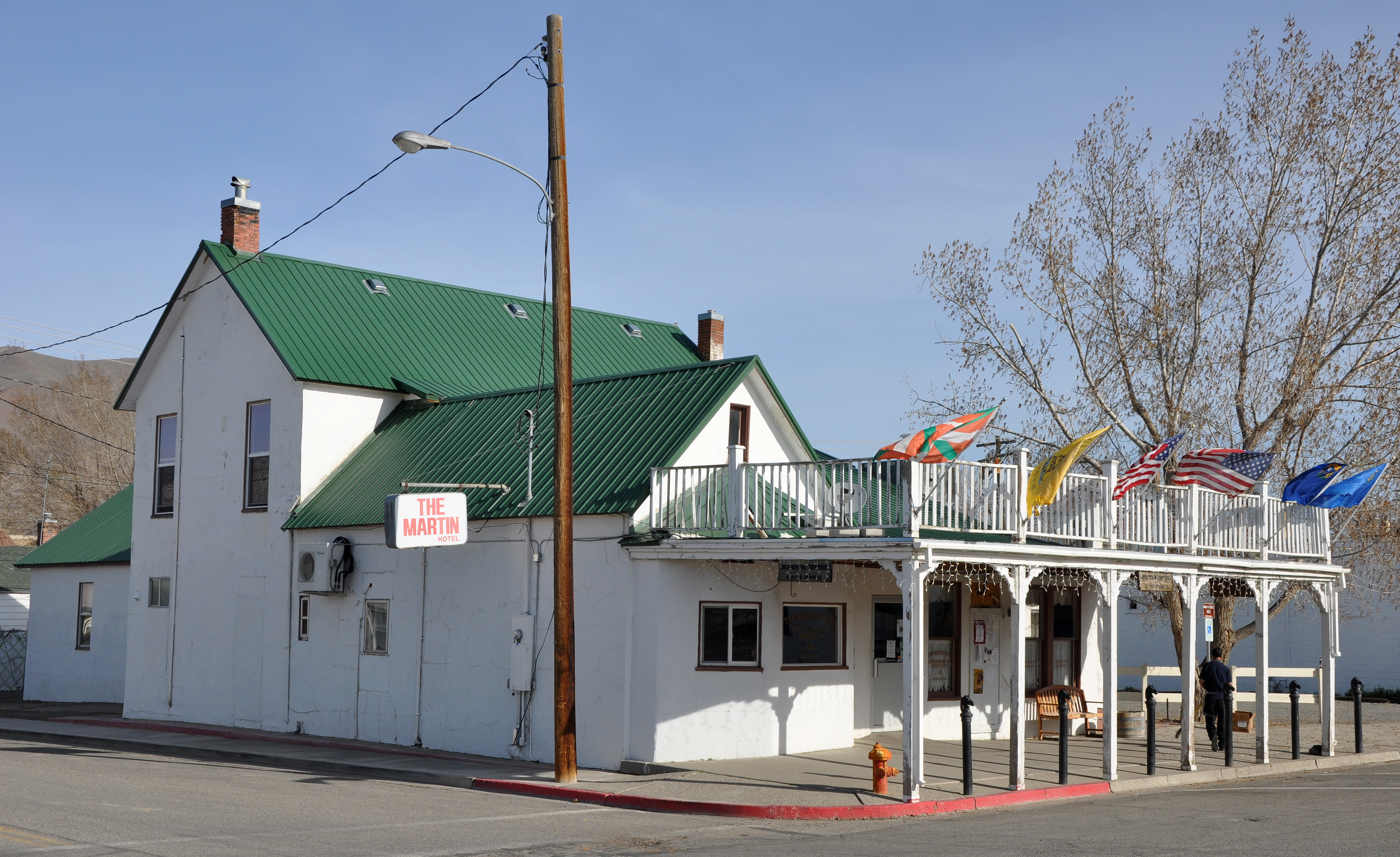

- Location within Nevada Location within the United States
- Location: 94 W. Railroad St., Winnemucca, Nevada
- Coordinates: 40°58′15″N 117°43′50″W
- Area: 0.2 acres (0.081 ha)
- Built: 1913
- Built by: Weikel, Charles (1920 reconstruction)
- Architectural style: Vernacular Commercial
- NRHP reference No.: 03001067
- Added to NRHP: October 24, 2003

The Martin Hotel, at 94 W. Railroad St. in Winnemucca, Nevada, was built in 1913. It is a historic hotel building, known also as Lafayette Hotel Annex and as Roman Tavern, which is listed on the National Register of Historic Places.

It is built in "Vernacular Commercial" style. It was listed on the National Register of Historic Places in 2003.

It is significant historically for its association with commerce in Winnemucca and for its association with Basque sheepherders. It served as a boardinghouse for the sheepherders, and, as of its NRHP listing in 2003, "continues to be known for its Basque cuisine."

== See also ==
- Basque cuisine
- List of Basque restaurants
- Winnemucca Hotel – also in Winnemucca and known for its association with Basque sheepherders
