= Pelota Fronton =

- U.S. National Register of Historic Places
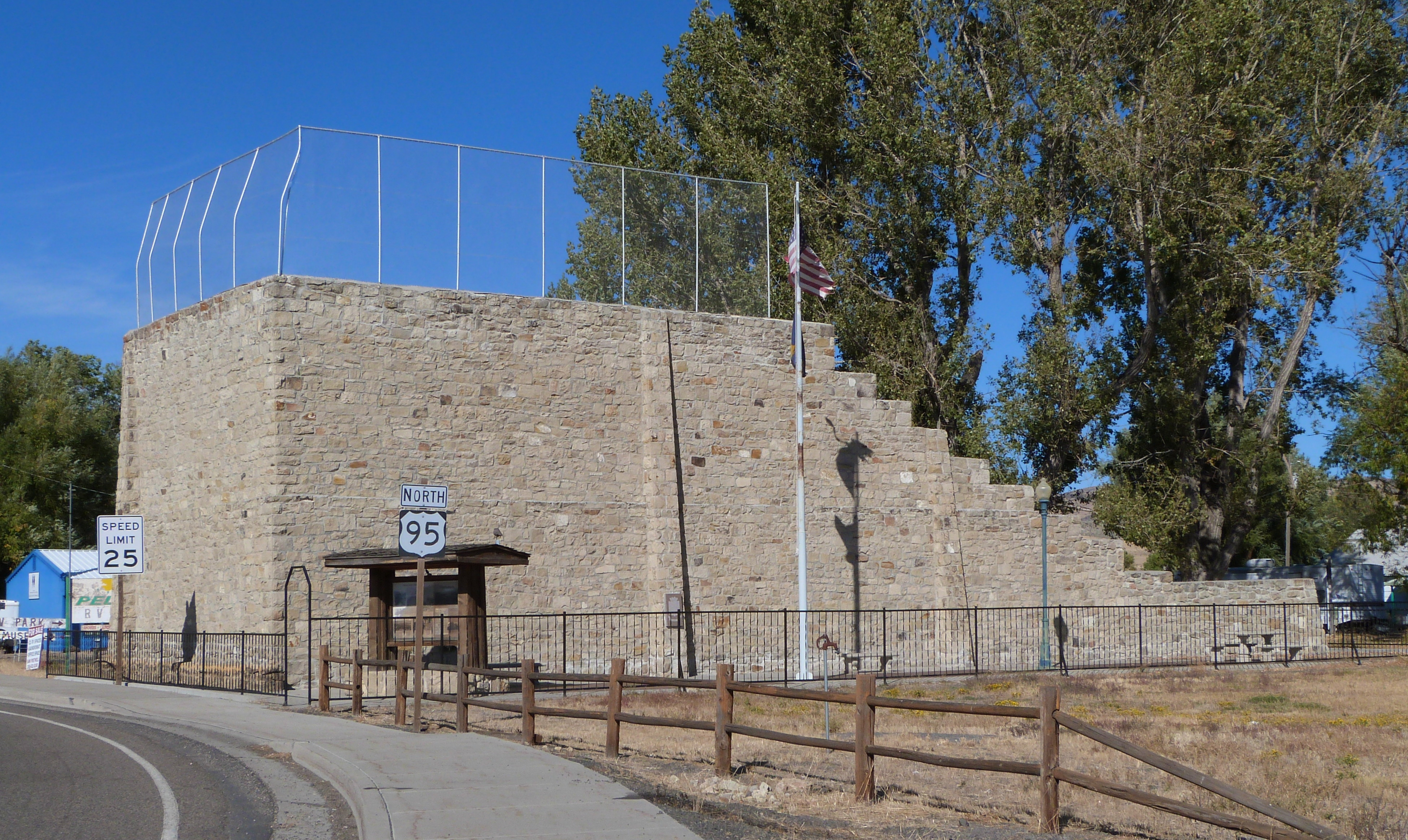
- The exterior of the Pelota Fronton in 2015

- Location within Oregon Location within the United States
- Location: Bassett St. (U.S. 95), Jordan Valley, Oregon
- Coordinates: 42°58′28″N 117°03′10″W
- Area: less than one acre
- Built: 1915
- NRHP reference No.: 72001084

The Pelota Fronton is a Basque pelota ball court and landmark in Jordan Valley, Oregon, United States.

== History ==
The court was built in 1915 and finished in 1917. It was last used regularly in 1935. This was caused by the Taylor Grazing Act of 1934. Jordan Valley had numerous Basque immigrants who came to herd sheep. After the act passed, the court gradually lost usage, and it started falling into disrepair over a span of roughly 4 decades. In 1972, the court was listed on the National Register of Historic Places.

In 1997, the court underwent a full renovation. Restoration included installation of a covered interpretive sign and a stone representation of the Zazpiak Bat, the coat of arms for the seven Basque provinces. A sign reads: “Jordan Valley Ko Frontoia restored 1997 danok etorri” in recognition of the inauguration of the restored pelota fronton in September 1997.

In Jordan Valley games, the wicker racket, or cesta, is not used. To this day, the court remains a symbol of Basque culture in the region.

== See also ==
- Basque diaspora
- Basque rural sports
- National Register of Historic Places listings in Malheur County, Oregon
