= Basque Americans in California =

Ethnic group in the United States

The presence of Basques in California dates back four centuries. Basque explorers arrived in what is now California in the late 16th and early 17th centuries.

There is a significant presence of Basque-Americans in the Bakersfield area. Many of Bakersfield's oldest and most historic restaurants are Basque, including Woolgrowers, Pyrenees, Benji's, and Narducci's. Noriega Hotel was another notable Basque restaurant that closed in 2020. Memorial Day weekend features the Kern County Basque Festival, sponsored by the Kern County Basque Club. This three-day festival features food, music, dance, and handball (pelota) games.

San Francisco is also home to many Basque-Americans, with a Basque hotel being built as early as the 1860s. The City also had a "Basquetown" located between Chinatown and Little Italy. Basque restaurants were plentiful through the twentieth century, but waned by 1996 when just one restaurant, Des Alpes, remained. The late 1990s brought a resurgence to Basque cuisine in San Francisco, where new restaurants offered cultural cuisine including pintxos, croquettes, and txakoli.

Basque Americans in California include Silicon Valley businessman John Arrillaga and U.S. representative and former California lieutenant governor John Garamendi. Explorer Juan Bautista de Anza was of Basque heritage.
