= Bengoechea Hotel =

- Mountain Home Hotel
- U.S. National Register of Historic Places
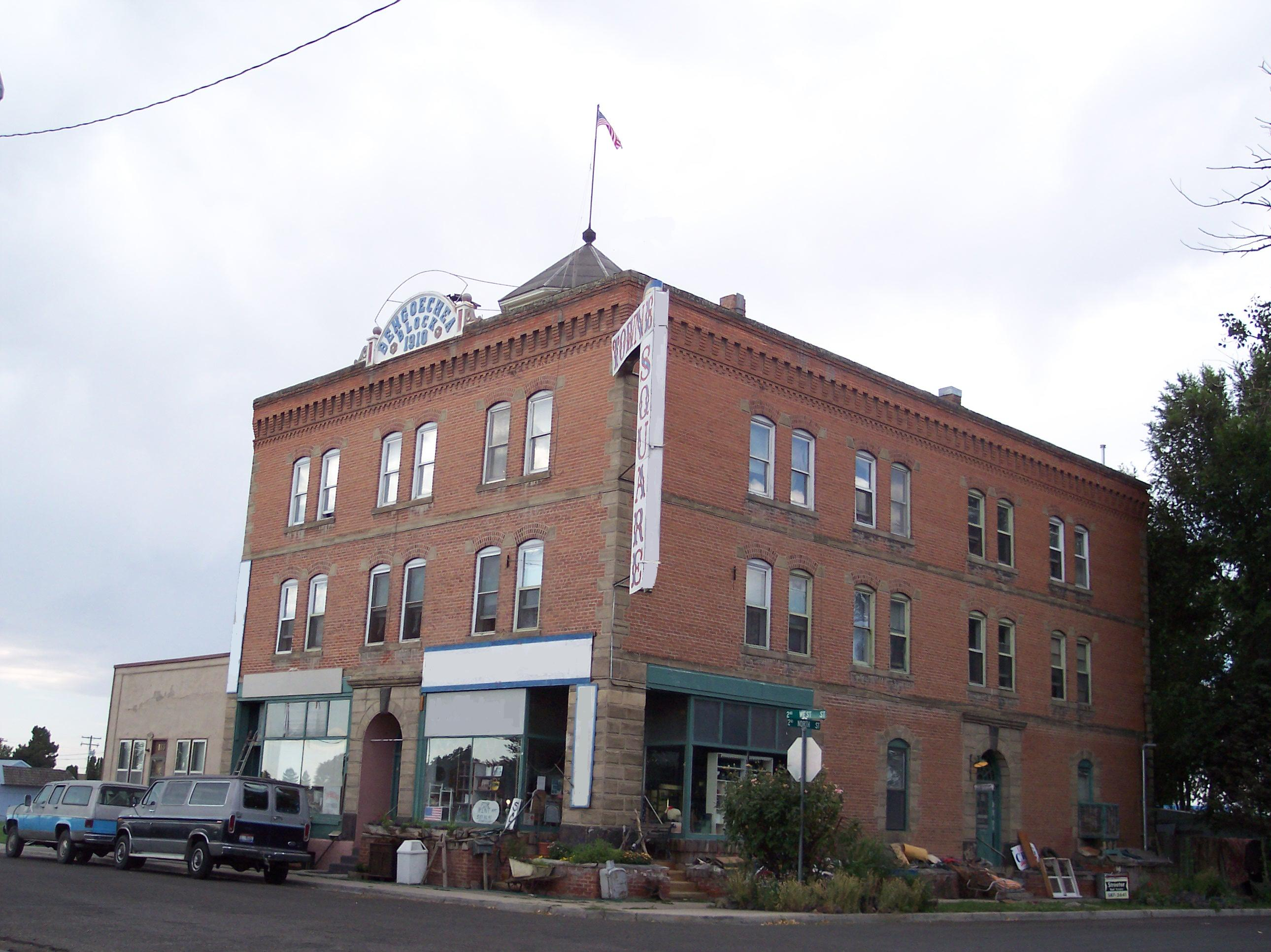
- The Bengoechea Hotel
- Location: 195 N. 2nd West St. Mountain Home, Idaho
- Coordinates: 43°07′50″N 115°41′47″W
- Built: 1910
- Architectural style: Romanesque
- NRHP reference No.: 82000385
- Added to NRHP: October 29, 1982

The Bengoechea Hotel was founded in 1910 by Jose Bengoechea. The building is a focal point of Basque American culture in Mountain Home, Idaho. The Bengochea Hotel and its surrounding area are known as "The Bengoechea Block". In June 2007 the building was sold to Mirazim Shakoori who plans on restoring the building to its original condition for the 100th anniversary in 2010.

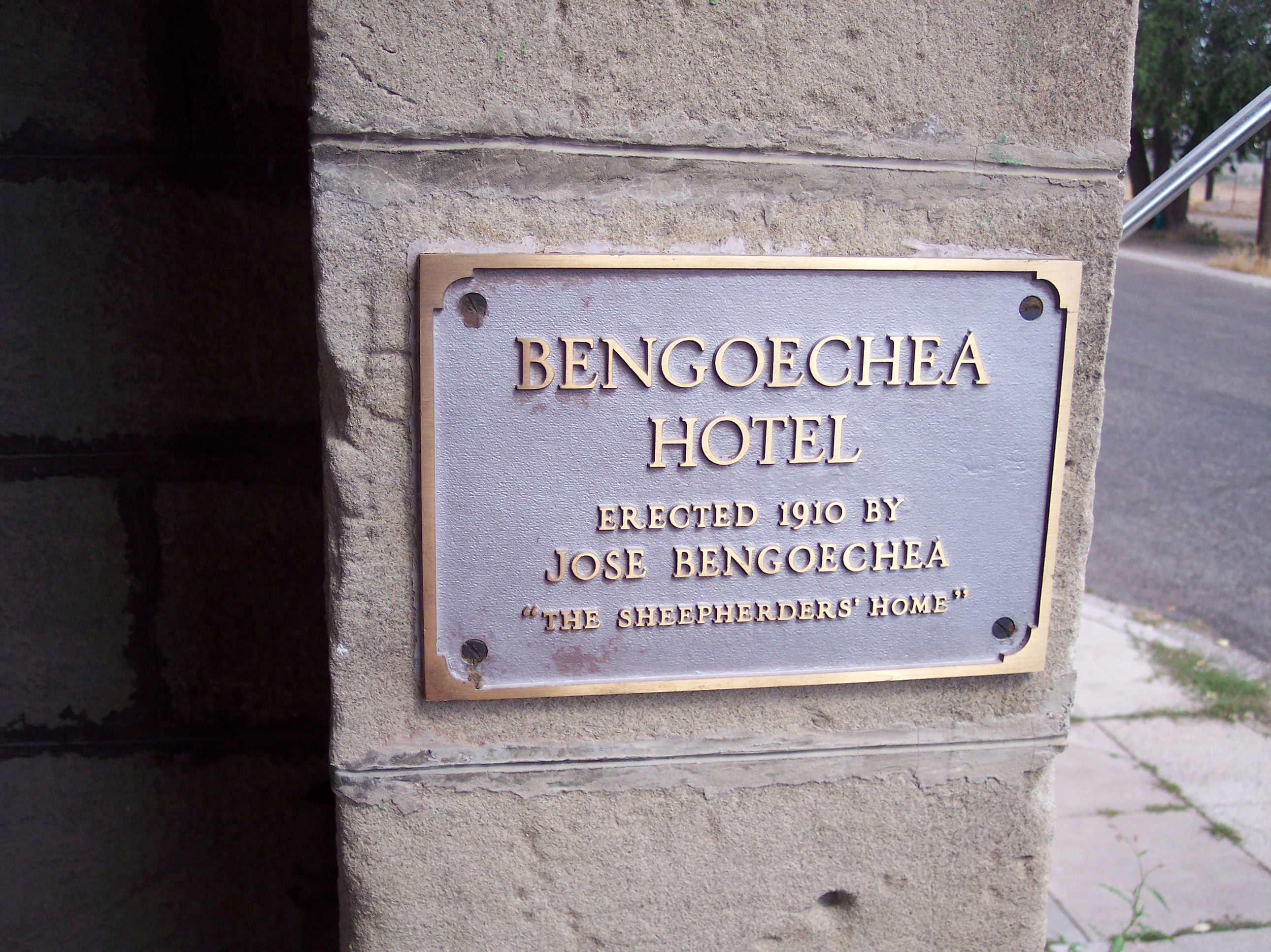
"The Sheepherders' Home"
