= List of Basque restaurants =

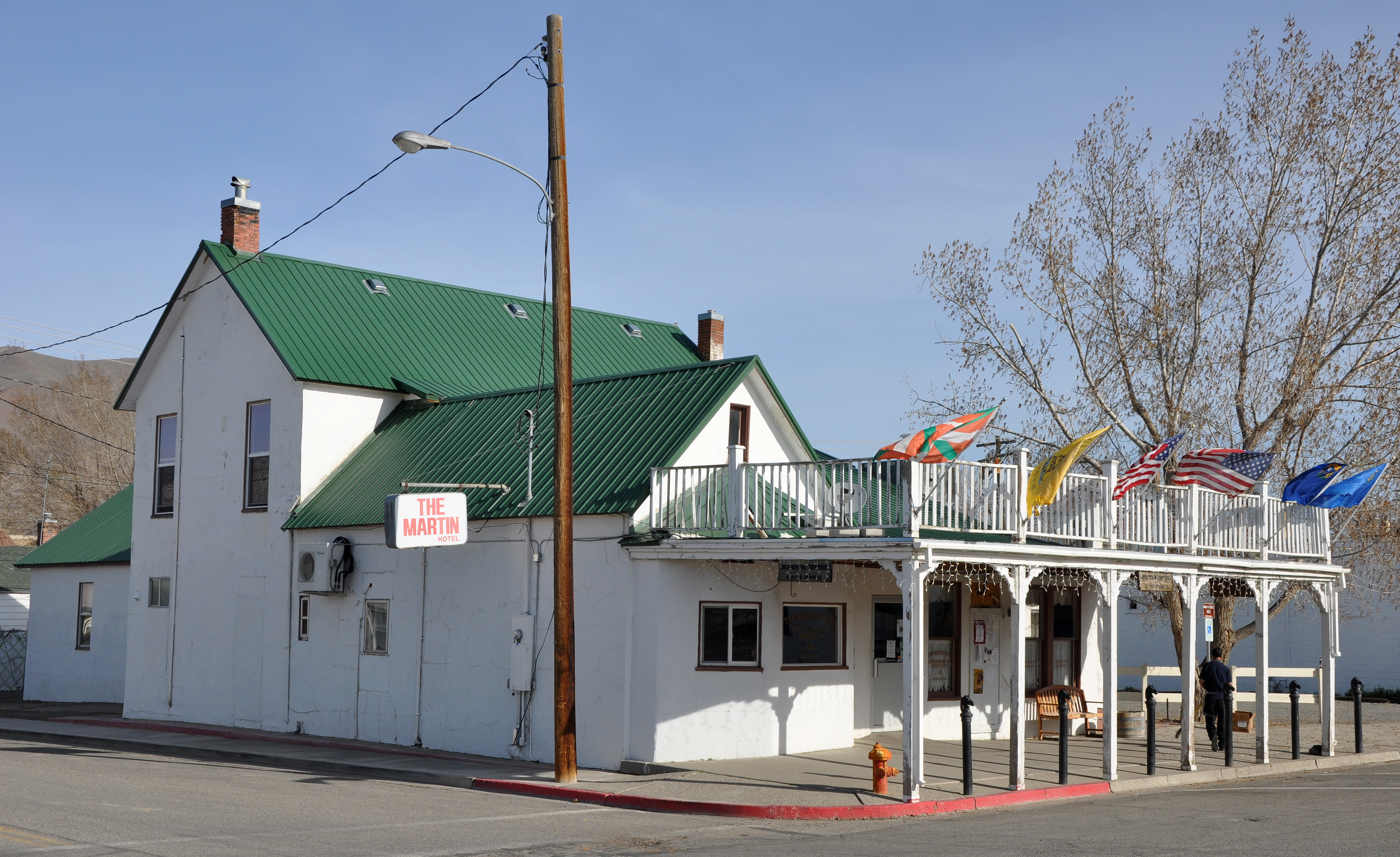
Exterior of Martin Hotel in Winnemucca, Nevada

Below is a list of notable Basque restaurants, with cooking inspired by the food of Basque Country:

== Mexico ==
=== Closed ===
- Biko, Mexico City, Mexico (2008–2018)

== Spain ==
- Akelarre, San Sebastián (1974–present)
- Arzak, San Sebastián (1897–present)

== United States ==
- Martin Hotel, Winnemucca, Nevada (1913–present)

=== Closed ===
- Aatxe, San Francisco, California, U.S. (2015–2017)
- Noriega Hotel, Bakersfield, California, U.S. (1893–2020)
- Winnemucca Hotel, Winnemucca, Nevada (1863–2019)

== See also ==
- Basque cuisine
