= Basque Americans in Nevada =

Ethnic group in the United States

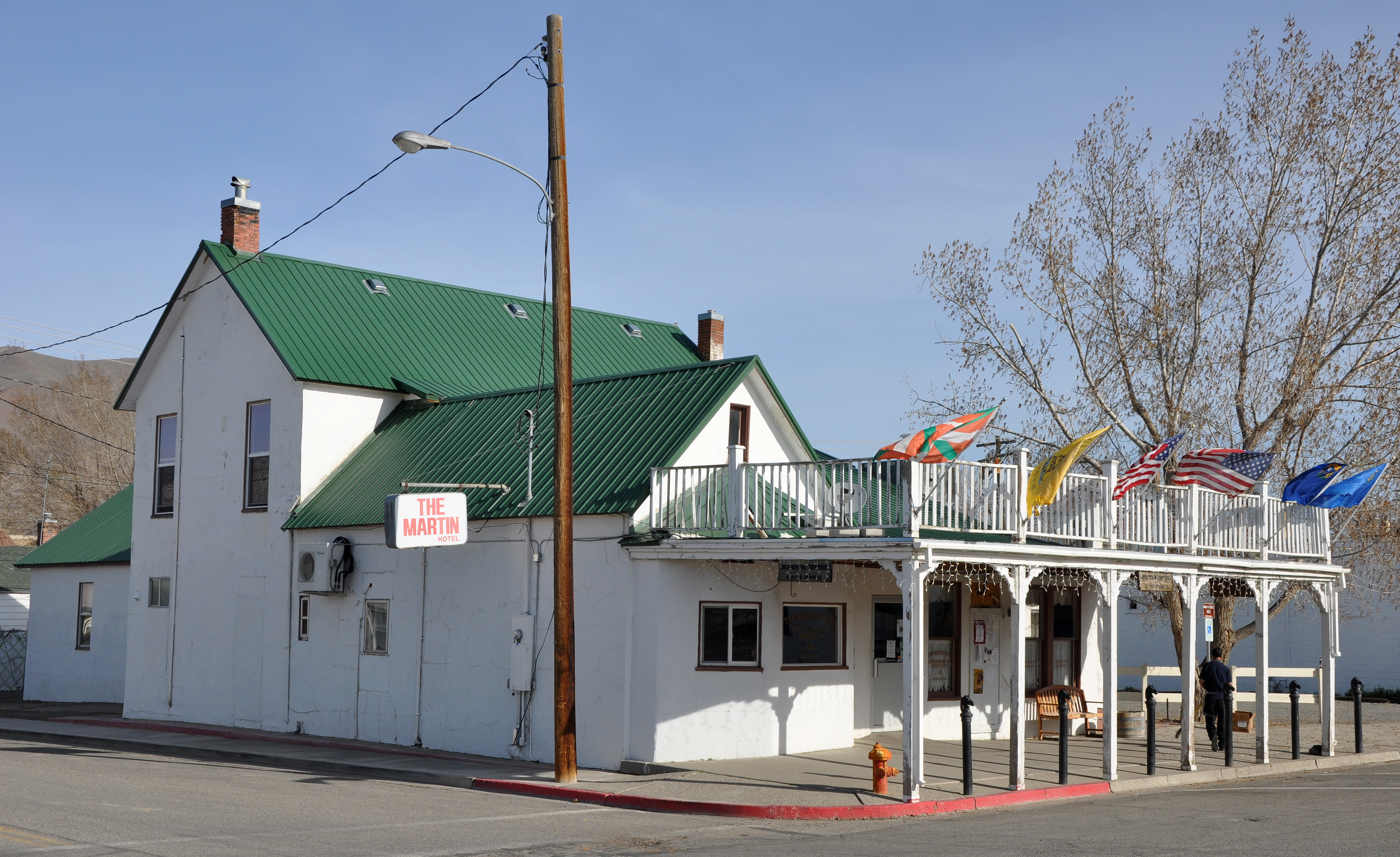
Martin Hotel, a hotel that served as a boardinghouse for Basque sheepherders.

Basques have been living in Northern Nevada for over a century and form a population of several thousand. Basque immigrants first came in the mid-1800s during the Gold rush. The Basques have also been closely-tied to sheep herding in Nevada and neighboring states.

The Basque-American culture is especially prominent in the town of Winnemucca. Basque immigrants to Winnemucca founded the Martin Hotel and the Winnemucca Hotel, both of which were associated with the Basque sheepherders.

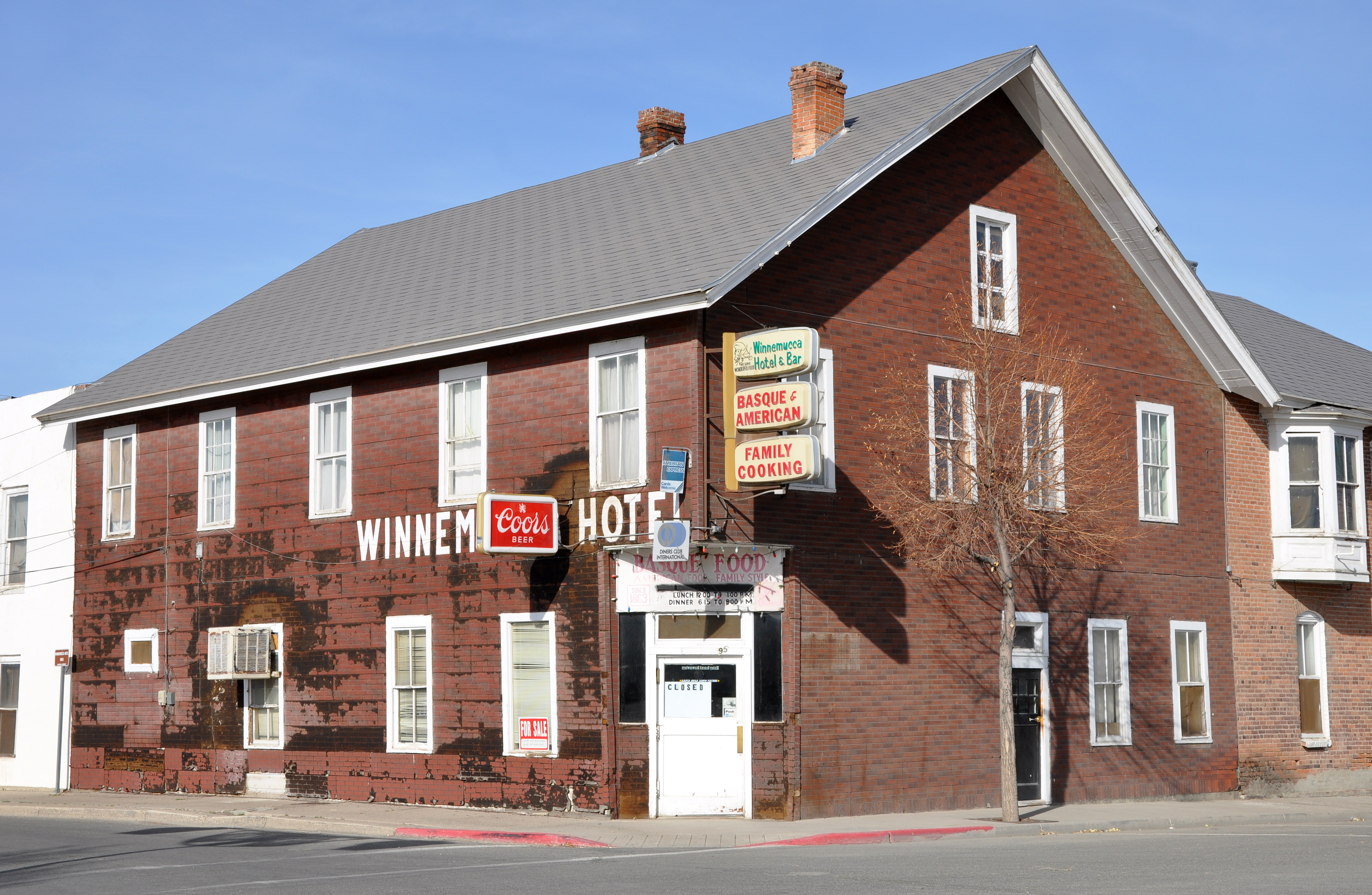
Winnemucca Hotel, a hotel that served as a boardinghouse for Basque sheepherders.
