= Noriega Hotel =

Defunct restaurant in California, United States of America

Restaurant information
- Established: 1893; 133 years ago
- Closed: 2020; 6 years ago
- Owner: Elizalde family
- Food type: Basque cuisine with American influences
- Dress code: Casual
- Location: 525 Sumner Street, Bakersfield, California, 93305, United States
- Seating capacity: 120
- Reservations: yes

Noriega Hotel, known as Iberia Hotel until 1906, and commonly known as Noreiga's, was a Basque and American restaurant, boarding house and Basque cultural center located in East Bakersfield, California. The business opened in 1893 and was a staple of the Basque American culture in Bakersfield and California at large for generations, but closed in 2020 due to the COVID-19 pandemic.

== History ==
Faustino Noriega immigrated to the United States from Santander, Spain in 1872 as a shepherd. In 1893, he partnered with Fernando Etchevarry, a Basque immigrant, to open the Iberia Hotel. In 1906, the name changed from Iberia Hotel to Noriega Hotel.

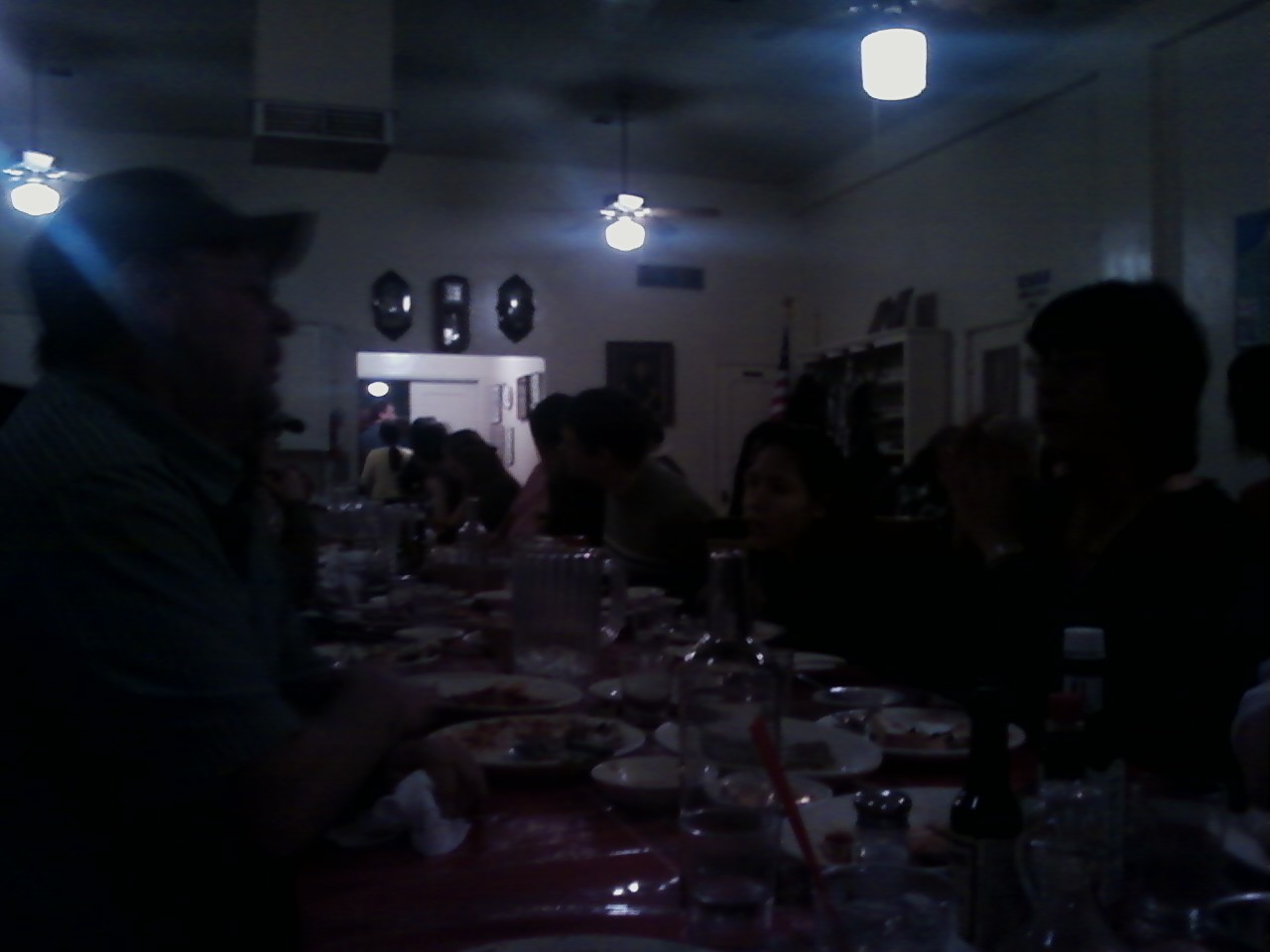
Family style dining at Noriega Hotel

The building served as a boardinghouse, post office, employment center, restaurant, and community center for Basques who often only spoke the Basque language. Noriega's is located two blocks from the former Southern Pacific Station, where many immigrants had arrived from Ellis Island only with a lapel that said "Noriega Hotel Bakersfield, California".

In 1931, Jean and Grace Elizalde bought the property. In 1940, the current restaurant and a portion of the building were added.

In March 2020, due to the COVID-19 pandemic, the restaurant temporarily closed due to the difficulty of social distancing with family style dining. In April 2020, the restaurant announced they would not reopen and the restaurant was sold in June 2020. At the time of the sale, the restaurants was co-owned by the two granddaughters of the Elizaldes, Linda Elizalde-McCoy and Rochelle Ladd. Mrs. Ladd, a regular hostess, died in January 2023 at the age of 70 of a longstanding heart condition.

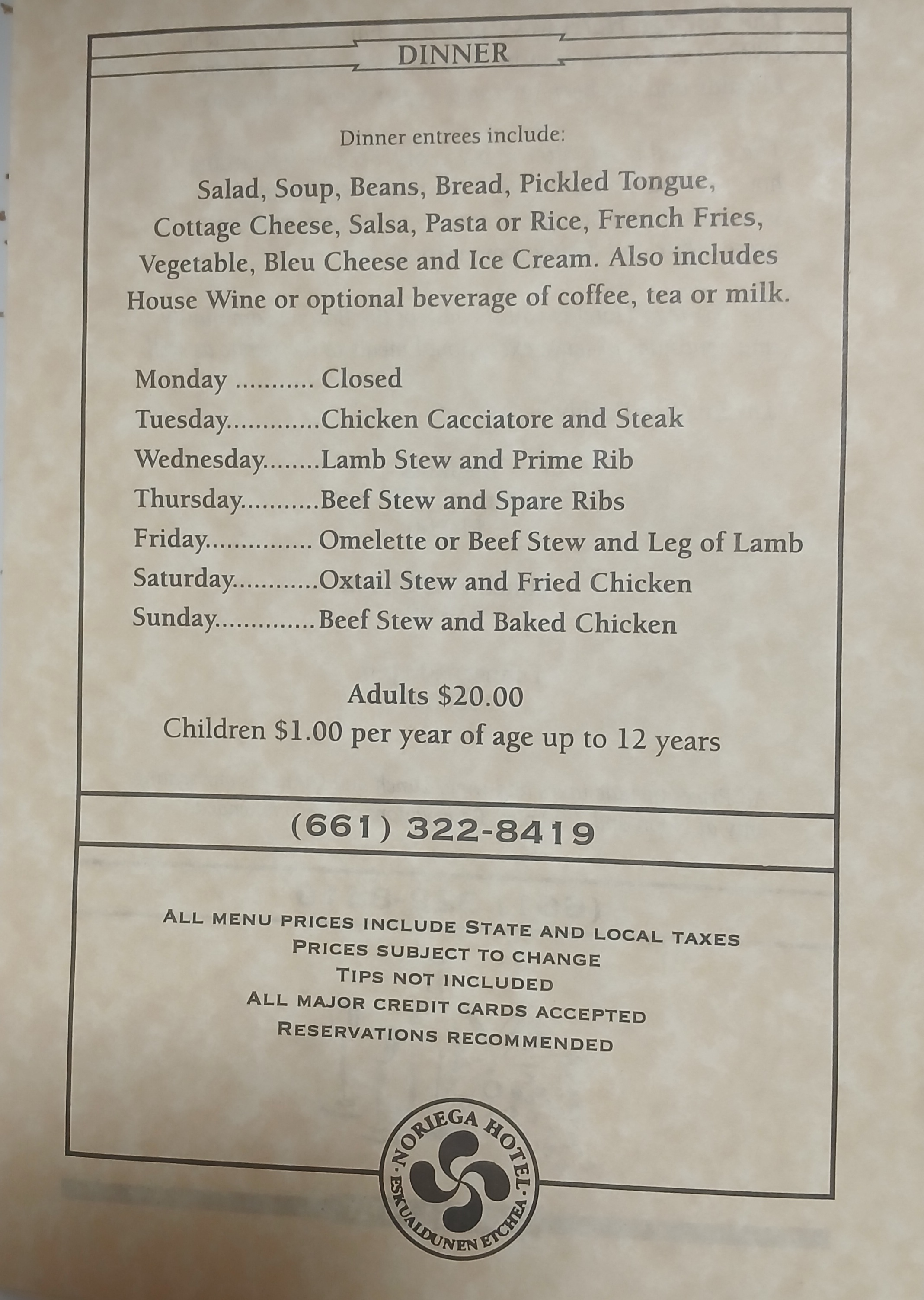
A 2011 dinner menu for Noriega Hotel in Bakersfield, California

=== Post-closure ===
After the sale, a new Noriega's opened at 4809 Stockdale Highway in June 2021 and continued with the same recipes, as well as tables, chairs, plates and other memorabilia. However, it too closed in early 2025.

The original building at 525 Sumner Street remains vacant as of 2026. The original bar and neon sign were moved from the original location were moved to the Kern County Museum.

== Cuisine ==
The restaurant served a mixture of traditional Basque cuisine and more modern American cuisine. The front of the restaurant contained a bar, open until about 10pm. Meals were served family style in the dining room in the back at set times, 7am for breakfast, noon for lunch and 7pm for dinner. All three meals were served with wine. Lunch and dinner was served with soup, salad, beans, bread, salsa and bleu cheese. In addition, at dinner the meal was served with beef tongue and French fries.

== Awards and accolades ==
In 2011, the restaurant received the James Beard Award for America's Classics. This award is given to "given to restaurants with timeless appeal, beloved for quality food that reflects the character of their community"

Noriega's was featured in Huell Hower's television show, California's Gold, the Los Angeles Times, and Smithsonian Magazine.

== See also ==
- Basque cuisine
- List of Basque restaurants
